= List of Yamaha motorcycles =

The following is a list of motorcycles, scooters and mopeds produced by the Yamaha Motor Company.

== First and last bike ==
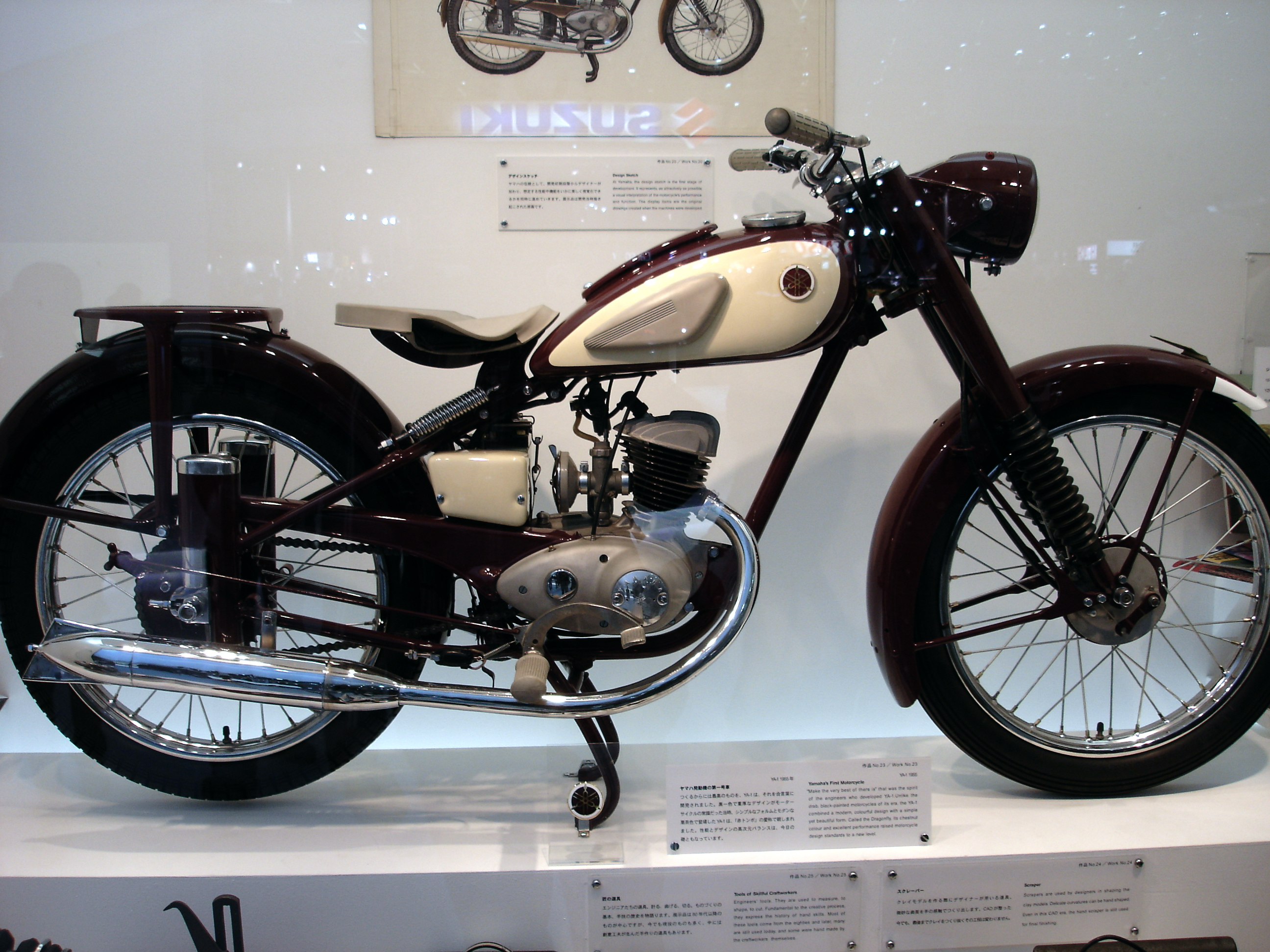
Yamaha YA-1

- YA-1 built August 1954, produced January 1955. The first bike manufactured by Yamaha was actually a copy of the German DKW RT 125; it had an air-cooled, two-stroke, single cylinder 125 cc engine
- YC-1 (1956) was the second bike manufactured by Yamaha; it was a 175 cc single cylinder two-stroke.
- YD-1 (1957) Yamaha began production of its first 250 cc, two-stroke twin, the YD1.
- MF-1 (1958) 50 cc, two-stroke, single cylinder, step through street bike
- YDS-3 (1964) 246 cc, two-stroke, parallel-twin, it used the world's first oil injection lubrication system in a 2-stroke engine.
- DT-1 (1968) Yamaha's first true off-road motorcycle.
- XS-1 (1970) Yamaha's first four-stroke engine motorcycle (650 cc twin).
- YZ Monocross (1975) First production motocross bike with a single rear shock.
- YZ400F (1998) First mass-produced four-stroke motocross motorcycle.

== Road bikes ==
=== Two-stroke ===
- AG100
- AG175
- Chappy50
- Chappy80
- CR5
- CS3
- CS5
- CT1 / CT2 / CT3
- AT-1 / AT-1MX / AT-3
- DT-1 / DT-2 / DT-3
- DS5E
- DS6-C
- DS6 2
- DS7 2
- DTE125
- DTE175
- DTF125
- DT RT4
- Force1
- FS1E
- F5C
- GL750 Prototype
- GT50
- GT80
- GT100
- GTI80
- H3-90
- HT-1B-90
- IT125
- IT175
- IT200
- IT250
- IT400
- IT425
- IT465
- IT490
- JA75
- L5T
- L5TA
- LS2 100
- LS3 100
- L2GF 100
- L2G 100
- LT 100
- LT 100 MX
- LT2 100
- LT3 100
- MG1T
- MR50
- MX50
- MX80
- MX100
- MX125
- MX175
- MX250
- MX360
- MX400
- MX500
- QA50 Pocke
- QB50 Vogel
- QT50
- RA31 125
- R3C
- R5
- RD50
- RD60
- RD125
- RD135
- RD200
- RD250
- RD350
- RD400
- RD80LC
- RD125LC
- RD250LC
- RD350LC
- RD500LC
- RD350 YPVS
- RZ350
- RDX125
- R1-Z
- RS-100
- RS125
- RS125DX
- RS200
- RX50
- RX-Z
- RX DX
- RX 100
- RX-S (and RX-Special)
- RX-125
- RX-King
- RX Concorde
- RT-1 / RT-2 / RT-3
- RT-80
- RT-100
- RT150
- RT180
- RT360
- SDR 200
- TD2
- TDR50
- TDR80
- Trailmaster-80
- Trailmaster-100
- TT125
- TY50 Trial
- TY80 Trial
- TY80A Trial
- TY80B Trial
- TY125 Trial
- TY175 Trial
- TY200 Trial
- TY250 Trial
- TY250R Trial
- TY250S Trial
- TY250Z Trial
- TY350 Trial
- TY350R Trial
- TY350S Trial
- TZM 150
- V50
- V50P
- V50M
- V70
- V75
- V80
- V80M
- V90
- VR150
- Y100
- Y100 Sport
- YCS-1
- YCS-1-Bonanza
- YA-1
- YA-6
- YA-6 Santa Barbara
- YA-7
- YB50
- YB100
- YC-1
- YD / YD-1 / YD-2 / YD-3
- YDS-1 / YDS-3 / YDS-3C Big Bear / YDS6C
- YE1 / YE2
- YES1
- YG1 / YG1K / YG2 / YG3 / YG5 / YG-T
- YJ-1
- L2
- YAS1 / YAS2 / YAS3
- YL1 / YL2 / YL2C
- YM1 / YM1S / YM2C
- YR1 / YR2 / YR3
- YSR50
- TZR50
- TZR80
- TZR125
- TZR250

=== Four-stroke ===
- AG125
- AG200
- BT1100 Bulldog
- Factor 125i
- Factor 150
- Fascino
- Fazer25
- FJ600
- FJ750
- FJ1100
- FJ1200
- FJR1300
- FZS 600
- FZ1
- FZ8
- FZ6
- FZ16 / Byson / FZ-S / Fazer
- FZ150i / V-Ixion
- FZ250
- FZ400
- FZ600
- FZ750
- FZR150
- FZR250
- FZR250R
- FZR400
- FZR600R
- FZR750R / 0W01
- FZR1000
- FZX700 / 750 Fazer
- Golden Eagle 300
- GTS1000
- GX250/400 (JDM name for XS250/400)
- GX750 (JDM name for XS750)
- Morpho I
- MT-01
- MT-125
- MT-15 / Xabre
- MT-25
- MT-03
- MT-07
- MT-09
- MT-10
- Tracer 700
- Tracer 900 / MT-09 Tracer / FJ-09
- Ray Z
- Ray ZR
- Saluto
- Scorpio Z
- SRV250
- SR1
- SR125
- SR150
- SR185
- SR250
- SR400
- SR500
- SR600
- SRX250
- SRX400
- SRX600
- Star Eluder
- Star Venture
- Crux
- Libero G5
- YBA-125 Enticer
- Gladiator
- SS 125
- YBR 125
- YBR150
- YBR250
- RS110F
- STX
- SZ
- SZ-RR
- SZR150
- SZR660
- T-150
- TDM 850
- TDM900
- TRX850
- TFX-150
- TX500
- TX600
- TX650
- TX750
- Venture
- XVZ1200 Venture Royale
- XVZ1300 Venture Royale
- V-Star 250
- V-Star 650 Custom
- V-Star 650 Classic
- V-Star 1100 Classic
- V-Star-1100-Silverado
- V-Star 950 Tourer
- V-Star 1300 Tourer
- Virago XV125
- Virago XV250
- Virago XV400
- Virago XV500
- Virago XV535
- Virago XV700
- Virago XV750
- Virago XV920
- Virago XV1000
- Virago XV1100
- XV1900A
- XJ400 / XJ550 / *XJ 600 / XJ650 / *Yamaha XJ650 Maxim / *XJ650RJ Seca / XJ700 / XJ700X / XJ750 / XJ900 / XJ1100 Maxim
- XJ750 Maxim
- XJ750X Maxim-X
- XJ6
- XJ 600N
- XJ 600S Diversion / Seca II
- XJ900F
- XJ 900S Diversion
- XJ1100 Maxim
- XJR1300 SP
- XS250 / XS360 / XS400 / XS400R Seca 400 / XS500 / XS650 /XS650 Turbo/ XS750 / XS850 / XS Eleven
- XS750E
- XS750S Custom
- XS1100
- XS 1100 Martini
- XS 1100 SF Midnight Special
- XS1100 Turbo
- XT200 / XT225 / XT250 / XT350 / XT400E / XT500 / XT550 / XT600 / XT600E
- XT 660
- XT 125 R / 125 x
- XTZ 250
- XTZ 660
- XTZ 700
- XTZ 750
- XV920R
- XV950 Racer
- XVS Drag Star 125
- XVS 650 Drag Star
- XVS 1100 Drag Star
- XVS 950 Midnight Star
- XVS 1300 Midnight Star
- XV 1000 SE Midnight Special
- XV 1900 Midnight Star
- XV19 Star Eluder (base and GT)
- XV19 Star Venture (base and Transcontinental)
- XVS 1300 Custom
- XVS 1300 Tour Classic
- XVS 1300 Touring
- XVS 1300 VT
- XV1600A Wildstar
- XV1600 Road Star
- XV1700 Warrior
- XVZ1300 Royal Star
- XZ 400
- XZ 400 D
- XZ 550 RK
- XZ 550 Vision
- YD 100
- Junoon
- YCZ110
- YD125
- YS125
- YS150
- YS250
- YS300
- YX600 Radian
- Bolt
- VMax
- XJR400
- XJR1200
- XJR1300
- XSR125
- XSR155
- XSR700
- XSR900
- YZF600R
- YZF750R
- YZF1000R
- YZF-R125
- YZF-R15
- YZF-R25
- YZF-R3
- YZF-R6
- YZF-R7
- YZF-R7
- YZF-R9
- YZF-R1
- Zeal 250
- Zeal 400
- ZR150

== Step-throughs, scooters, underbones ==
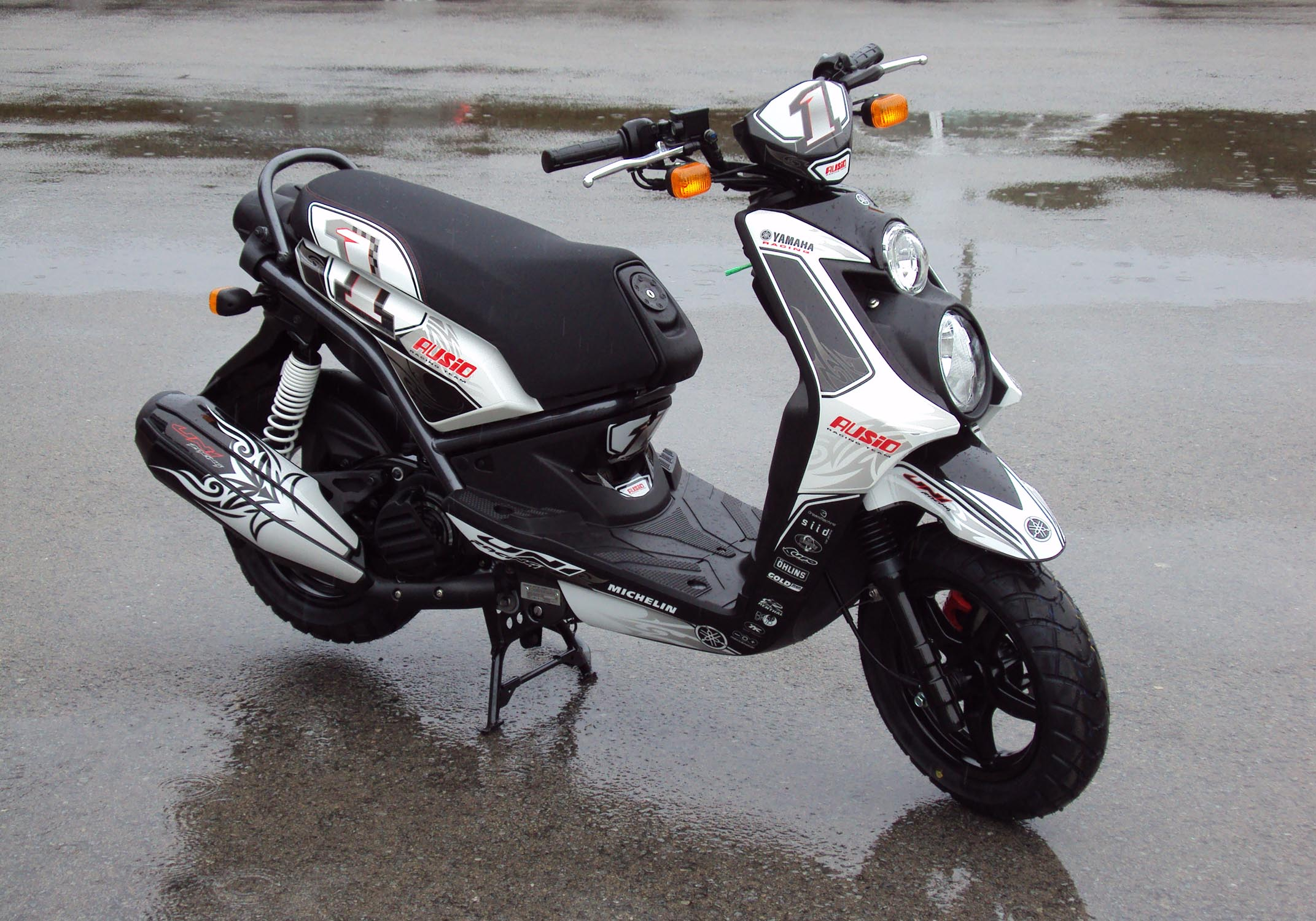
Yamaha BW125

Some of these step-throughs and scooters are made for Southeast Asian markets, where they are known as underbones.

- Lagenda series
- LC50
- MJ50
- V50M
- C3
- Lexam
- Nouvo
- Mio
- Sirius
- X-1
- X-1R
- Chappy
- Acruzo
- Active
- Aerox
- Belle 80
- Belle 100
- Belle R
- Beluga
- BJ 50
- Box'n 50
- BW's NBA 50
- BW 50
- BW 125
- Champ
- Champ CX
- Champ RS
- Cute
- Cuxi
- EZ115
- F1ZR/ss two
- Fazzio
- Fiore / Jog Ciao
- Finn / Jupiter Finn / Crypton S
- Giggle
- Grand Filano / Nozza Grande
- Janus
- Jog
- JR120
- Latte / D'elight
- Limi
- Mint
- Neo's
- Nozza / Filano
- Passol
- PG-1
- QBIX
- Salient / Riva
- Slider Naked
- Speed MX
- Tiara
- Tiara S
- Try
- Why
- Vino 125
- Vino Classic 50
- Ray ZR 125
- Rex
- RS Neo 125
- Vox
- Vino
- Molte Vino
- Vinoora
- U7E
- Y125Z
- T-150
- Jupiter MX / 135LC / Spark 135 / Sniper
- Zest
- Zuma 50
- Zuma 125
- ZR120

=== Maxi-scooters ===
Large scooters with more than 125 cc, and a large chassis and protection from the elements.

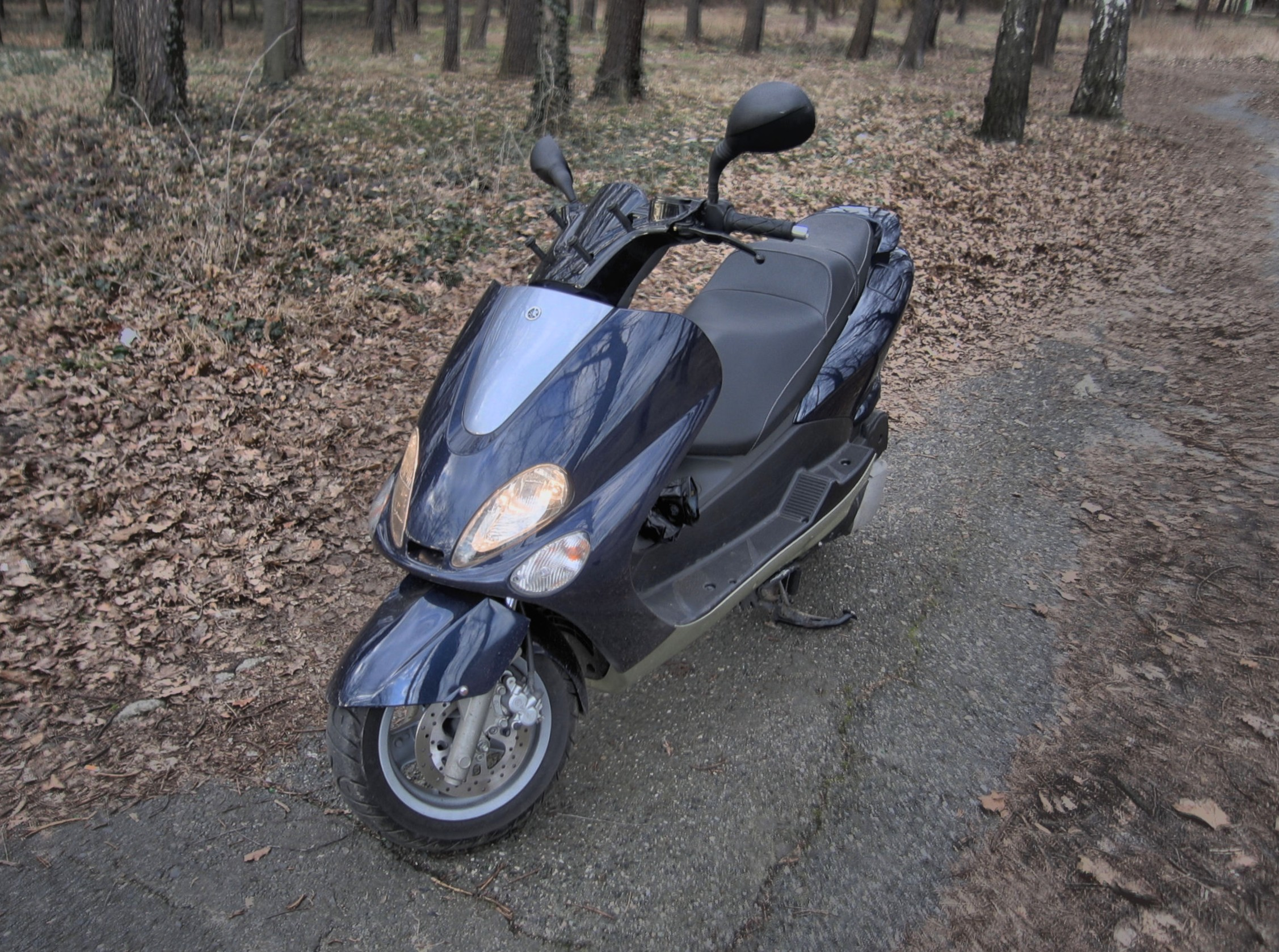
Yamaha Majesty 125

- Axis Grand 100
- Axis Z 125
- Aerox / NVX 125 / 155
- Augur 155
- Cygnus / Riva 180
- CygnusX 125
- CygnusX SR 125
- Cygnus Gryphus 125
- Fluo / FreeGo 125
- Force / X-Force 155
- Gear 125
- Iron Max 125
- Iron Max 250
- Iron Max 300
- Iron Max 400
- Iron Max 530
- LEXi
- LEXi LX 155 (Indonesia)
- Vity 125
- X-City 125
- X-City 250
- Maxam 250
- Morphous 250
- Majesty 125
- Majesty 250
- YP400 Majesty
- MW-Vision
- MWC-4
- Neo / Soul / Ego Avantiz / GT 125
- NMAX 125
- NMAX 155
- SMAX 155
- Xenter 125
- XMAX 125
- XMAX 250
- XMAX 300
- XMAX 400
- Grand Majesty 400
- TMAX
- TTX / X-Ride
- 150 MX King
- 3CT

== Motorcycle racing ==
=== Two-Stroke ===
- YD1
- RD48
- AS1
- YR1
- YR2
- YR3
- TA125
- TD1 / TD2 / TD3
- TR2 / TR3
- TZ50
- TZ125
- TZ250
- TZ350
- TZ500
- TZ700
- TZ750
- 0W48R
- RD56
- YZR250
- YZR500

=== Four-Stroke ===
- YZR-M1
- 0W01
- YZE750T
- YZE850T

== Off-road bikes ==
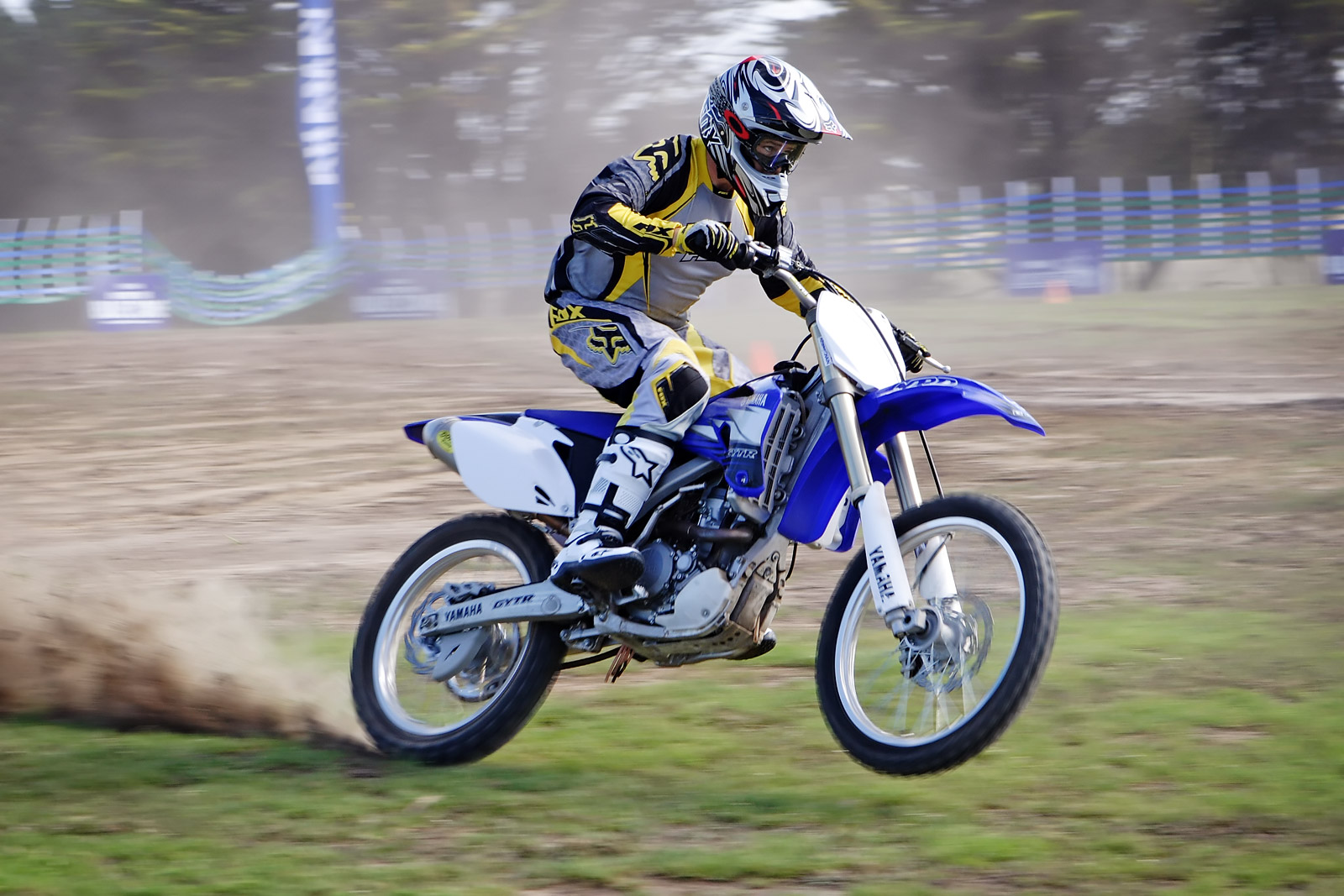
A 2007 Yamaha YZ250F motocross ridden at Phillip Island

=== Trail bike ===
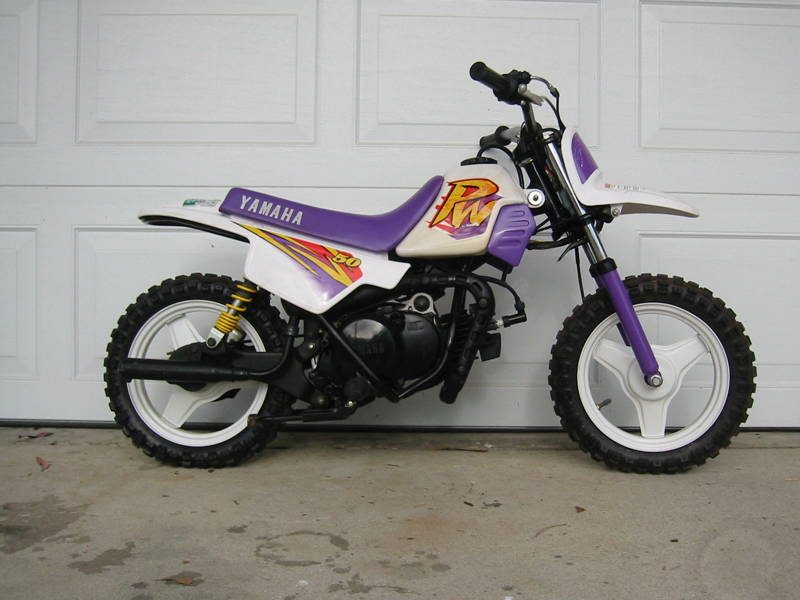
Yamaha PW50

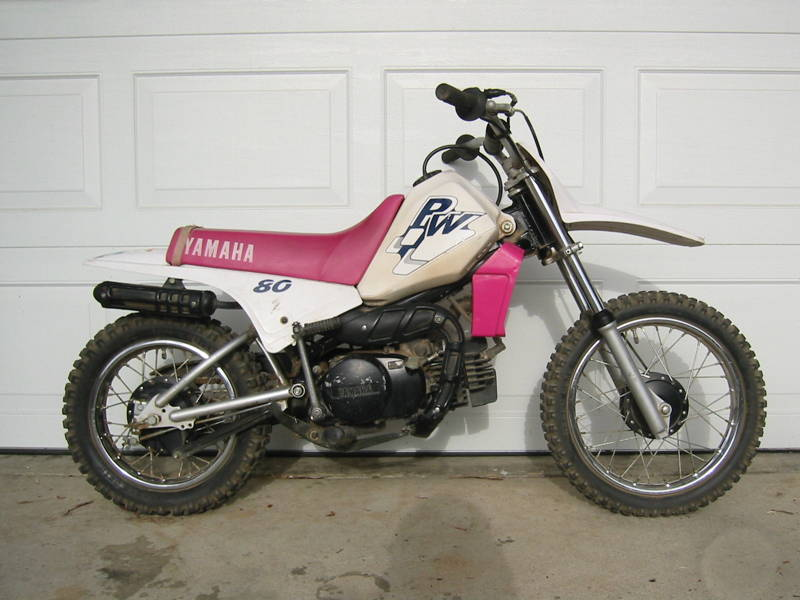
Yamaha PW80

==== Two-stroke ====
- CT175
- DT50
- DT80
- DT100
- DT125
- DT175
- DT200
- DT230
- DT250
- DT360
- DT400
- L5
- TDR125
- TDR250
- YL1 / YL2 / YL2C
- AG175
- AT1 / AT2 / AT3
- BW80
- BW200
- BW350
- CT1 / CT2 / CT3
- DT1 / DT2 / DT3
- JT1 / JT2
- LT2
- PW50
- PW80
- RT1 / RT2 / RT3

==== Four-stroke ====
- FZT750
- FZT900
- TW125
- TW200
- TW225
- WR125R
- WR125X
- WR250R
- WR250X
- WR250F
- WR450F
- XT125X
- XT125R
- XT200
- XT225
- XT250
- XT350
- XT400
- XT500
- XT550
- XT600
- XT660R
- XT660X
- XT660Z Ténéré
- XTZ660 Ténéré
- XTZ750 Super Ténéré
- XT1200Z Super Ténéré
- YZE750
- YZE850
- Ténéré 700
- TT125R
- TT250
- TT350
- TT500
- TT600
- TT600R
- TTR50
- TTR90
- TTR110
- TTR125
- TTR225
- TTR230
- TTR250

=== Enduro ===
==== Two-stroke ====
- IT125
- IT175
- IT200
- IT250
- IT250H
- IT400
- IT425
- IT465
- IT490
- WR200
- WR250
- WR500
- YZ125X
- YZ250X

==== Four-stroke ====
- WR125R
- WR125X
- WR250R
- WR250F
- WR400F
- WR426F
- WR450F
- YZ250FX
- YZ450FX

=== Trials ===
- TY50
- TY80
- TY125
- TY175
- TY200
- TY250
- TY350

=== Motocross ===
==== Two-stroke ====
- GT80
- LT100MX
- MX100
- MX125
- MX175
- MX250
- MX360
- MX400
- YZ50
- YZ60
- YZ65
- YZ80
- YZ85
- YZ100
- YZ125
- YZ175
- YZ250
- YZ360
- YZ400
- YZ465
- YZ490
- YZM500
- RT100
- RT180
- SC500
- WR250
- WR500

==== Four-stroke ====
- HL500
- SC500MX
- YZ250F
- YZ400F
- YZ426F
- YZ450F

== Tilting three-wheeled motor scooter ==
- Tricity 125
- Tricity 155
- Tricity 300
- Niken

== Electric motorcycles and scooters ==
- E-01
- EMF
- Frog
- Mest
- Eccy
- EC-02
- EC-05
- EC-06
- Aerox-e
- NEO's
- Passol
- Passol-L
- Pocke
- Seated Electric Scooter

== Concept/prototype motorcycles ==
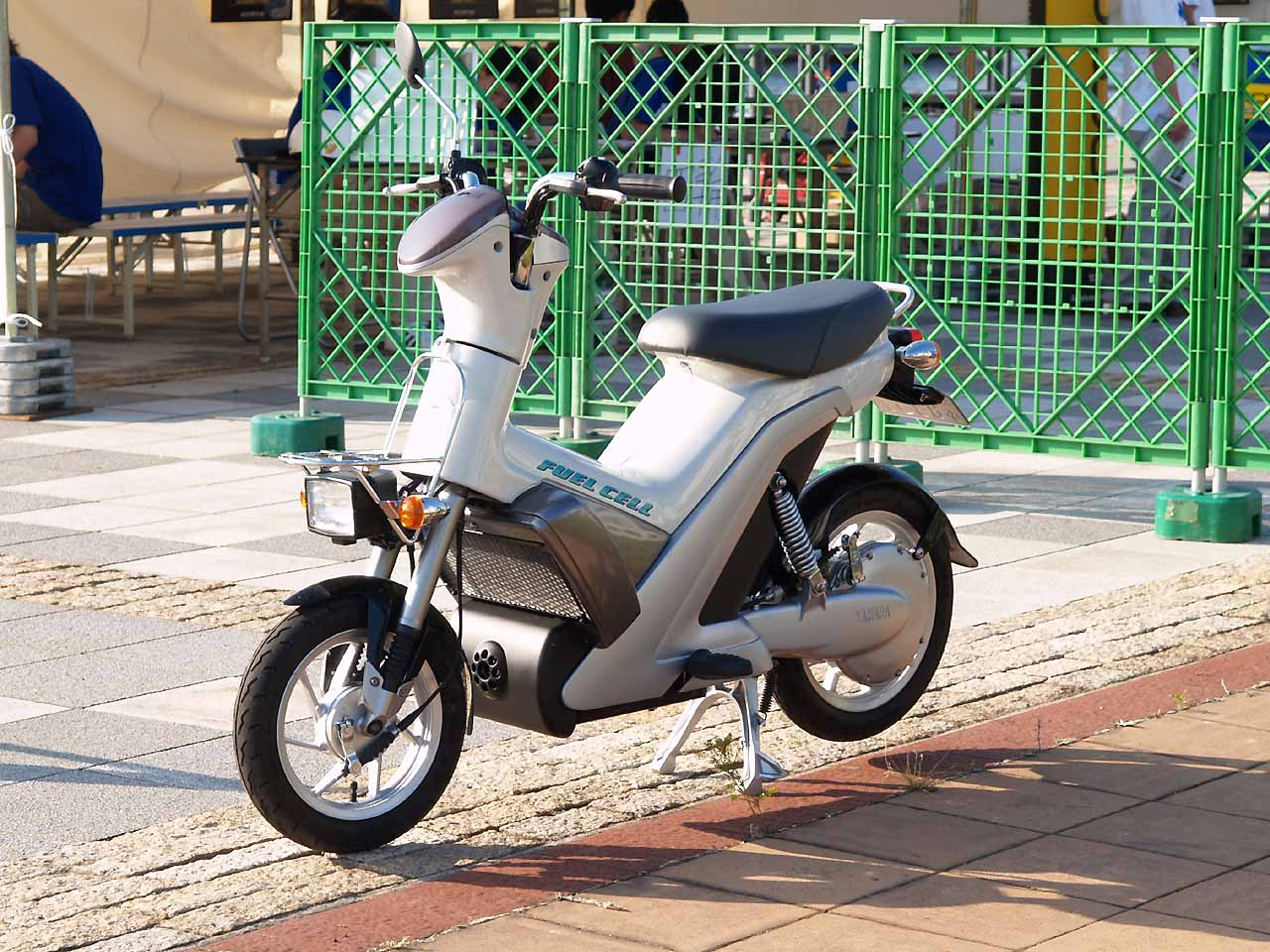
A Yamaha FC-me

- Concept 3CT
- DEINONYCHUS
- EKIDS
- E02
- EVINO
- FC-me
- Gen-Ryu
- GL750
- Hybride HV-X
- HV-01
- Luxair
- MAXAM 3000
- Morpho
- Morpho II
- MT-05
- MWT-9
- OR2T
- OV-23XV
- PED1
- PES1
- VOX
- XS-V1 Sakura
- XT250X
- XV 950 BOLT (Café Racer)
- Tesseract
- YE01
- RZ201 Rotary
- Ténéré 700 World Raid
- 01GEN
- 525 XTY – Prototype trial
- 1200 Venture
