= Yamaha XZ 550 =

Yamaha Vision XZ 550
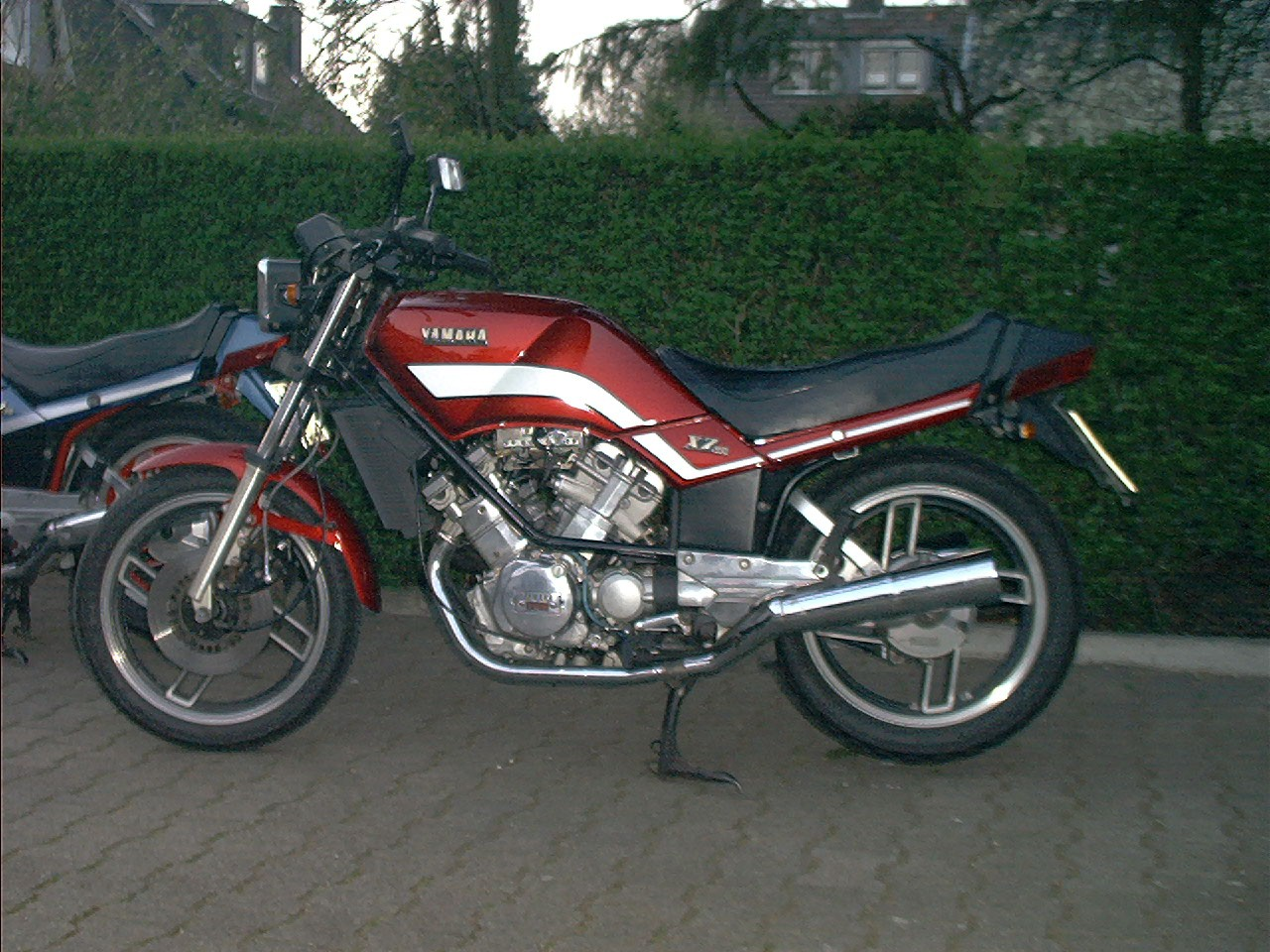
- Manufacturer: Yamaha motorcycles
- Production: 1982-1983
- Class: Sport touring
- Engine: 552 cc & 400 cc, 4-stroke, V-Twin, liquid-cooled, DOHC
- Transmission: 5-speed, shaft drive.
- Weight: 212 kg (467 lb) (wet)

The Yamaha XZ550 'Vision' is a 550 cc V-twin, shaft-driven sport touring motorcycle produced by Yamaha in 1982–1983. It was powered by a 4 stroke 70° liquid cooled 4 valve DOHC engine, and featured a trailing front axle and monoshock single swingarm rear. With a range of innovative technology for its class, nimble handling, and bold styling, it was widely celebrated by the motorcycle press on its introduction as a bike ahead of its time.

Persistent issues with sprocket teeth, high price, and an issue of not being a traditional café racer or a sport touring bike led to a production run of only two years. While a sales failure, the Vision had fans because of the blend of the two styles of bike, and has an active online community.

A smaller XZ400 model was available in some markets until at least 1987.

== Overview ==
The XZ550 Vision was originally conceived in the late 1970s when motorcycling was at its peak, and spent three years in development, being overseen by a small group of designers and enthusiasts rather than "committee think". Several high-profile external contributors were involved, including GK Design Associates, and reputedly Cosworth for the engine and Porsche for the final drive. According to GK, the goal was to make “the most advanced super sport bike in terms of both styling and riding performance"

To many enthusiasts, the XZ550 that debuted in 1982 succeeded on both fronts. It was nimble in tight corners, yet had a comfortable upright seating position that made long rides a joy. Its throaty high-torque engine delivered both high revs for street racing and endless roll-on torque. The 70-degree V-twin had inherent secondary balance and produced a distinctive deep, throbbing exhaust note with a high-end whine some likened to the sound of a Ferrari Testarossa.

In spite of this first year sales were poor. The Vision was considered "the closest bike to a B.M.W. ever to come out of Japan" at the time, in reference to its touring credentials and reliability on long-distance runs, both hailed and damned as "the most European motorcycle from Japan in recent memory."

Unfortunately, producing an entirely new product from scratch is never without initial problems, and the Vision suffered from a few. An off-idle carburetion flaw left first year machines prone to initial stuttering most noticeable on full-throttle takeoff.

The 1982 model's lightning quick steering was highly appreciated by sporting riders, but considered too extreme for some. A single rotor front disk and rear drum brake were suitable for touring but inadequate for high-performance cornering. The shaft drive was smooth and reliable but again better suited to touring. The front suspension was too soft, and the rear, even with an adjustable shock, difficult to dial in.

The water-cooled 4-stroke XZ550 was the first Yamaha model to feature automotive-style downdraft carburetors, with the air cleaner box mounted atop the carburetors to take advantage of a direct path for the fuel-air mixture into the cylinders - a more efficient delivery than the sidedraft carburetors common at the time. However, the height of the carburetors and their airbox required Yamaha to design a bulky tunnel into the underside of the generous 17 liter (4.5 gallon) gas tank. The result was improved performance, and the bike's distinctive large squared-off fuel tank.

A small “bikini” fairing and a full sport-touring fairing were both optional in 1982. The touring style full fairing became standard when the bike was repositioned as a sport tourer in 1983.

The US 1983 model Vision fixed most of the '82's faults, with an improved carburetor eliminating the stumble, and air adjustable front forks firming up the ride and improving the roadholding. The full fairing, with adjustable hot and cold air vents, effectively shielded the rider. Minor carburetor improvements brought the engine's unique combination of responsive high-revving clear up to its 10,000 R.P.M. redline and massive torque at any RPMs to the fore. The oversquare bore and short stroke kept piston speed low.

With its unique frame, which hung rather than cradled the engine and eliminated any tubing beneath it, both saving weight and lowering the bike's center of gravity, the Vision's performance and roadholding were far ahead of its time.

Unfortunately, so too was its price. The motorcycling boom of the Seventies was already receding before the XZ550 hit the showroom floors, and rival motorcycle companies offered cheaper motorcycles without either the Vision's unusual combination of features or numerous quirks. The model was discontinued from sale in the U.S. in 1983, though it maintains cult status online.

== Models ==
At least thirteen major models were produced.

- 11U European model - available in unfaired, or fully varied variants (XZ550S) with many minor regional differences
- 16R Australasian model - available unfaired, with sales promotion full or bikini fairings. Marketed as XZ550R
- 11V German model - a 50PS low power version
- 11H USA/Canada model - 1982
- 11J USA/Canada model - 1982
- 11K USA/Canada model - 1983
- 28V USA/Canada model - 1983
- 28W USA/Canada model - 1983
- 30R Japanese model - unfaired
- 25R Japanese model - fully faired. Marketed as XZ550D
- 14R Japanese model - a 400 cc version unfaired
- ??? Japanese model - a 400 cc version with sport fairing. Marketed as "Air Current"
- 24R Japanese model - a 400 cc version fully faired. Marketed as XZ400D

Major differences between models included single/dual front disc brakes, different suspension details, air box, carburetor (BD34, BD36), paint schemes and branding (the XZ550 is branded as Vision in the US). As well as the full fairing, a smaller sport fairing was available, and offered as a purchase incentive for unfaired variants.

The 400 cc version was sold from 1983 to 1987 and is almost visually identical to the 550, although it has slightly different height, width, length and weight specifications. It was sold in full faired, half faired and naked versions. The XZ400 was sold into non-U.S. markets (including Europe, Japan, Australia and New Zealand). The most obvious differences other than engine capacity were slotted disc brake rotors, and a strap on the seat. Most parts are interchangeable, although the 400 had a different bore and stroke, valve sizes making engine part swaps difficult.

Three different gear ratios exist for the European/Australasian, US and Japanese markets. These are relatively easily swapped between models, allowing riders to select between lower-revving touring style riding, and faster acceleration.

== Engine ==
4-stroke, 70° DOHC 552 cc V-Twin

- aluminum block and steel heads
- 4 valves per cylinder
- liquid-cooled
- dual Mikuni 34–36 mm downdraft carburetors
- 65 PS (48 kW; 64 bhp) at 9500 rpm
- 50 N⋅m (37 lb⋅ft) at 8500 rpm

== Specifications ==
U.S. model specifications from the Yamaha Motor Company, and this model's corresponding Haynes Manual. XZ400 Specifications from the Yamaha Motor Company.

11U model data from the Yamaha Motor Company.

| | 1982-c.1985 | 1982-c.1985 | 1982-c.1985 | 1982 | 1982 | 1983 | 1984–1985 | 1983-c.1987 |
|---|---|---|---|---|---|---|---|---|
| Model Designation: | XZ550, XZ550S | XZ550R | XZ550 | XZ550RJ | XZ550RJ | XZ550RK | XZ550D | XZ400 |
| Market: | Europe, Canada | Australia, New Zealand | Germany | Canada | USA | USA, Canada | Japan | Japan, Australia, New Zealand |
| Model ID: | 11U | 16R | 11V | 11H | 11J | 11K, 28V, 28W | 30R, 25R (D Model) | 14X, 24R (D Model) |
| Colours: | Silver, Red, White/Red(XZ550S) | Silver, Red | Silver, Red | Silver, Red | Silver, Red, black | Black w/gold decals & wheels | Grey | Silver, Red, White/Red, White/Blue |
| Key Identifiers: | Swoosh decal, low risers, rearset pegs, progressive fork springs, "XZ550" side badge, fairing optional (XZ550S), unslotted rotors | Similar to 11U model | Visually same as 11U. 50 PS Model. Frame Serial Number 11U-050101 onwards. Different cam and jetting and minor changes for the carburetors (different number butterfly valves that can not be exchanged) . | High handlebar risers, "vision" side badge, single front disc brake, side reflectors, no fairing | High handlebar risers, "vision" side badge, single front disc brake, side reflectors, no fairing | BD36 Carb, low handlebar risers, rearset pegs, "vision" side badge, side reflectors, fairing/tank decal, gold wheels, fuel gauge, vacuum air flapper, fairing, slotted rotors | Slotted rotors, seat strap, grey color scheme, fairing optional | Slotted rotors, seat strap, XZ400 side badge (silver), silver tank badge, XZ400 color scheme, fairing optional (XZ400D) |
| Engine | 4-stroke, liquid-cooled, 70° V-twin, DOHC, 4 valves per cylinder | | | | | | | |
| Capacity | 552 cc | | | | | | | 398 cc |
| Bore × Stroke: | 80.0 mm × 55.0 mm (3.15 in × 2.17 in) | | | | | | | 73.0 mm × 47.6 mm (2.87 in × 1.87 in) |
| Compression Ratio: | 10.5:1 | | | | | | | |
| Fuel System: | Dual Mikuni BD34, downdraft carburetors | | | | | Dual Mikuni BD36, downdraft carburetors | ? | Dual Mikuni BD34, downdraft carburetors (without fuel pump) |
| Lubrication: | Wet Sump | | | | | | | |
| Ignition: | TCI (Transistor Controlled Ignition) | | | | | | | |
| Clutch: | Wet, multi-plate | | | | | | | |
| Transmission: | 5-speed, constant mesh | | | | | | | |
| Final Drive: | Shaft | | | | | | | |
| Overall Length: | 2,210 mm (87.0 in); 2,255 mm (88.8 in) in Switzerland, Sweden, Denmark, Norway and Finland | | | 2,120 mm (83.5 in) | | | ? | 2,145 mm (84.4 in) |
| Overall Width: | 750 mm (29.5 in) | | | 845 mm (33.3 in) | | | ? | 750 mm (29.5 in) |
| Overall Height: | 1,110 mm (43.7 in) | | | | | | | 1,090 mm (42.9 in) |
| Seat Height: | 775 mm (30.5 in) | | | 780 mm (30.7 in) | | | ? | 775 mm (30.5 in) |
| Wheelbase: | 1,450 mm (57.1 in) | | | 1,445 mm (56.9 in) | | | ? | 1,455 mm (57.3 in) |
| Weight (wet): | 215 kg (474 lbs) | | | 212 kg (467 lbs) | | | ? | 215 kg (474 lbs) |
| Primary Drive Gearing: | 34/72 (2.117:1) | | | 33/73 (2.212:1) | | | | 31/74 (2.387:1) |
| Suspension Front: | Telescopic trailing axle fork, Progressive spring | | | Telescopic trailing axle fork | | Telescopic trailing axle fork, Air damping | | |
| Suspension Rear: | Monoshock, rebound adjustable | | | | | Monoshock, rebound & damping adjustable | | |
| Brakes Front: | Dual hydraulic disc | | | Single hydraulic disc | | Dual hydraulic disc (Slotted) | | |
| Brakes Rear: | Drum (Mechanical linkage) | | | | | | | |
| Tires Front: | 90/90-18 51H | | | | | 100/90-18 56H | ? | 100/90-18 51S |
| Tires Rear: | 4.25/85 H18 | | | 110/90-18 61H | | | ? | 110/90-18 61S |
| Rims: | Tube Type | | | Tubeless Type | | | ? | Tubeless Type |
| Fuel Tank Capacity: | 17 liter (4.5 US gal) | | | | | | | |
