= Yamaha IT175 =

Brand of motorbikes

Yamaha IT175 belongs to the 'International Trial' family of motorcycles, produced during the 1970s and 1980s. The machine is derived from the Yamaha YZ range of competition motocross bikes with modifications for use in competition enduro, hare and hounds and trail riding.

The bike uses an air-cooled, two-stroke, single-cylinder engine with pre-mixed fuel. It is kick start only.

There are three derivations of the machine for the global market. A U.S. and Canada market version, a European version and an Oceanic version for other World markets.

The IT bikes were designed and sold as enduros and can still be plated and registered today, provided you make the necessary modifications to the tail light. Another option is to get a historical plate and use the old brake signal along with your other hand signals for turning.

Other bikes in the IT range include IT125, IT200, IT250, IT425, IT465 and IT490.

The IT range was superseded by the WR (Wide Ratio) in 1991 with the introduction of the WR200, and the WR250 in 1993.

== All Bike Technicals ==
Engine: Two Stroke, Single Cylinder, Reed-valve Inducted

Oil / Fuel Mixture Ration => 20:1

Piston Size => 66.0mm

Bore x Stroke => 66 x 50mm

Cooling System => Air Cooled

Transmission => 6 Speed

Front Tire Size => 3.00 x 21

Rear Tire => 4.10 x 18

Front/Rear Brakes => Drum

Starting => Kick

Ignition => CDI

== 1977 ==
The IT175D was first introduced in 1977 using a bored out 125 cc (7.6 cu in) motocross engine giving 171 cc (10.4 cu in) and using the same port design as the YZ. A 34mm carburetor was used along with a reed intake valve. The bike was given a six-speed gearbox with a very low ratio first gear to help in tackling technical trial sections. The frame was based on that of the YZ but the steering rake was increased to lengthen the bike and improve high speed stability, facilitated by a high sixth gear. Rear suspension adopted lessons learned from the YZ and used a de carbon monoshock unit from Kayaba. Forks had less travel than those of the YZ

Considerable thought was given to features to improve reliability and usability over extended tests. The rear wheel featured a quick release design and a tool carrying kit was mounted to the rear fender.

=== Technicals ===
Compression Ratio => 7.4:1

Induction => 34mm Mikuni Carburetor

Max Power => 21.55 Hp / 15.8 Kw @ 9500RPM

Wheelbase => 1410mm / 55.5 in

Seat Height => 876mm / 34.5 in

Ground Clearance => 254mm / 10 in

Fuel Capacity => 9.5 Liters / 2.5 US Gallons

== 1978 ==
Introduction of the IT175E. Minor changes.

=== Technicals ===
Compression Ratio => 7.4:1

Induction => 34mm Mikuni Carburetor

Max Power => 21.55 Hp / 15.8 Kw @ 9500RPM

Wheelbase => 1410mm / 55.5 in

Seat Height => 876mm / 34.5 in

Ground Clearance => 254mm / 10 in

Fuel Capacity => 9.5 Liters / 2.5 US Gallons

== 1979 ==
The IT175F featured a beefed up frame and more suspension travel as per the mode of the times. The engine tune was modified slightly to give the bike more mid-range power.

The 1979 IT175F model front fork trail was reduced to quicken the steering response and the CDI ignition system was upgraded from the earlier D/E model bikes.....this was the last year for LH side countershaft sprocket model of the IT175.

=== Technicals ===
Compression Ratio => 7.5:1

Induction => 34mm Mikuni Carburetor

Max Power => 20.60 Hp / 15 Kw @ 8500RPM

Wheelbase => 1375mm / 54.1 in

Seat Height => 877mm / 34.5 in

Ground Clearance => 269mm / 10.5 in

Fuel Capacity => 9.5 Liters / 2.5 US Gallons

== 1980 ==
For 1980 the IT175G caught up with the pace of motocross development and shared the frame of the YZ125G. This allowed the rear shock to move to a laid down position, bolted to the top of the frame backbone. The shock itself was adjustable for preload and rebound and a box section aluminum swingarm was used for the first time along with 36mm forks with air caps.

A new engine was developed in 1980, based loosely on the YZ125G. The new engine switched the drive chain to the right side where it has stayed ever since. The engine was detuned to give more usable power and given a 32mm power jet carburetor.

=== Technicals ===
Compression Ratio => 7.9:1

Induction => 32mm Mikuni Carburetor

Max Power => 19.86 Hp / 14.6 Kw @ 8000RPM

Wheelbase => 1417mm / 55.8 in

Seat Height => 899mm / 35.4 in

Ground Clearance => 290mm / 11.4 in

Fuel Capacity => 11 Liters / 2.9 US Gallons

== 1981 ==
IT175H. No major changes other than all white plastics for the U.S. version.

=== Technicals ===
Compression Ratio => 7.9:1

Induction => 32mm Mikuni Carburetor

Max Power => 19.86 Hp / 14.6 Kw @ 8000RPM

Wheelbase => 1417mm / 55.8 in

Seat Height => 899mm / 35.4 in

Ground Clearance => 290mm / 11.4 in

Fuel Capacity => 11 Liters / 2.9 US Gallons

== 1982 ==
IT175J was introduced. This had a better exhaust which provided better power and ground clearance. The transmission was updated to have more torque at lower RPMS. The carburetor is back to 34mm. Yamaha created the YEIS Boost Bottle and this bike had one. The bottle stores intake pulses trapped between the carb and closed reeds, allowing faster throttle response and better low end power.

=== Technicals ===
Compression Ratio => 7.9:1

Induction => 34mm Mikuni Carburetor

Max Power => 19.86 Hp / 14.6 Kw @ 8000RPM

Wheelbase => 1417mm / 55.8 in

Seat Height => 899mm / 35.4 in

Ground Clearance => 290mm / 11.4 in

Fuel Capacity => 11 Liters / 2.9 US Gallons

== 1983 ==
IT175K. Minor upgrade.

=== Technicals ===
Compression Ratio => 7.9:1

Induction => 34mm Mikuni Carburetor

Max Power => 19.86 Hp / 14.6 Kw @ 8000RPM

Wheelbase => 1417mm / 55.8 in

Seat Height => 899mm / 35.4 in

Ground Clearance => 290mm / 11.4 in

Fuel Capacity => 11 Liters / 2.9 US Gallons
