= Yamaha TDR 250 =

Dual-sport motorcycle

Yamaha TDR250
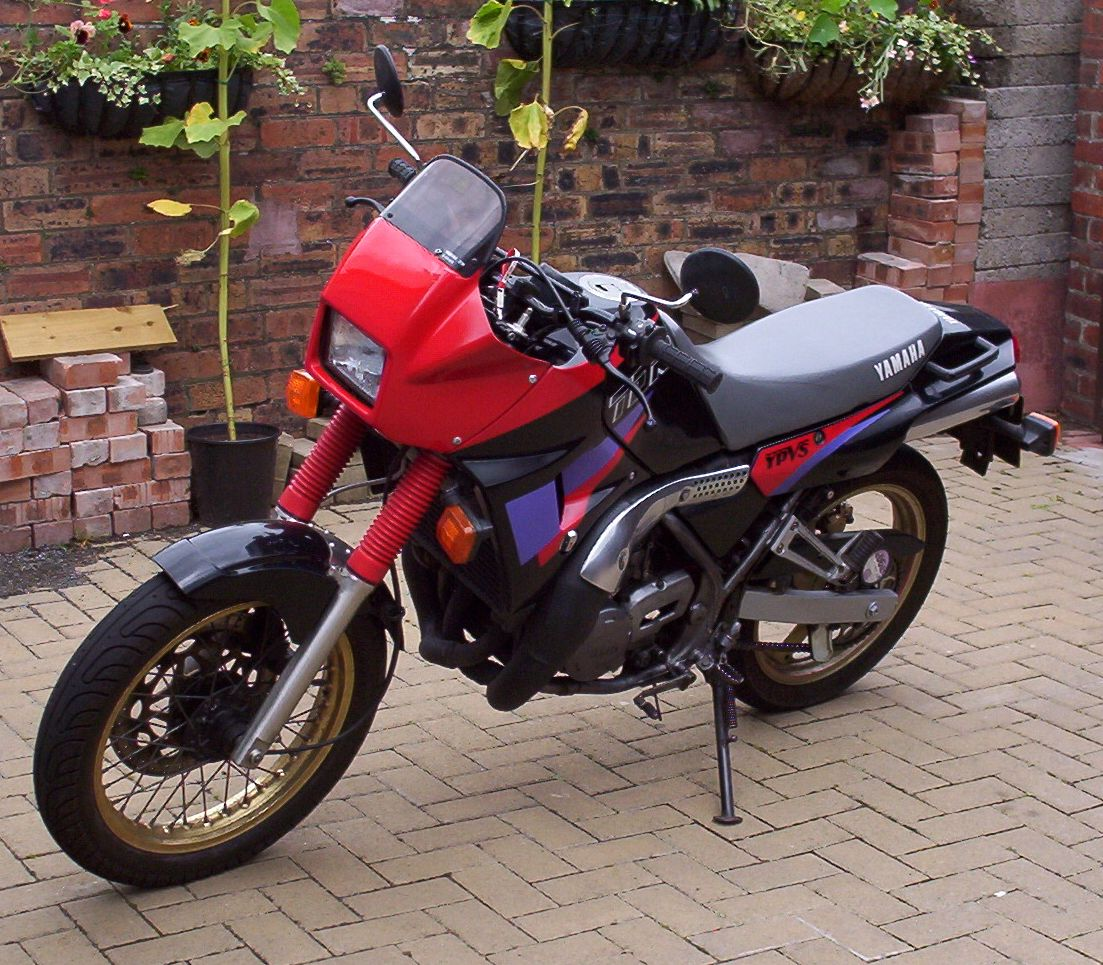
- Manufacturer: Yamaha Motor Company
- Also called: Ultimate Dual
- Production: 1988 - 1993
- Class: Dual Sport
- Engine: 249cc two-Stroke parallel twin YPVS
- Transmission: 6-speed constant mesh manual, chain final drive
- Wheelbase: 1,385 mm (54.5 in)
- Dimensions: L: 2,145 mm (84.4 in); W: 785 mm (30.9 in)
- Seat height: 820 mm (32.3 in)
- Weight: 137 kg (302 lb) (dry)
- Fuel capacity: 14.0 L (4 US gal; 3 imp gal)
- Related: Yamaha TDR 125, Yamaha TZR250

The Yamaha TDR250 was a street-legal middleweight dual-sport bike produced by Japanese motorcycle manufacturer Yamaha between 1988 and 1993.

It was powered by the naturally-aspirated, crankcase reed-valve inducted, liquid-cooled 249cc parallel-twin two-stroke engine from the first generation TZR250 (this same engine also powered the R1-Z). This engine featured the 'YPVS' Yamaha Power Valve System, CDI ignition and digital spark advance. Almost all of the engine, gearbox, and electrical components are interchangeable with the TZR and R1-Z.

The TDR was designed to provide agile handling and quick acceleration both on and off the road, and power delivery was modified to suit its intended use. The special upswept expansion chambers, unique to the TDR, part of this; as well as aiding ground clearance. The bike was originally released in a 250cc format, but a 240cc derivative was also produced exclusively for the French market.

== Specifications of TDR 250 ==
Specifications for 1988 - 1993 model
Engine Type	Parallel Twin Cylinder, Water Cooled, Two-Stroke, YPVS
Carburetion	Mikuni TM28SS x 2
Displacement	249 cc [239 cc]
Bore × Stroke	56.4 x 50.0 mm [55.2 x 50.0 mm]
Peak Power	50.3 PS (37.1 kW) @ 10,000 rpm [44.3 PS (32.6 kW) @ 10,000 rpm]
Peak Torque	3.7 kg-m (36.2 Nm) @8,500 rpm [3.5 kg-m (34.6 Nm) @9,500 rpm]
Compression Ratio	5.9:1 [5.7:11]
Fuel Capacity	14.0 L (4 US gal; 3 imp gal)
Oil Capacity	1.4 L (0.4 US gal; 0.3 imp gal)
Seat Height	820 mm (32.3 in)
Dry Weight	137 kg (302 lb)
Tires	Front 100/90-18H Rear 120/80-17H
Brakes	Front Hydraulic disc, with 320 mm (12.6 in) floating disc and 4-pot opposed-piston caliper. Rear Hydraulic disc, with 210 mm (8.3 in) disc and opposed-piston caliper
Final drive	Chain

Note: [ ]= French Model
