= Yamaha SRX =

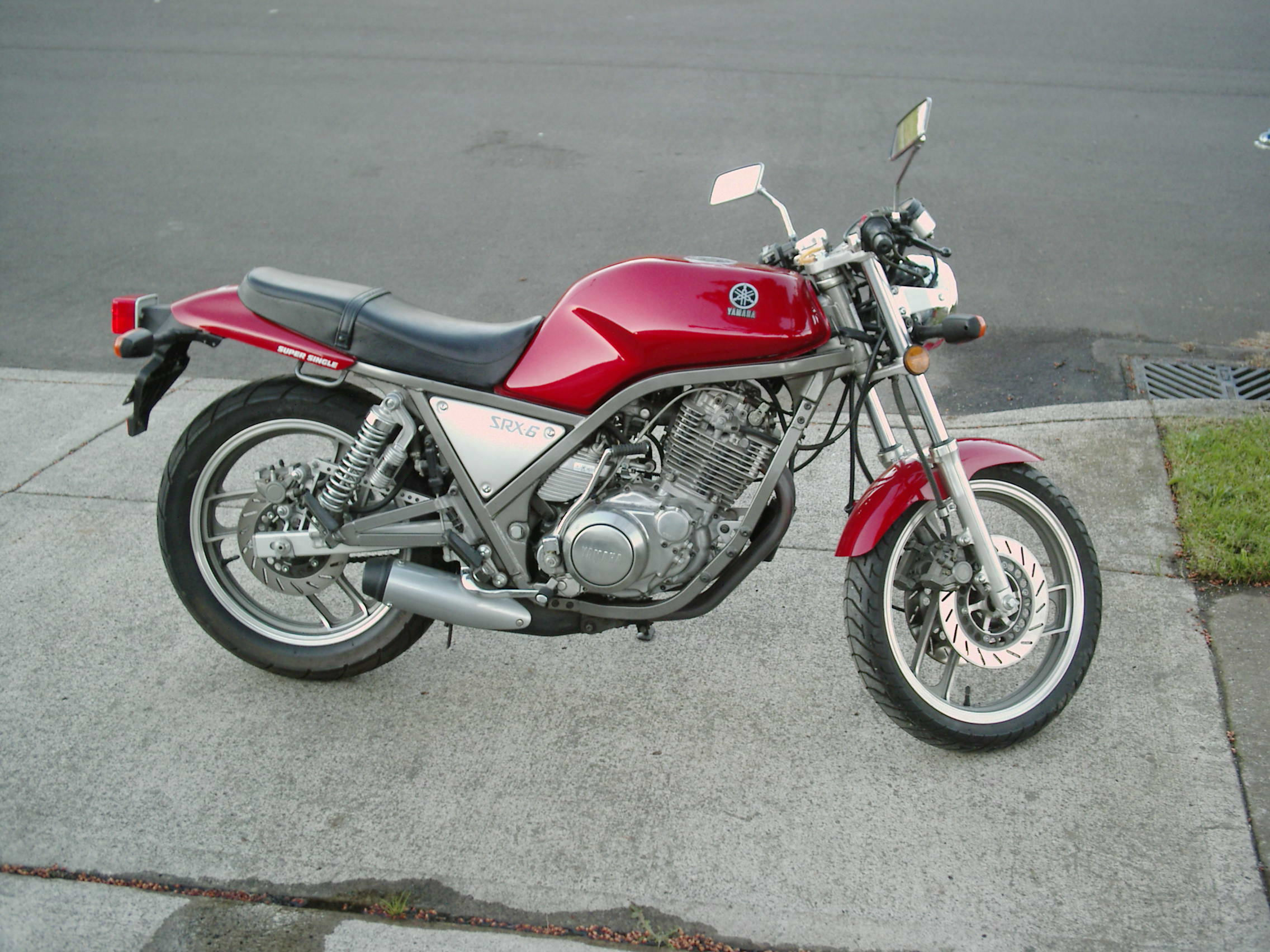
- Stock 1986 Yamaha SRX600
- Manufacturer: Yamaha Motor Company
- Production: 1985-1997
- Assembly: Japan
- Engine: 4-stroke, SOHC, 4-valve, single-cylinder, 608 cc
- Bore / stroke: 96.0 x 84.0 mm
- Compression ratio: 8.5:1
- Top speed: 170 km/h (110 mph)
- Power: 45 hp (34 kW) @ 6500 rpm
- Torque: 34 ft⋅lbf (46 N⋅m) @ 5500 rpm
- Transmission: 5 speed
- Wheelbase: 1,380 mm (54 in)
- Dimensions: L: 2 m (6 ft 7 in); W: 70 cm (28 in); H: 1.05 m (3 ft 5 in)
- Seat height: 770 mm (30 in)
- Weight: 149 kg (328 lb) (dry); 170 kg (370 lb) (wet)
- Fuel capacity: 18 litres (4.0 imp gal; 4.8 US gal)
- Oil capacity: 2.4 litres (2.5 US qt)

The Yamaha SRX is a motorcycle that was manufactured from 1985 to 1997 by the Yamaha Motor Company. Not to be confused with the Yamaha Sidewinder SRX, which is a snowmobile.

In an attempt to repeat the success of the SR500, Yamaha placed a more modern engine derived from the XT600 into a light, sporty street bike. While still being an air-cooled, overhead-camshaft single-cylinder like its predecessor, the new engine featured a four-valved cylinder head, a two-staged carburetor, a balance shaft, and various improvements. The chassis was a lightweight steel frame with alloy wheels, a double disc brake on the front- and a single disc brake on the rear wheel.

However, unlike its cheaper predecessor, the SRX600 did not compete well on the international market. Nimble handling, light weight, and unique styling did not compete well with the heavier, faster multi-cylinder bikes available for a similar price. Still, Yamaha claims to have sold 19,000 units of the SRX. In the US, the SRX was officially sold only in 1986; in Germany, sales continued until 1990; while in Japan the model was produced up until 1997.

== Japanese models ==
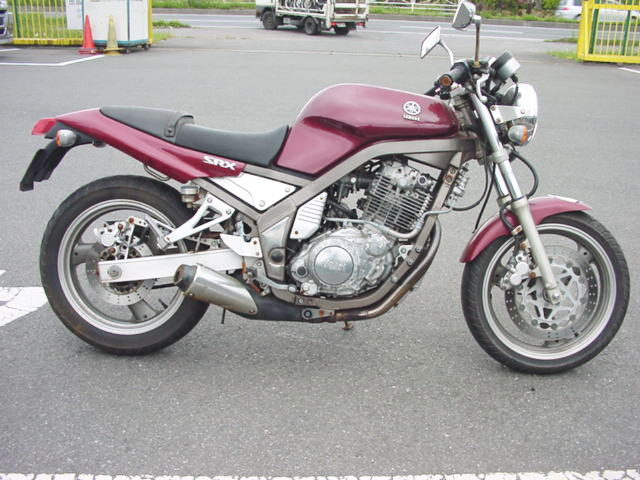
1990 Yamaha SRX400

In Japan, the SRX was sold with a reduced displacement of 400 cc for tax reasons, or 608 cc. Also, these models featured an oil cooler. From 1988, the 2NX model was sold, which featured a 17-inch front wheel and single 320 mm brake disc. There was also an SRX250 on the Japanese market, although this differed somewhat in the presence of a headlight fairing and electric start.

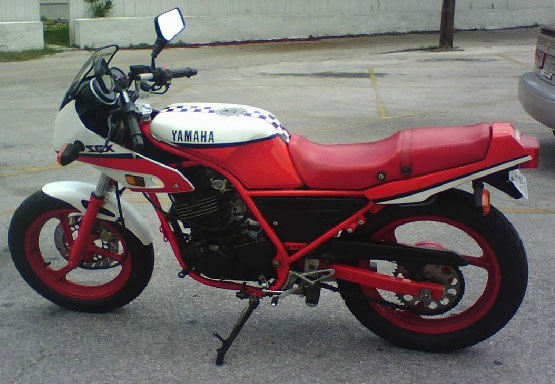
1989 Yamaha SRX250

When the international marketing of the SRX stopped, in Japan there was a new production line 3VN; it received an engine derived from the newer XT600E, equipped with an electrical starter. Also, the classic twin-shock configuration was dropped for a mono shock design. This iteration was produced until 1997, when production altogether ceased. The SRX was outlived by its predecessor - the SR400 was still available in 2015.

== Specifications ==
=== Engine ===
- Type: Four-stroke, SOHC, 4-valve, single-cylinder
- Displacement: 608 cc
- Bore and Stroke: 96.0 x 84.0 mm
- Compression Ratio: 8.5:1
- Maximum torque: 34 ft⋅lbf (46 N⋅m) @ 5500 rpm
- Maximum horsepower: 45 hp (34 kW) @ 6500 rpm
- Carburetion: two-stage YDIS intake system, 2KY27PV
- Oil capacity: 2.4 liters (2.5 U.S. qt)
- Lubrication: Dry sump
- Transmission: 5 speed

=== Chassis ===
- Wheelbase: 1,380 mm (54 in)
- Ground Clearance: 150 mm (5.9 in)
- Seat Height: 770 mm (30 in)
- Dry Weight: 149 kg (328 lb)
- Wet Weight: 170 kg (370 lb)
