= Yamaha XT125R =

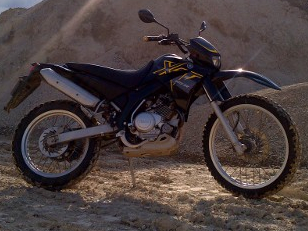
- Manufacturer: Yamaha Motor Company
- Parent company: Yamaha
- Predecessor: XT125
- Successor: 2010 2770
- Class: Enduro, adventure
- Engine: 124 cc (7.6 cu in) single
- Transmission: 5-speed sequential manual
- Rake, trail: , 114.4 mm (4.50 in)
- Wheelbase: 1,335 mm (52.6 in)
- Dimensions: L: 1,995 mm (78.5 in); W: 840 mm (33 in)
- Seat height: 860 mm (34 in)
- Weight: 111 kg (245 lb) (dry); 122.2 kg (269 lb) (wet)
- Fuel capacity: 10 L (2.2 imp gal; 2.6 US gal)
- Related: DT125RE; XT125X; YBR125

The Yamaha XT125R is a four-stroke, single cylinder enduro/adventure motorcycle. It was made by Yamaha since the 2003 model year. It shares its power plant with the YBR125 and its supermoto brother, the Yamaha XT125X. While parts such as the transmission and chassis are produced in Japan, and the engine in Brazil, the motorcycle itself is assembled in Bologna, Italy for the European market by the Italian bike company Malaguti.

The 21-inch front wheel and the 18-inch rear with enduro-style tires make it fit for both on- and off-road use. Seat height and ground clearance are higher compared to the Supermotard version and the machine features the typical dual-purpose handling characteristics, which makes it suitable for a wide range of duties, from crossing rough city roads to small country lanes or paths.

The XT range debuted in 1976 with the XT500 single four-stroke "torque hammer". Later, other models followed spreading from XT125 to the latest XT660. Both the XT and DT ranges represent the typical Yamaha model development consistency, with model refinements over a long period of time.

The old version of XT125 (1982–1994 series) is not very different from newer models and almost identical to DT125 but almost no one is talking about It. On English language internet there isn't much information about It,

The old XT125 had also Air-Cooled SOHC four-stroke single cylinder engine (used in later models too), It has Front, and Rear drum brakes, 7 liter fuel tank, and it weighs 98 kg. It has display identical to DT125 with analog milage, speed, rev counter, and controls for high beam, indicator and neutral

The XT 125R has an electronic display with different selectable modes: numbered RPM, lap timer, mileage, average speed, clock and trip distance. The standard display is a bar displayed rev-counter along with a speed reading. Lights on the side of the display indicate high beam and low beam, low fuel, indicators and neutral.

In 2012, Yamaha ceased retailing the XT 125 range in the United Kingdom. There is also an X variant model.
