= Yamaha XS400 =

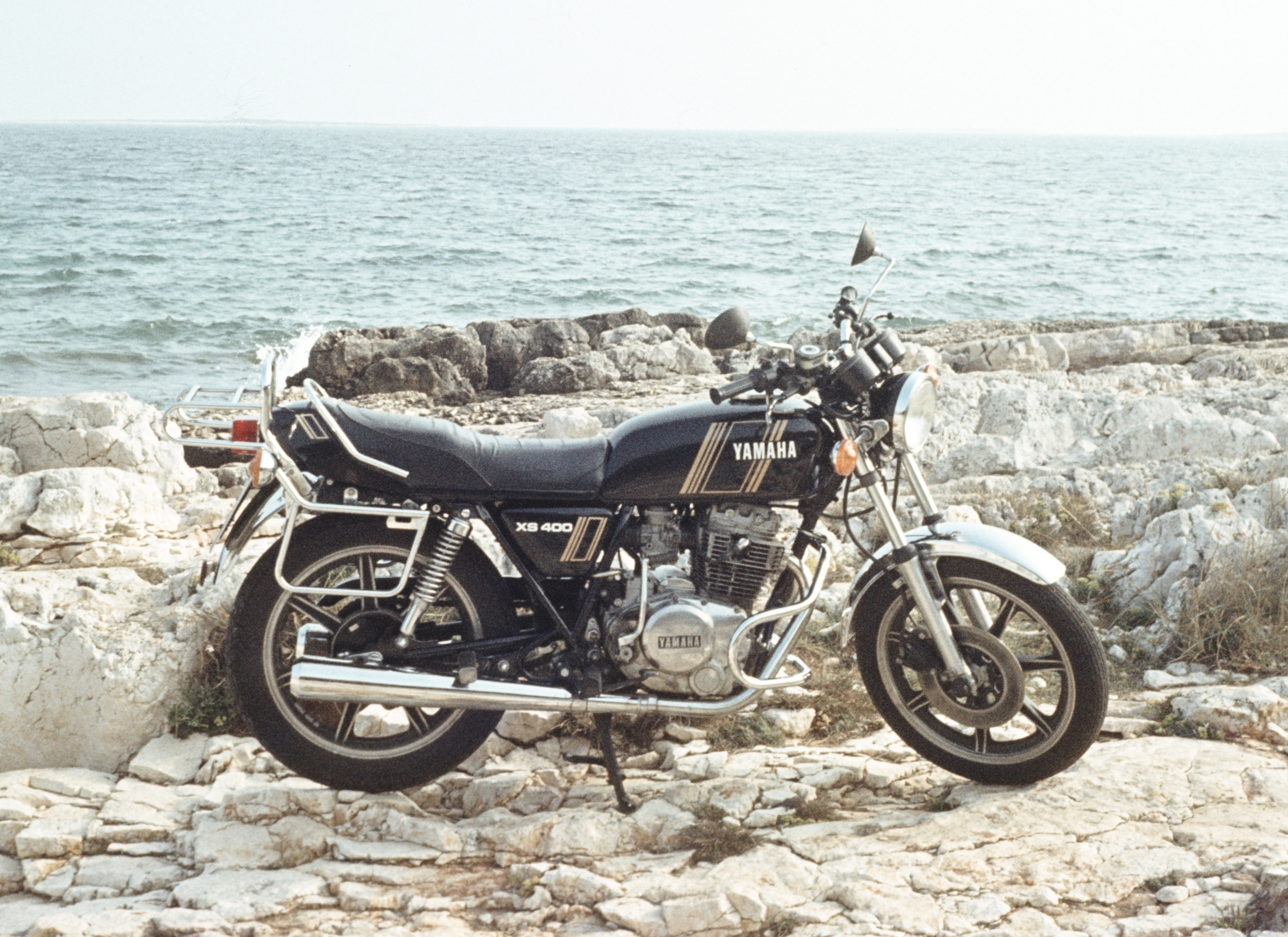
- Production: 1977–1983
- Predecessor: Yamaha RD250/RD400
- Engine: 4-stroke 391 cc air-cooled twin engine
- Top speed: 175 km/h (109 mph)
- Power: 37 PS (27 kW; 36 bhp) at 8800 rpm
- Transmission: 6-speed
- Suspension: F: Telescoping fork. R: Dual adjustable shock absorber
- Brakes: F: single-piston disc R: drum/disc
- Weight: 175–182 kg (386–401 lb) (wet)
- Fuel capacity: 17 L (4.5 US gal)

The Yamaha XS400 was produced by Yamaha from 1977 to 1983. It was Yamaha's first four-stroke offering in the 400 (as well as 250-cc) class and replaced the earlier RD series. The XS250 and XS360 are nearly identical variations of the same XS400 platform. XS is the export market name; in Japan these were sold as the GX250 and GX400 and were introduced in May 1977. Special, Special II, and Heritage badges denoted "factory custom" trim lines.

The XS400 had a four-stroke, air-cooled, overhead-cam straight-twin engine with a 180° crank angle, which reduces linear vibration at the cost of some axial vibration. The 391 cc (23.9 cu in) engine produces 37 PS (27 kW; 36 bhp) at 8800 rpm and 3.2 kg⋅m (31 N⋅m; 23 lb⋅ft) torque at 8000 rpm. Weight is approximately 175 kg (386 lb) (Japanese trim, including oil, gas, etc.), and the fuel capacity is 14 L (3.7 US gal). The XS250's 248 cc (15.1 cu in) engine produces 25 PS (18 kW; 25 bhp) at 9500 rpm and 19 N⋅m (14 lb⋅ft) torque at 8500 rpm, with the smaller model weighing in at 168 kg (370 lb).

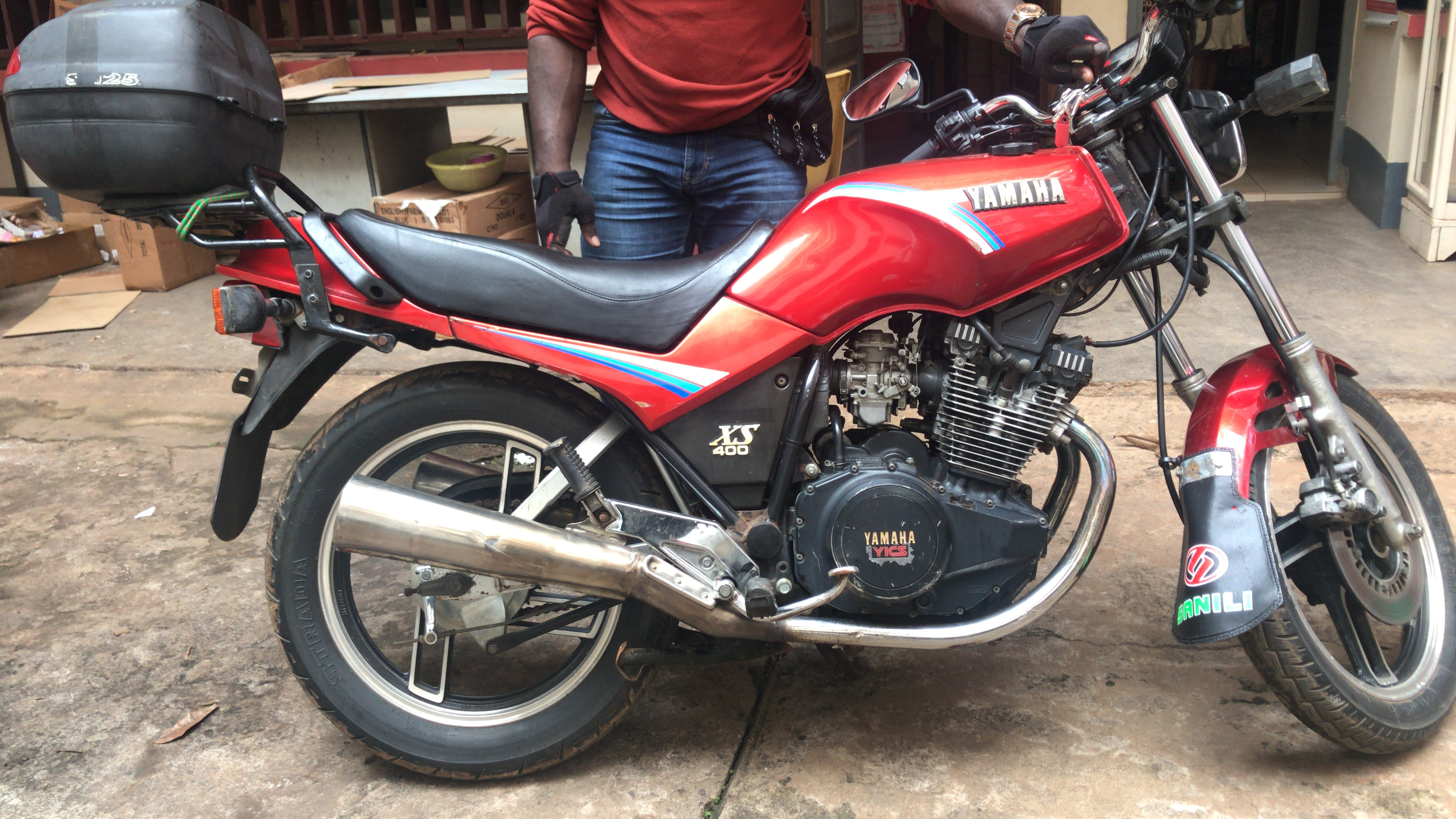
Yamaha XS400

A dual overhead-cam variant (XS400k) was also produced in 1982 and 1983 with a rear mono-shock and updated styling.

The XS400 came equipped with a 6-speed transmission, wet plate, six-plate friction disk clutch, chain drive, tachometer, self-canceling turn signals, both electric and kick starters, adjustable rear shock absorbers, center stand, and an automatic fuel petcock. Early and economy models came with spoked wheels and drum brakes, while later and upgraded models received cast alloy wheels and hydraulic disc brakes. Later models also upgraded the early mechanical points ignition system to a modern solid state electronic system.

In Japan, the GX series was marketed as a "sporting road bike", rather than an economic bike, and was accordingly better equipped than typical export examples. For example, the GX400 received standard disc brakes, front and rear, from the beginning. cast wheels first arrived in 1978 and included a change to the name, to GX250 SP/400 SP.

The number in the model name indicates the engine displacement. Aside from displacement, the 250 cc, 360 cc, and 400 cc variants were mostly identical except for some economy-minded XS250s, XS360s and XS400s which omitted the electric starter and self-canceling turn signals. The upgraded Special and Heritage trim levels included styling changes such as stepped seats, megaphone-style exhaust pipes, and swept-back handlebars. The original model was very similar to the RD predecessor, with a similar, square fuel tank. This was later replaced with a teardrop-shaped tank.
