= Yamaha XT200 =

Yamaha XT 200
- Manufacturer: Yamaha Motor Corporation
- Also called: XT 200J
- Production: 1980–1987
- Class: Dual-sport
- Engine: 196 cc (12.0 cu in) 4-stroke Single-cylinder two-valve engine SOHC
- Bore / stroke: 67 mm × 55.7 mm (2.64 in × 2.19 in)
- Compression ratio: 9.5:1
- Top speed: 77 km/h (48 mph)
- Power: 18 hp (13 kW)
- Torque: 1.6 kg⋅m (16 N⋅m; 12 lbf⋅ft) @ 8,000 rpm
- Transmission: 5-speed Sequential
- Brakes: SLS Front / Rear Drum
- Tires: F: 2.75-21-4PR; R: 4.10-18-4PR
- Weight: 98 kg (216 lb) (dry)
- Oil capacity: 1 L (0.22 imp gal; 0.26 US gal)

The Yamaha XT 200 is a single-cylinder four-stroke Dual Sport motorcycle produced by the Yamaha Motor Corporation starting in 1980 through 1986. It is powered by a single-cylinder, 196 cm^{3} (12.0 cu in) air-cooled engine. The motorcycle was sold with street parts installed such as mirrors, a horn, high/low-beam headlight, tail/brake light, and front and rear turn signals. The motorcycle runs on a 6-volt system. Top speed 76mph also 5 and 6 speed transmissions used; 2.1 gallons 65 gallons pr mile

The XT line of motorcycles was introduced in 1976. "XT" is an abbreviation for "Cross Trail". Closely related to the XT200 are the XT125 and XT250 motorcycles. The engine and frame components would later become the basis for the AG200, the BW200\TW200 and the XT225.
