= Yamaha XV125 =

- Manufacturer: Yamaha
- Production: 1997–2004
- Engine: 124 cc
- Power: 8.3 kW (11.1 hp) @ 8,500 rpm
- Torque: 9 N⋅m (6.6 lb⋅ft) @ 8,500 rpm
- Transmission: 5-speed
- Wheelbase: 1,495 mm (58.9 in)
- Seat height: 685 mm (27.0 in)
- Weight: 139 kg (306 lb) (wet)

The Yamaha XV125 is a cruiser motorcycle built by the Yamaha Motor Company, which was produced from 1997 to 2004. The XV 125 Virago is, apart from the 125cc-smaller displacement, identical to the larger sister model Yamaha XV250 Virago.

The Virago 125 is equipped with an air-cooled two-cylinder four-stroke engine, which initially developed a power of 7.3 kW / 10 hp (1997) and later developed a power of 8.3 kW / 11.4 hp (1998–2002). Power is transmitted to the road through a five-speed chain drive.
