= Yamaha SDR 200 =

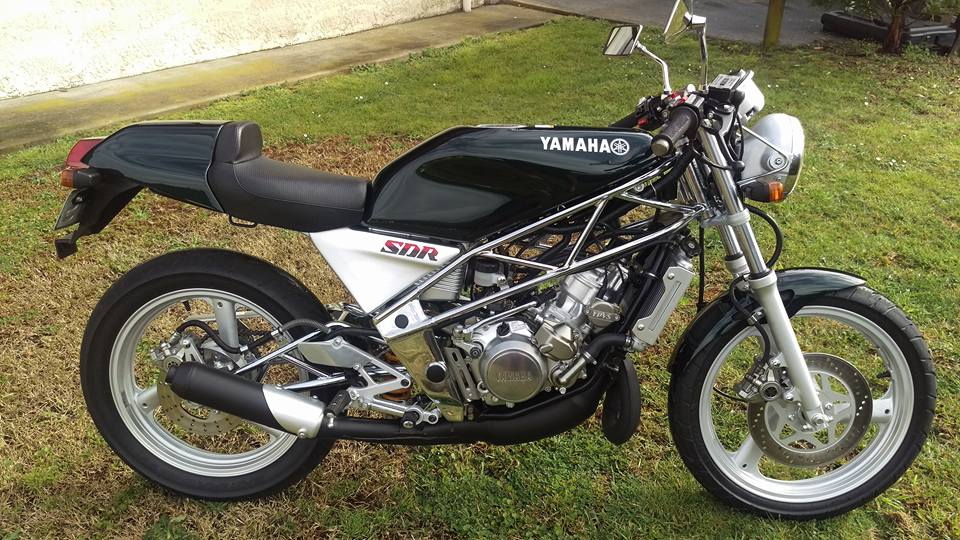
- Manufacturer: Yamaha
- Also called: The Whippet
- Production: 1986 - 1987
- Class: Sport
- Engine: Water-cooled two-stroke single YPVS
- Transmission: 6-speed constant mesh
- Wheelbase: 1,335 mm (52.6 in)
- Dimensions: L: 1,945 mm (76.6 in); W: 680 mm (26.8 in)
- Seat height: 770 mm (30.3 in)
- Weight: 105 kg (231 lb) (dry); 115 kg (254 lb) (wet)
- Fuel capacity: 9.5 L (3 US gal; 2 imp gal)
- Related: DT200R
- Ground clearance: 160 mm (6.3 in)

The Yamaha SDR200 is a 200 cc single-cylinder two-stroke motorcycle manufactured and sold from 1986 to 1987. Although it was intended for the Japanese home market only, a few examples have escaped as grey imports.

Its distinguishing characteristics are its diminutive size and a chrome trellis frame similar to that of a Ducati Monster.
