= Yamaha YD1 =

1957 racing motorcycle

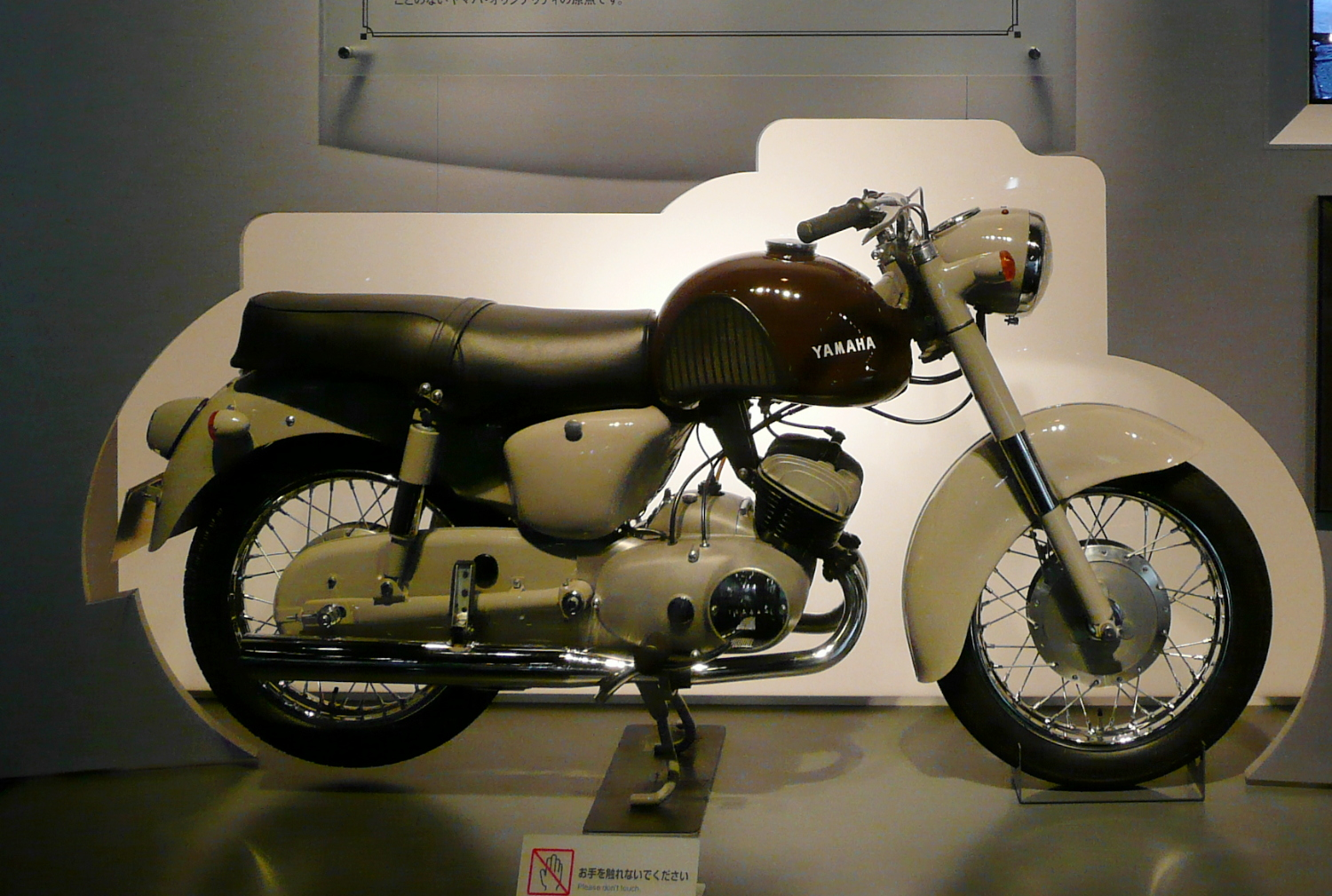
- Manufacturer: Yamaha Motor Company
- Production: 1957–1958
- Successor: Yamaha RD48
- Class: Race Bike
- Engine: 247cc two-stroke

The Yamaha YD1 was Yamaha's first racing motorcycle, built for participation in the 2nd Asama Highlands Race in 1957.

== Description ==
The YD1 was equipped with a 247 cc air cooled two-stroke mounted in a double-cradle frame. Two different versions were produced, the YD-A and YD-B with stroke ratio specifications of 54x54mm and 56x50mm respectively. The light weight of the bike made it very formidable in terms of handling and acceleration compared to rival bikes of the era, such as the Honda RC71. In 1957, the YD1 won 1st-3rd place at the 2nd All Japan Autobike Endurance Road Race (Asama Highlands Race).

Yamaha decided to differentiate itself from its previous YA1 design by creating a new engine with two in-line cylinders, 2 strokes, and 247 cubic centimeters, cooled by air. This innovative approach signified Yamaha's entry into the 2.5 cubic centimeter category, hence earning it the title “the first two and a half for Yamaha.”
