= Yamaha L2 =

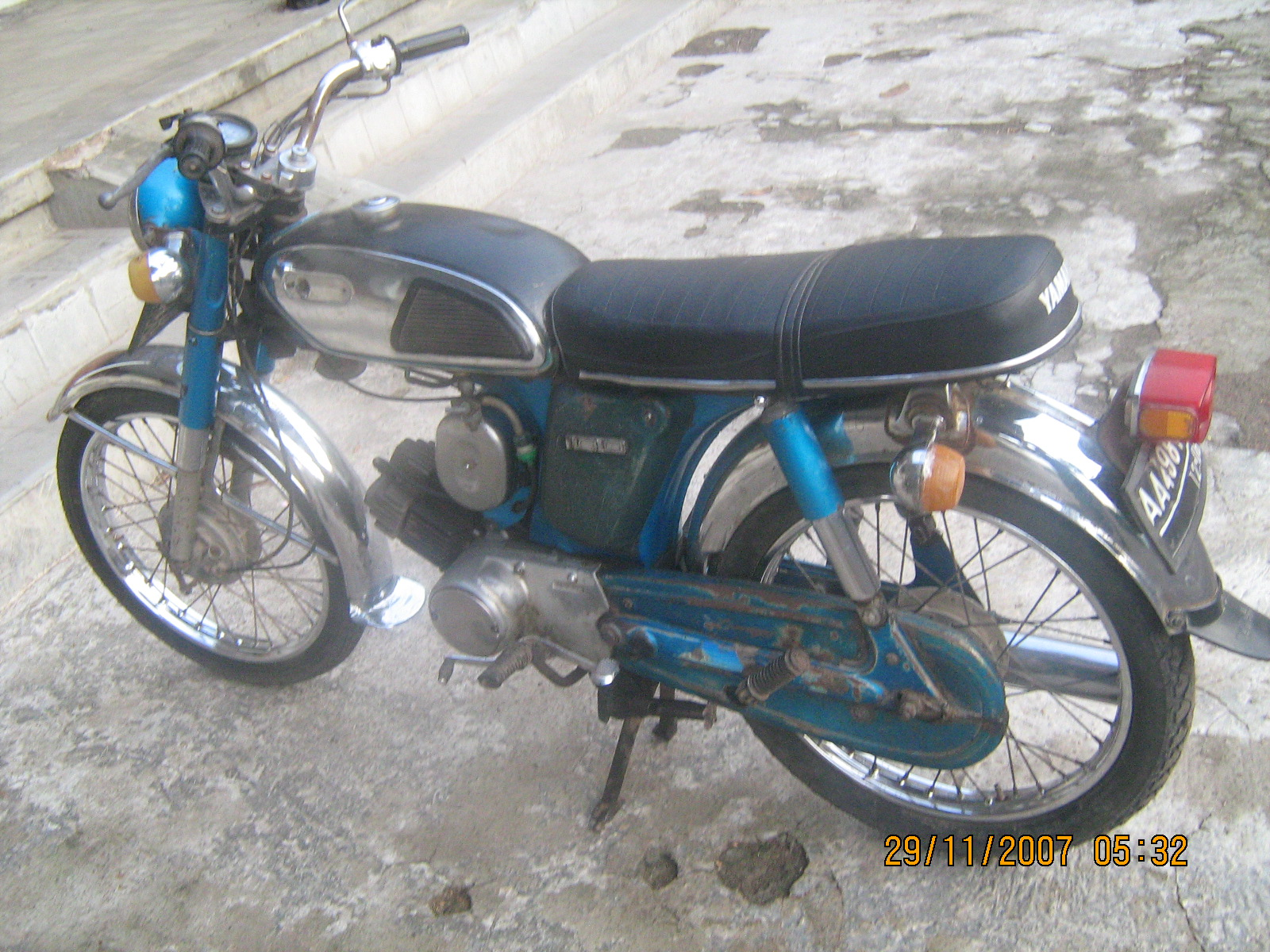
1979 Yamaha L2

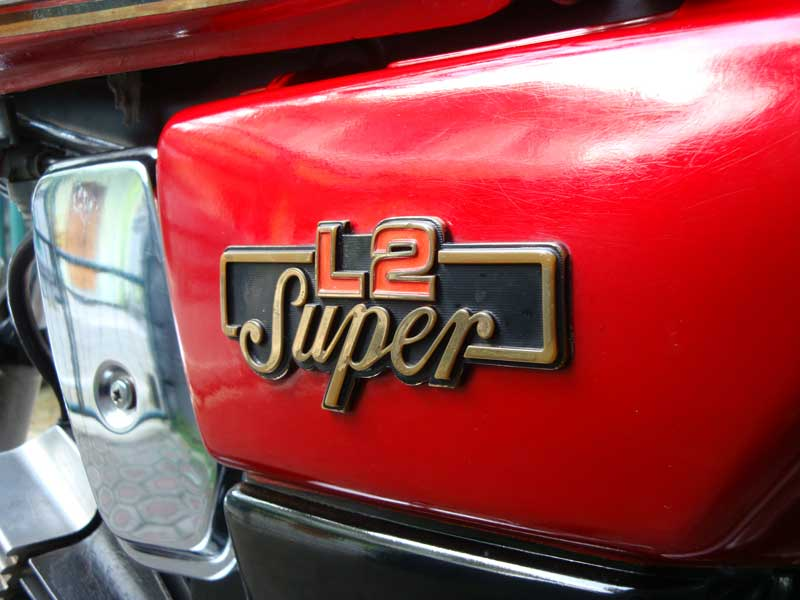
Yamaha L2 Super (1984) left emblem

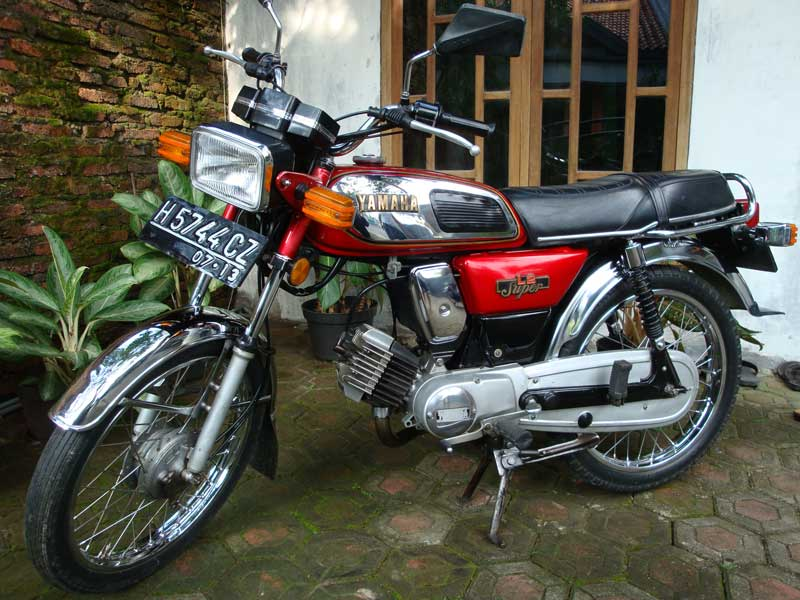
Yamaha L2 Super (1984)

Yamaha L2 is a motorcycle produced by Yamaha in Indonesia from 1967 until 1979. In 1980 it was replaced by the L2 Super. The 97 cc two-stroke engine uses a lubrication system named Autolube, with separate oil and fuel tanks.
