= Yamaha XV920R =

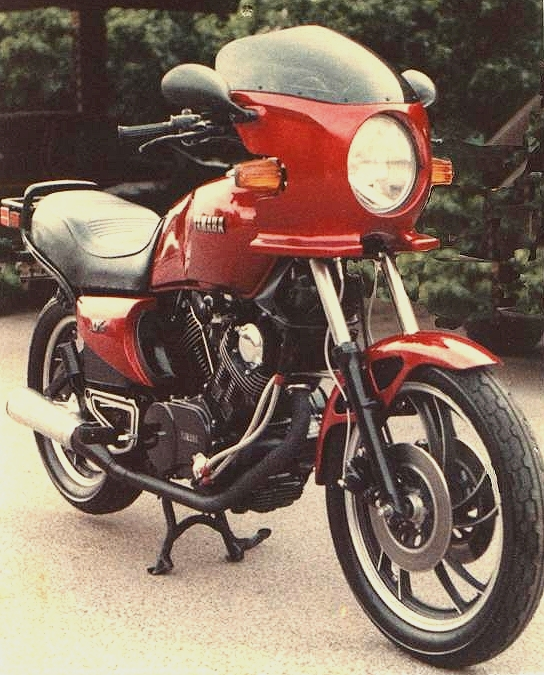

The Yamaha XV920R is a Japanese motorcycle. It was introduced in 1981, along with the XV750 Virago. In addition to larger engine displacement it featured "standard" styling and technical features, in contrast to the cruiser style of the Virago. This model was geared toward European-style sport touring.

The XV920R had a unique enclosed chain final drive, a large, 8-inch-diameter (200 mm) headlamp, a high-capacity sculpted fuel tank, and rear-set controls and footpegs. Like the Virago, it had a stamped-steel backbone frame, also serving as part of the air-induction system. It had a mono-shock rear suspension, with (air) preload and damper adjustments. The front suspension had air preload adjustment only.

In 1981 (XV920RH) it was offered only in candy metalflake maroon. In 1982 (XV920RJ), the only color offered in the United States was silver with black trim. US sales were discontinued after 1982, with many units still unsold. The rear end styling, with its swingarm-mounted fender (now commonplace), drew much criticism. The bike was also sold in Europe with 980 cc displacement, and called "TR1". European sales were more successful, and continued, with slight styling and color modifications (including a switch to more 'mainstream' rear-end styling), through 1986.

Currently popular with a cafe racer and modified bike builders, because of the V twin engine and monoshock design.
