= Yamaha BW200 =

BW200 "Big Wheel"
- Manufacturer: Yamaha
- Production: 1985-1989
- Engine: 196 cc 4-stroke, 2 valve, air cooled, SOHC
- Power: 15.42
- Torque: 10.80 lb-ft @ 7500rpm
- Transmission: 5-speed, manual clutch
- Suspension: Front: 6.3" (160mm) Telescopic fork, Rear: 6.3" (160mm) Dual Shock Swing Arm
- Brakes: Front and rear drum
- Tires: Front: 25x8-12, Rear: 23x12-9
- Wheelbase: 54.3" (1380mm)
- Dimensions: L: 78.1" (1985mm); W: 32.7" (830mm); H: 42.9" (1090mm)
- Seat height: 31.3" (795mm)
- Weight: 258 lbs (dry)
- Fuel capacity: 1.7 gal
- Related: BW80 / 350

Yamaha BW200 "Big Wheel" is a dual purpose dirt bike which was produced from 1985 to 1989. It consisted of three different model lines; the BW80, BW200 and BW350.
