= Yamaha X-City =

Yamaha X-City (VP250)
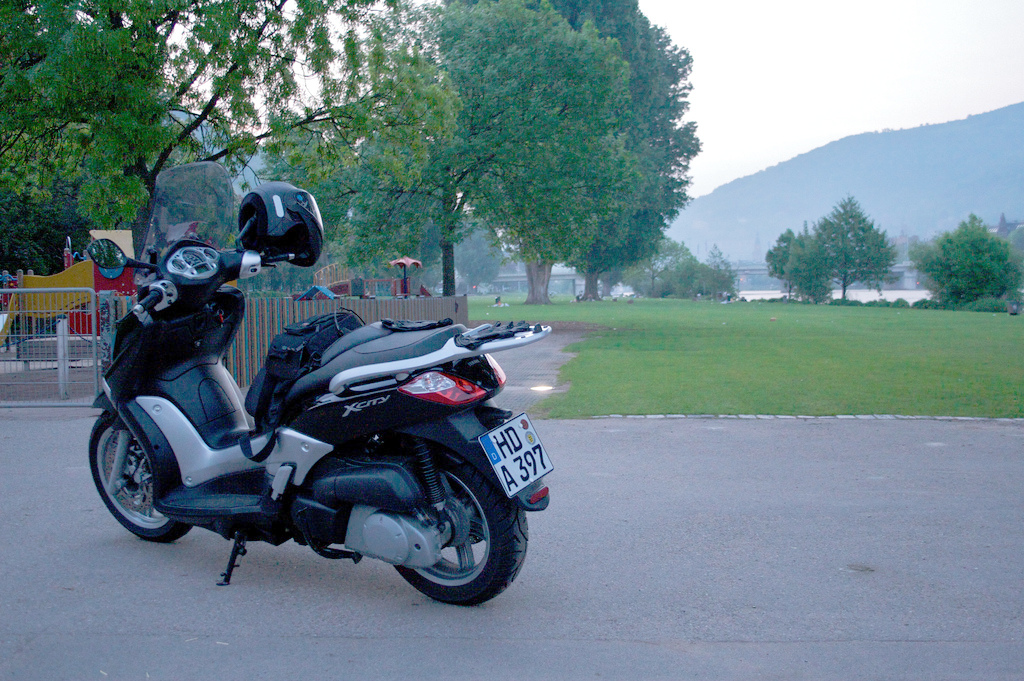
- Manufacturer: Yamaha
- Production: 2007–2016
- Class: Maxi-Scooter
- Engine: 124.6 and 249 cc 4-stroke
- Bore / stroke: 125: 52.0 mm × 58.6 mm (2.05 in × 2.31 in); 250: 69.0 mm × 66.8 mm (2.72 in × 2.63 in)
- Compression ratio: 125 11.2:1; 250 10:1
- Power: 250cc: 21 hp/15.6 kW @ 7500 rpm 125cc: 15 hp/10.76 kW @ 8750 rpm
- Torque: 250cc: 21.5 Nm @ 5800 rpm 125cc: 11.7 Nm @ 8750 rpm
- Transmission: V-Belt Automatic (CVT)
- Suspension: Front: Telescopic fork/100 mm - Rear: Unit swing/105 mm
- Brakes: Disk: Front Ø 270 mm, Rear Ø 240 mm
- Tires: Front 120/70-16, Rear 140/70-15
- Wheelbase: 125: 1,455 mm (57.3 in); 250: 1,470 mm (58 in)
- Dimensions: L: 125: 2,175 mm (85.6 in); 250: 2,215 mm (87.2 in); W: 125 & 250: 785 mm (30.9 in); H: 125: 1,460 mm (57 in); 250: 1,475 mm (58.1 in)
- Seat height: 790 mm (31 in)
- Weight: 125: 167 kg (368 lb); 250: 173 kg (381 lb) (wet)
- Fuel capacity: 10.5 L (2.3 imp gal; 2.8 US gal), including 2.7 L (0.59 imp gal; 0.71 US gal) reserve

The Yamaha X-City 125/250 is a large-wheeled, fuel-injected Maxiscooter introduced in 2007, with either a 125 cc or 250 cc engine — both water-cooled, four-stroke, catalytic-converter-equipped and Euro 3 compliant. The models are internally designated VP125 and VP250, respectively, and each features a fully automatic transmission.

Manufactured and assembled by Yamaha in Italy, the X-City uses engines by Minarelli. The X-City features a 16-inch front and 15 inch rear wheel. The X-City's underseat trunk can accommodate one helmet and has a front lockable glovebox. Instrumentation features speedometer, odometer, fuel gauge, coolant temperature, and ambient temperature gauge with frost warning. The fuel tank can hold 10.5 liters.

Marketed in Europe, primarily Italy, France, Spain, UK and Germany — but not in Asia or North America — the X-City supersedes the Yamaha Varsity 300 and was itself followed by the Yamaha X-MAX. The 2009 X-City received a four-position, height adjustable windshield and a rear carrier base.
