= Yamaha YZM500 =

Two wheeler vehicle

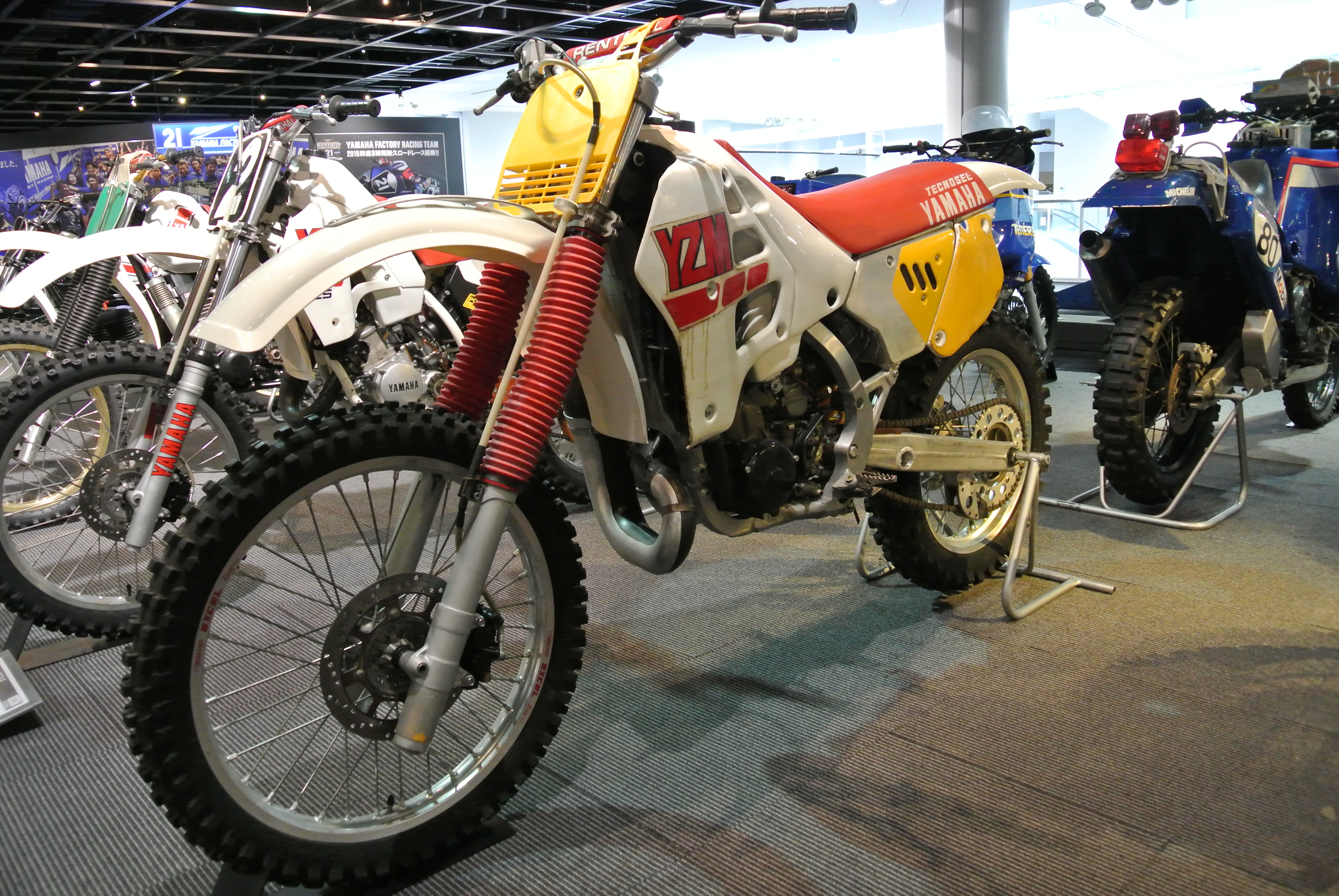
YZM500

The Yamaha YZM500 was a motocross bike produced by Yamaha Motor Company in 1988.

This bike was originally engineered for the 500cc 1988 World Champion Hakan Carlqvist, but he was fired by Yamaha at the end of 1986 after having modified his bike without his team's authorization. Jacky Vimond won the 500cc Sweden GP overall in 1988 using the Yamaha YZM500, after which Yamaha stopped producing the model.

The YZM500 was the first motocross bike to use an aluminum frame. It was the last 500cc motocross bike that Yamaha produced.
