= Yamaha XMAX =

Series of maxi-scooters by Yamaha

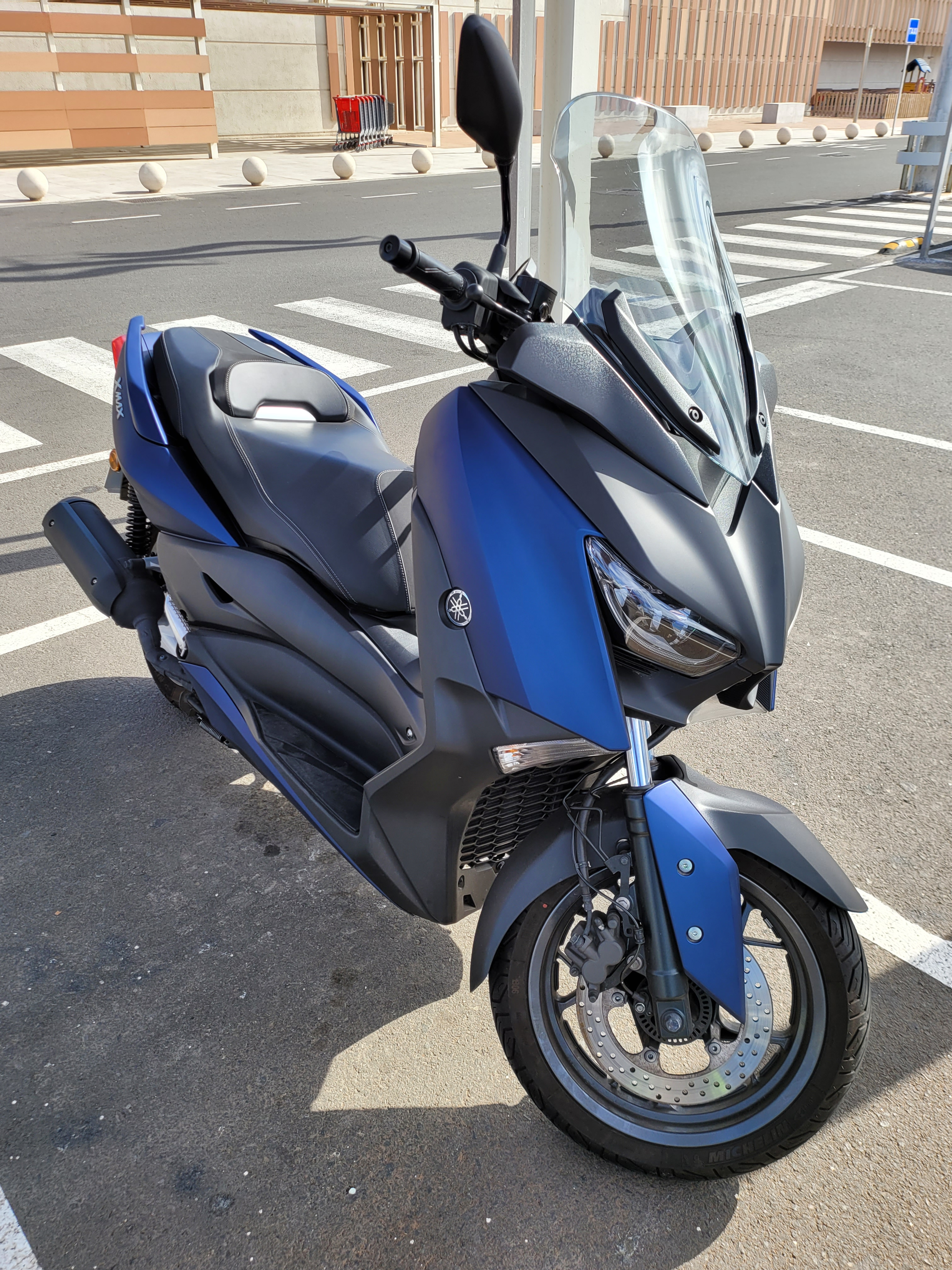
- Yamaha XMAX 125, Model 2017 (2006–2016)
- Manufacturer: Yamaha Motor Company
- Also called: MBK Evolis
- Production: 2006–present
- Assembly: Indonesia: Pulo Gadung, East Jakarta (PT Yamaha Indonesia Motor Manufacturing; since 2017; 125cc–300cc variants); France: Saint-Quentin (Yamaha Motor Manufacturing Europe; 400cc variants)
- Predecessor: Yamaha Versity, Yamaha Majesty
- Class: Maxi-scooter

The Yamaha XMAX is a series of maxi-scooters manufactured by Yamaha Motor Company since 2006.

It is available in four engines (the 125, 250, 300 and the 400 cm3), and is enjoying strong commercial success in Europe. It belongs to the GT category because of its lines, its sportiness and its comfort. In 2010, Yamaha marketed a model revised and corrected to pass European emission standard Euro 3. In 2017, Yamaha marketed the 300 model meeting Euro 4 standards, the 125 model in 2021 met the Euro 5 standards.

== Model updates ==
=== 2017 ===
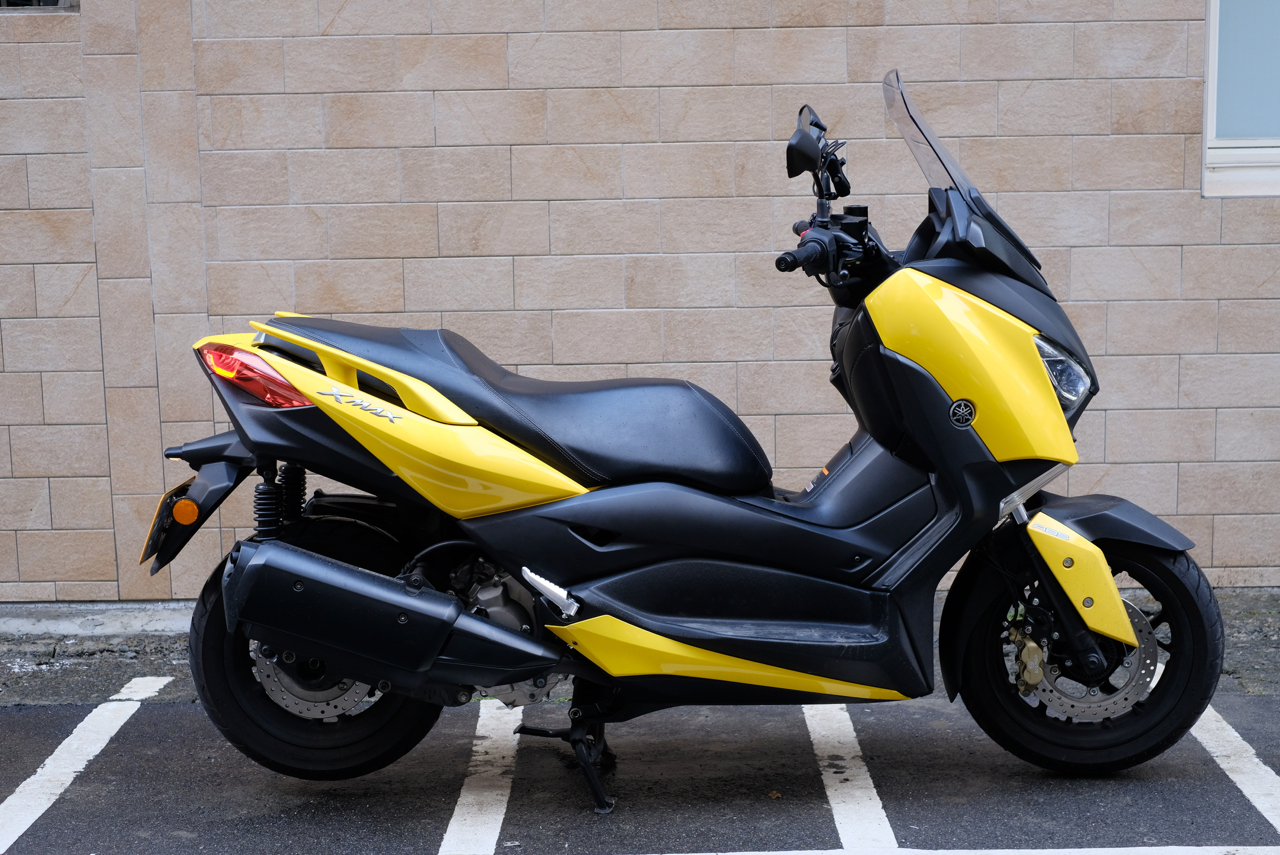
Yamaha XMAX 300 (2017–present)

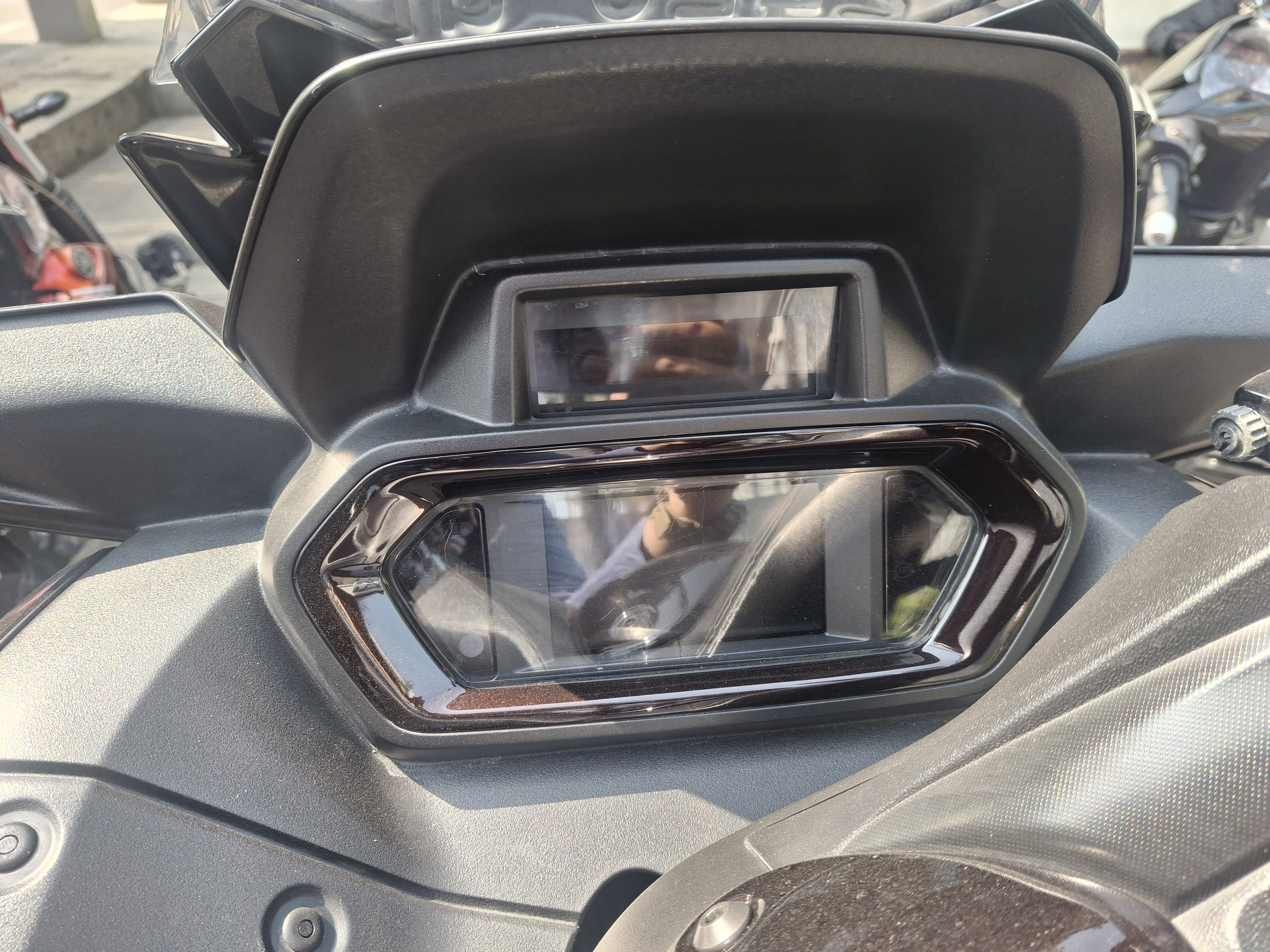
Display of Yamaha Xmax

In 2017, Yamaha revamped the XMAX with different overall styling, along with the introduction of ABS and traction control system. Going forward, the 125cc to 300cc model is assembled in Indonesia for both local and export markets as Yamaha's global scooter model, whereas the 400cc variant is still assembled in France for European markets only. From this generation, the 125cc model assembly was moved from France to Indonesia for export only, specifically for A1 driver license holders in Europe.

== Specifications ==
	XMAX 125	XMAX 250 Tech MAX	2020 XMAX 300	2020 XMAX 400
Engine
Engine Type	124 cc (7.6 cu in) single cylinder four-stroke	249 cc (15.2 cu in) single cylinder four-stroke	292 cc (17.8 cu in) single cylinder four-stroke	395 cc (24.1 cu in) single cylinder four-stroke
Bore/Stroke	52.0 mm × 58.6 mm (2.05 in × 2.31 in)	70.0 mm × 64.9 mm (2.76 in × 2.56 in)	70.0 mm × 75.9 mm (2.76 in × 2.99 in)	83.0 mm × 73.0 mm (3.27 in × 2.87 in)
Compression Ratio	11.2:1	10.5:1 (±0.4)	10.9:1	10.6:1
Drivetrain
Transmission	V-Belt Automatic			
Front Suspension	Telescopic fork		Telescopic fork	
Rear Suspension	Unit Swing		Unit Swing	
Front Brakes	Hydraulic single disc, Ø267 mm (ABS)			Hydraulic double disc, Ø267 mm (ABS)
Rear Brakes	Hydraulic single disc, Ø245 mm (ABS)			Hydraulic single disc, Ø267 mm (ABS)
Front Tire	120/70-15"			
Rear Tire	140/70-14"			150/70-13"
Electricity
Ignition	TCI: Transistor Controlled Ignition			
Battery	12V 7Ah			
Dimensions
Wheelbase	1,526 mm (60.1 in)	1,540 mm (61 in)		1,567 mm (61.7 in)
Length	2,185 mm (86.0 in)			
Width	775 mm (30.5 in)			766 mm (30.2 in)
Seat height	795 mm (31.3 in)			800 mm (31 in)
Wet Weight	175 kg (386 lb)	179 kg (395 lb)	179 kg (395 lb)	210 kg (460 lb)
Liquids capacity
Fuel	13 L (2.9 imp gal; 3.4 US gal), including 2.4 L (0.53 imp gal; 0.63 US gal) reserve			
Engine oil	1.40 L (0.31 imp gal; 0.37 US gal) 1.50 L (0.33 imp gal; 0.40 US gal) with oil filter removal	1.50 L (0.33 imp gal; 0.40 US gal) 1.60 L (0.35 imp gal; 0.42 US gal) with oil filter removal		1.50 L (0.33 imp gal; 0.40 US gal) 1.70 L (0.37 imp gal; 0.45 US gal) with oil filter removal
Cooling system	0.85 L (0.19 imp gal; 0.22 US gal)	1.10 L (0.24 imp gal; 0.29 US gal)		1.30 L (0.29 imp gal; 0.34 US gal)
Performance
Power Output	10.5 kW (14 hp) @ 8750 rpm	16.8 kW (23 hp) @ 7000 rpm	20.6 kW (28 hp) @ 7250 rpm	24.5 kW (33 hp) @ 7000 rpm
Torque	12 N-m @ 6500 rpm	24.3 N-m @ 5500 rpm	29 N-m @ 5750 rpm	36 N-m @ 6000 rpm
Fuel consumption	2.7 L/100 km (105 mpg_{‑imp}; 87 mpg_{‑US})	3.1 L/100 km (91 mpg_{‑imp}; 76 mpg_{‑US})	3.2 L/100 km (88 mpg_{‑imp}; 74 mpg_{‑US})	4.18 L/100 km (68 mpg_{‑imp}; 56 mpg_{‑US})
CO2 emission	63g/km	72 g/km	74 g/km	96g/km
