= Yamaha Scorpio Z =

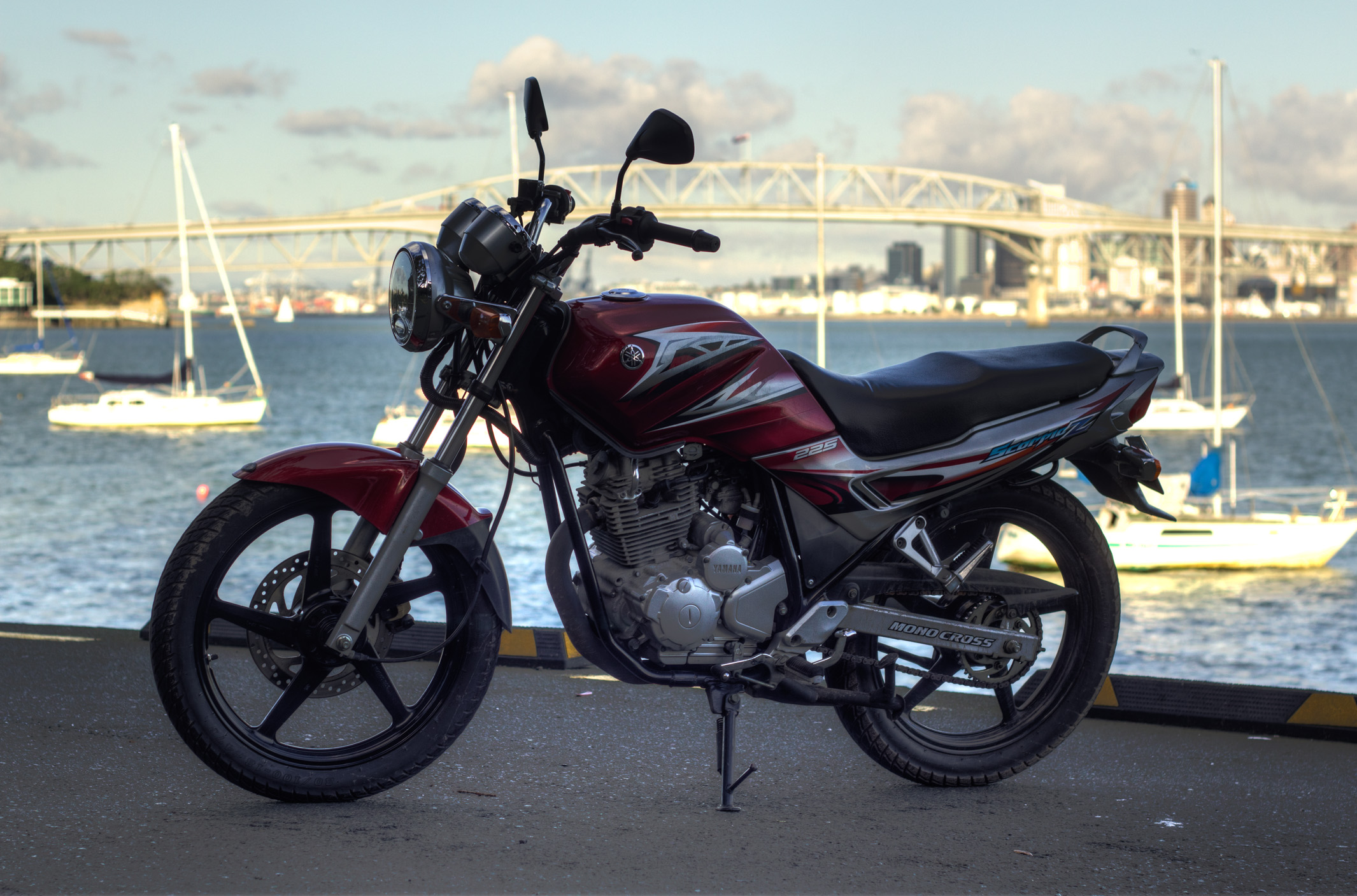
- A 2011 Yamaha Scorpio Z (non-facelift model) in Auckland, New Zealand
- Manufacturer: Yamaha Motor Company
- Also called: Yamaha Scorpio SX-4
- Class: Standard motorcycle
- Engine: 225 cc air-cooled, four-stroke, single-cylinder, single overhead camshaft with two valves
- Bore / stroke: 70.0 mm × 58.0 mm (2.76 in × 2.28 in)
- Compression ratio: 9.5:1
- Power: 13.4 kW (18.0 hp) @ 8000 rpm
- Torque: 17.5 N⋅m (12.9 lb⋅ft) @ 6500 rpm
- Ignition type: CDI
- Transmission: 5-speed
- Frame type: Steel double cradle
- Suspension: Front: Telescopic fork with 140 mm (5.5 in) of travel Rear: Swingarm with 100 mm (3.9 in) of travel
- Brakes: Front: Single disc brake Rear: Drum brake
- Tires: Front: 18 in (460 mm); Rear: 18 in (460 mm)
- Rake, trail: 85 mm (3.3 in)
- Wheelbase: 1,295 mm (51.0 in)
- Dimensions: L: 2,020 mm (80 in); 54D: 2,025 mm (79.7 in); W: 770 mm (30 in); 54D: 765 mm (30.1 in); H: 1,090 mm (43 in); 54D: 1,095 mm (43.1 in)
- Seat height: 770 mm (30 in)
- Weight: 136 kg (300 lb); 54D: 140 kg (310 lb) (wet)
- Fuel capacity: 12.0 L (2.6 imp gal) (includes 3.0 L (0.66 imp gal) reserve); 54D: 13.4 L (2.9 imp gal) (includes 2.4 L (0.53 imp gal) reserve)
- Oil capacity: 1.4 L (0.31 imp gal) (total)
- Fuel consumption: 3.2 L 100 km^{−1} (31.2 km L^{−1})
- Turning radius: 2,100 mm (83 in)

The Yamaha Scorpio Z is a commuter-orientated, standard motorcycle which was released in 2006. The Yamaha Scorpio Z underwent a facelift in 2010 and this version can be identified by the 54D model code. The original, unfacelifted version is still available in some markets and the 54D model shares the same engine, transmission, chassis, wheels, and brakes with the original version. The Yamaha Scorpio Z features a 225 cc single overhead camshaft, four-stroke, air-cooled, single cylinder engine which produces 13.4 kW of power and 17.5 Nm of torque.

The Yamaha Scorpio Z's handling and dynamics have been lauded by many reviewers, testers, and owners; especially when the price point is considered. However, the bike has also been called ugly, perhaps motivating the 2011 facelift. The Yamaha Scorpio Z has a claimed fuel consumption of 3.2 L 100 km^{−1} (31.2 km L^{−1}).
