= Yamaha IT250H =

The Yamaha IT250H was an enduro motorcycle made by Yamaha starting in 1981. It has an air-cooled single cylinder two-stroke engine with six speed gearbox. Front suspension is 32 mm telescopic forks, with rubber boots. Rear suspension is monoshock and aluminium swingarm. Brakes are single acting, half width drums at both ends. The IT was made for enduro use, although it was used with success for trail riding and motocross.
