= Yamaha TT600R =

Motorcyle model

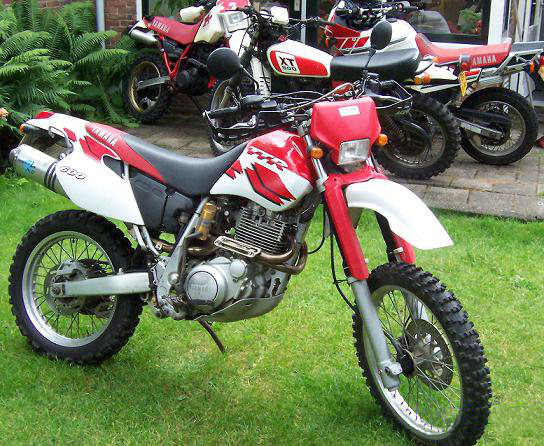
TT600R

The Yamaha TT600R is an enduro motorcycle from Yamaha Motor Company closely related to the XT series of air-cooled single cylinder engines. The TT600R model was released in 1998 to 2002, where it was replaced in 2003 by the TT600RE that was available from 2003 to 2007. It is no longer offered in its present form.

The TT600R's engine was basically a XT600 3TB engine. The TT600R had a reduced engine width by 30 mm, a lightened flywheel and crankshaft, and larger diameter Teikei YDIS carburettors and intake tracts. The 8-litre airbox with quick-release foam filter was also larger than the XT. The TT600R accelerated from 0–100 in 5,5 seconds and had a top speed of 155 km/h. The acceleration was almost a full second faster than the XT600, which was due to the lower weight and lower gearing.

The TT600R has a 42hp, single-cylinder, four-stroke engine. Its maximum torque is 50.00 Nm (5.1 kgf-m or 36.9 ft.lbs) @ 5000 RPM. It has a 5-speed gearbox.

he TT600R model was kick-start only and was further equipped with fully adjustable 46 mm Paioli conventional front forks and a Öhlins rear shock. It also came standard with Takasago aluminium alloy rims, Brembo disc brakes with steel-braided brake lines, Deltabox aluminium swingarm, Tomaselli handlebar and Domino clutch/brake mounts.

In 2003 the TT600RE model was launched with non-adjustable Yamaha suspension with shorter travel, and an electric starter instead of the TT600R kick-start only. The rims were changed from Takasago to San Remo.

The WR400F model effectively took the role of the TT600R as the serious Yamaha enduro offering.

The XT series models continued with uprated water-cooled engines to address the dual sport sector and increasingly popular motard-style street motorcycles.
