= Yamaha TY80 =

The Yamaha TY80 is a trials-styled motorcycle produced by Yamaha Motor Company from 1974 to 1984. It was part of a range that included the TY50P, TY50M, TY125, TY175 and TY250. It uses an uncommon gear configuration, with neutral in the lowest position, and then the ascending gears going upwards from there; as opposed to most modern motorcycles which feature 1st gear in the lowest position, neutral up 1 half-click and then the ascending gears going upwards.

== Specs ==
TY80A

- Capacity: 72cc
- Type: Trials
- Manufacturer: Yamaha
- Engine: 72CC two-stroke, single cylinder
- Made: 1974–1984
- Gear change: four-speed, foot change manual
- Tyres: Back: 3x14in Front: 2.5x16in
- Weight: 124 pounds (56 kg)
