= Yamaha XJ750 Maxim =

Motorcycle

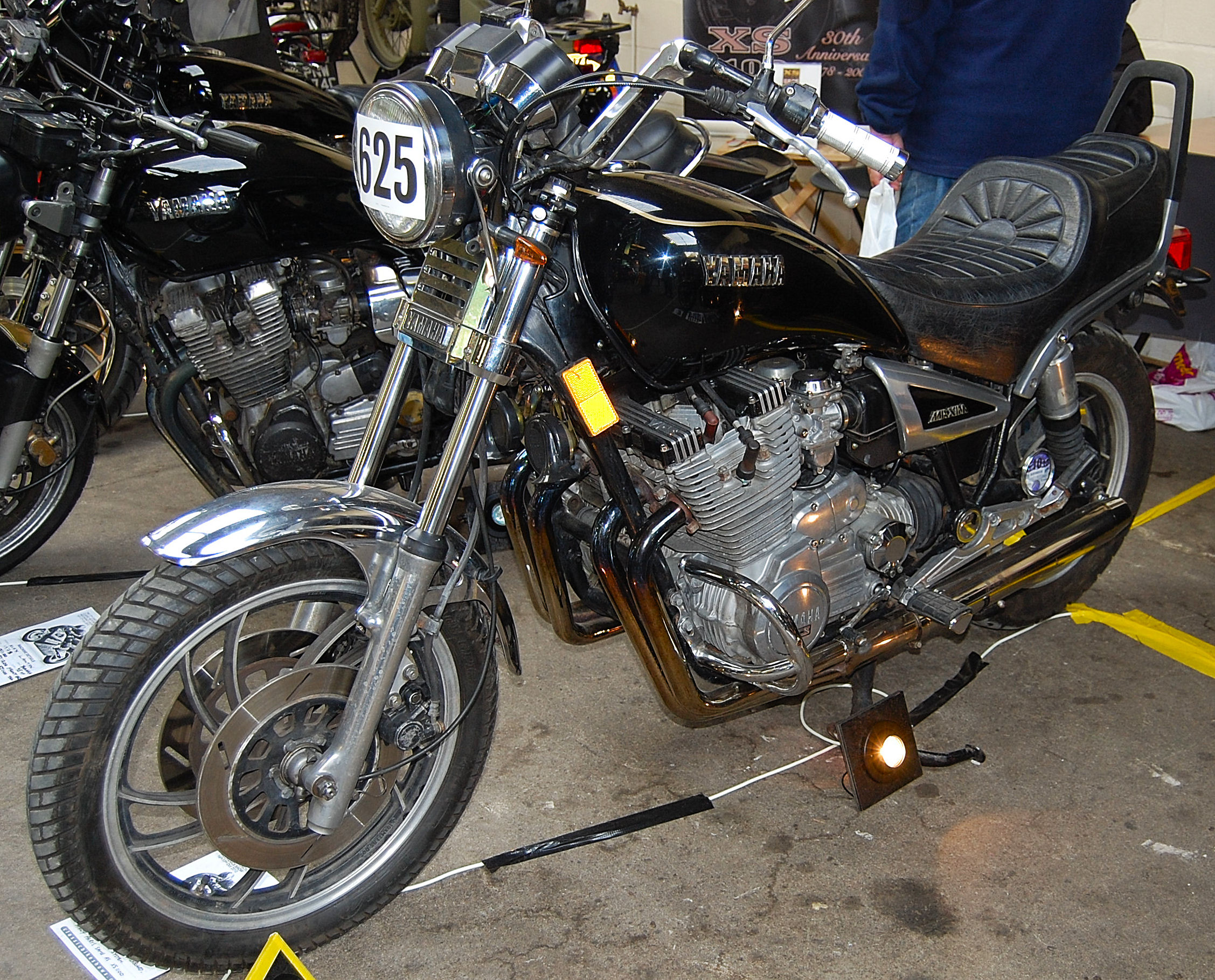
XJ750 Maxim

The Yamaha XJ750 is a motorcycle made by Yamaha Motor Company from 1982 to 1985. It has a 750 cc four-stroke, four-cylinder, air cooled, naturally aspirated dual overhead cam engine with a bore of 65 mm and stroke of 56.4 mm.

== Maxim-X ==
The Yamaha XJ750X Maxim-X is a 4-cylinder, 20-valve, liquid cooled shaft drive motorcycle released in 1985 and 1986 in Canada and other countries. The US model was identical except for a shorter stroke to reduce the size of the engine to the 700 cc maximum allowed by US Proclamation 5050 - Temporary Duty Increase all and Tariff-Rate Quota on the Importation Into the United States of Certain Heavyweight Motorcycles.
