= Yamaha XT350 =

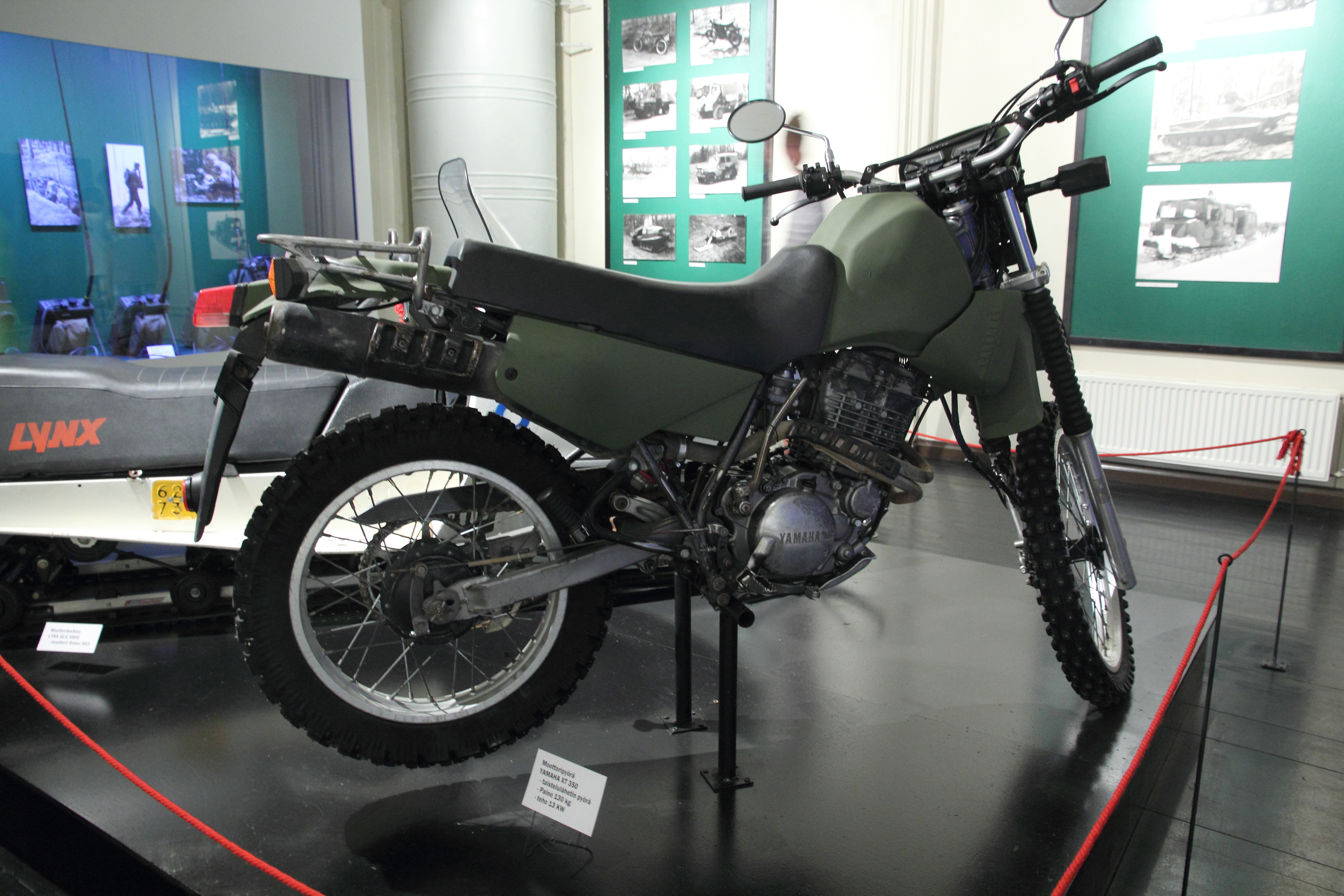
- Manufacturer: Yamaha Motor Company
- Parent company: Yamaha Corporation
- Class: Enduro
- Engine: 4-stroke 346 cc air-cooled, DOHC, single-cylinder, four valves/cyl
- Bore / stroke: 86 mm × 59.6 mm (3.39 in × 2.35 in)
- Compression ratio: 9.0:1
- Power: 27.00 HP (19.7 kW) @ 8000 RPM
- Transmission: 6-speed
- Brakes: Front brakes-Single disc Rear brakes-Expanding brake

The Yamaha XT350 is a dual-sport motorcycle produced between 1985 and 2000 by Yamaha Motor Corp.

== Features and capabilities ==
This is a 350cc four stroke enduro (motorcycle) with long travel suspension. It is street legal because it has mirrors, indicators, a horn, a headlight, a tail light and a licence plate holder.
