= Yamaha YZ125 =

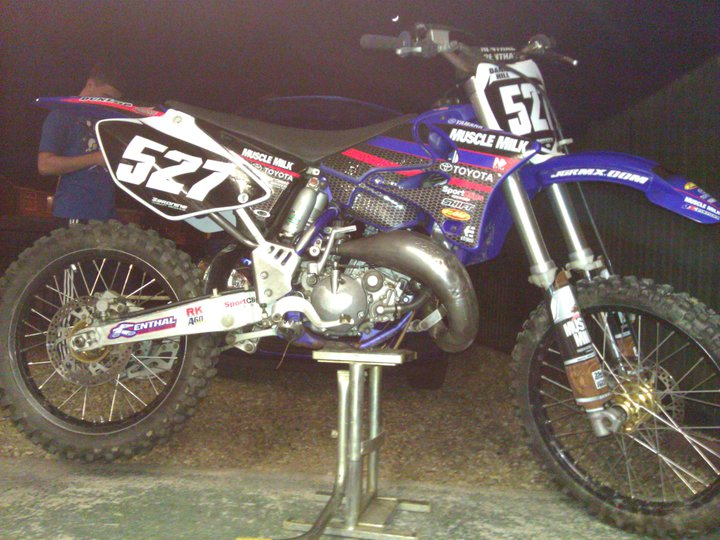
- Manufacturer: Yamaha
- Production: Since 1974
- Class: Motocross
- Engine: 124 cc (7.6 cu in) reed valve two-stroke single
- Power: 33 hp (25 kW)
- Transmission: 5- or 6-speed sequential manual
- Suspension: Mono-shock, 13 inches travel
- Brakes: Hydraulic disc
- Tires: Front: 80/100-21-51M; Rear: 100/90-19-57M
- Wheelbase: 1,440 mm (56.8 in)
- Dimensions: L: 2,140 mm (84.1 in); W: 830 mm (32.6 in); H: 1,320 mm (51.8 in)
- Seat height: 1,000 mm (39.3 in)
- Weight: 86 kg (190 lb) (dry); 94 kg (208 lb) (wet)
- Fuel capacity: 7.9 L; 1.7 imp gal (2.1 US gal)
- Related: Yamaha YZ250; Yamaha YZ85

The Yamaha YZ125 is a motocross racing motorcycle with a two-stroke 124.9 cc (7.62 cu in) displacement single-cylinder engine made by Yamaha since 1974. It is available to the public. For the first two years it was made with dual rear shocks, then changing to a monoshock. The YZ125 has been ridden to five AMA National Motocross Championships, and multiple AMA Regional Supercross Championships.

The YZ125 has a 124 cc (7.6 cu in) reed valve-inducted two-stroke engine. It was air cooled from 1974 to 1980, and liquid cooled since 1981. It has a Mikuni 38 mm TMX series carburetor. The engine produces 35 hp (26 kW).

The YZ125 has been built with five- or six-speed manual sequential gearbox depending on model year. The 2005 model has a constant-mesh, wet, multiple-disc coil-spring clutch.

== History ==
From 1973 through 2004, the YZ125 had a single backbone frame made from steel. It generally averaged from 176 to 198 lb (80 to 90 kg). For the 2005 year, Yamaha switched to a single backbone frame constructed from an aluminum alloy. This frame material change dropped the dry weight to 190 lb (86 kg). For 2008 models, the wheel assemblies and front fork suspension were redesigned, yielding additional weight savings, making wet weight, no gas sub-200 lb (91 kg).

Aluminum-framed YZ125s are notably "flickable" and sometimes this trait is seen as a drawback since they tend to become more difficult to control on rough surfaces. The YZ125 used a conventional telescopic fork tube through 1988, then in 1989, added the first upside-down fork.

A number of well known riders have chosen this as their go-to bike, such as AMA Champ Dom Barbuto and his brother Nick Barbuto, X-Games medalist Kyle Ford, StinkBike Racing's Joey Merkin, and 11-time Nationals winner Richard Rich.
