= Yamaha XTZ 250 =

Dual-sport motorcycle

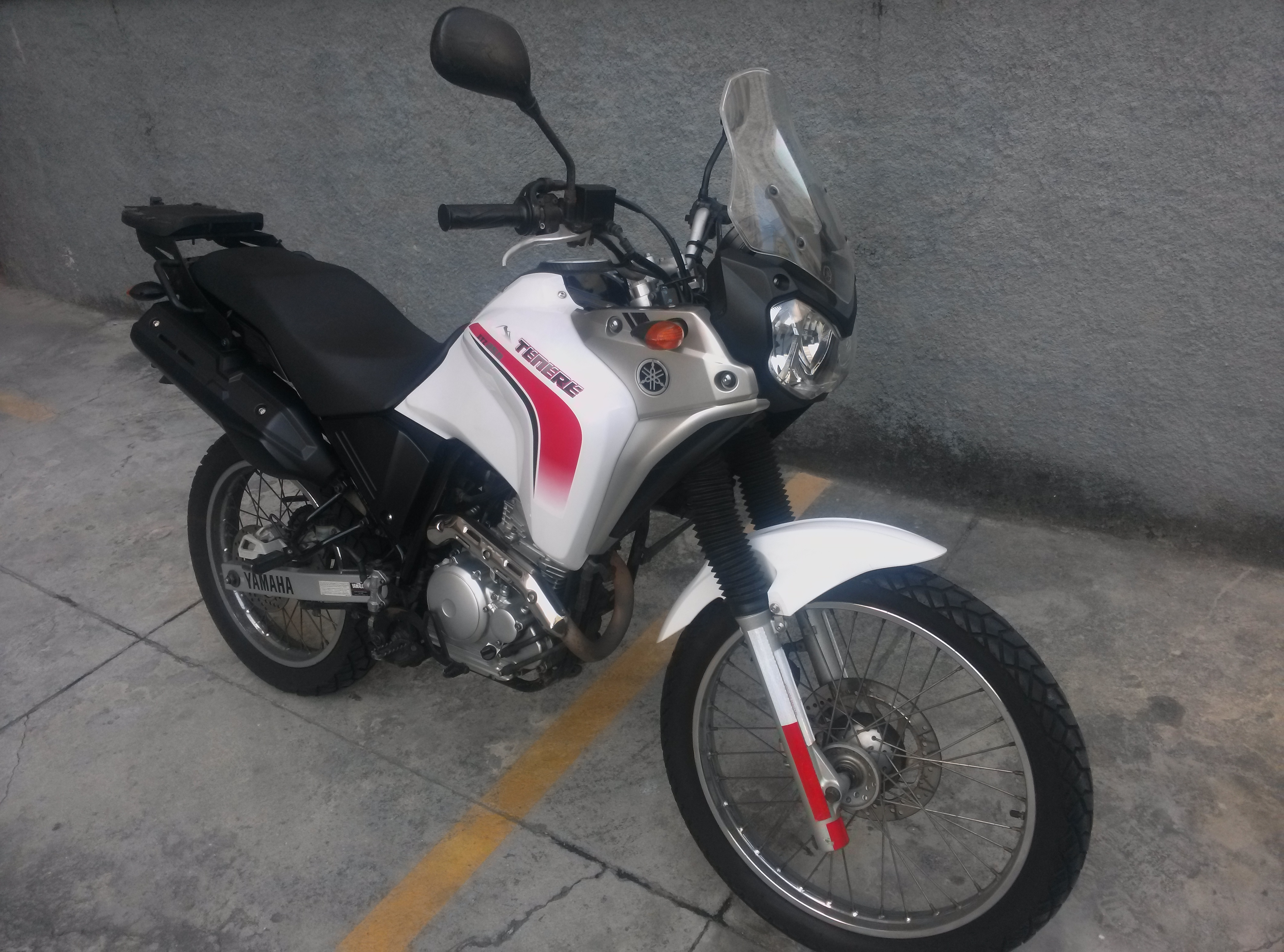
White 2011 XTZ 250 Tenere.

The Yamaha XTZ 250 is a dual-sport motorcycle designed and produced by Yamaha Motor do Brasil, starting in 2006. It is a variant of the XT250, which is marketed worldwide, and derives from the 1975 XT500 model, which established a successful range of dual-sport motorcycles, including the XT600 Ténéré, that greatly contributed to Yamaha's image. It replaces the XT225 in the Brazilian market.

Three models were introduced. The 2006 enduro-styled "Lander", the 2010 adventure-styled "Ténéré", and the short-lived 2009 motard "250 X".

The Japanese XT250 Serow is very similar, but with a 28 hp carbureted 6 speed engine, lower seat, lighter weight and rear drum brakes.

== Characteristics ==
Engine: single-cylinder SOHC 4 stroke AISAN-fuel-injection air-cooled with electric starter; the 249cc cylinder is ceramic treated.
Power: 9,80:1 compression ratio, 2,09 kgf-m at 6.500 rpm, 20.7hp at 8.000 rpm, 5 speed shift.
Brakes: Vented disks; 245mm front double-piston, 203mm rear single-piston.
Wheels: Tires come stock 80/90-21" M/C front, 120/80–18" M/C rear; some people install 90/90 front tires for better offroad stability, with compromise on asphalt.
Suspensions: 240mm front/220mm monocross rear (Lander/X); 220mm front/200mm monocross rear (Ténéré)
Dimensions: Seat height = 875mm; ground clearance = 270mm; distance between axis = 1385mm; total length = 2120mm; full weight = 151 kg (Ténéré), 146 kg (Lander).
Fuel Tank: 16L (Ténéré), 11L (Lander), 4.9L reserve (both). Internal zinc coating.
Display Panel: back-lit digital speedometer, odometer (with 2 partials and fuel reserve counter), fuel gauge and clock; analog (Ténéré)/digital (others) tachometer.

== Updates ==
In 2009, the model received new graphics, new 0² sensor and catalyzer to comply with atmospheric pollutants emission regulations.

== Models ==
=== XTZ 250 Lander ===
Introduced in 2006 to replace the XT225, it was an upgrade from the previous XT250, but now with a more aggressive offroad appearance, inspired by the WR250R, although intended for casual commuting riders - thus having lower quality components. It was available in blue & white, black & green/white/red, black & orange, orange, and dark red through its lifespan, with a limited white edition resulted from an unused surplus order by the São Paulo police force. It shares the engine and much of its parts with its street bike counterpart YS 250 Fazer.

=== XT 250Z Ténéré ===
Following the success of the 2009 Honda XRE300, Yamaha introduced the Ténéré to fill the empty market niche. Virtually the same as the Lander, it differs in its adventure approach, having a 16L tank instead of 11, with larger fairings; independent chassis-mounted headlight piece with windshield and display panel (leaving the handlebar lighter); the suspension course is a 20 mm shorter in both ends; the seat is sectioned for a more comfortable longer ride to both driver and pillion; 2 headlights, both considerably brighter than Lander's; lower handlebar position; and front fenders closer to the wheel. It was available in white, black, light blue, sand, dark blue, red and grey, with varying graphics.
Its design was heavily influenced by the Japanese/European XT 1200Z Super Ténéré.

=== XTZ 250 Lander X ===
Its motard variant, introduced 2008 and discontinued in 2010, due its price being 10% higher than the Lander. It was identical to the Lander, save for minor details. It had plastic front fork suspension protectors instead of full rubber covers, 17" front and rear wheels, thicker sport tires, taller front fender and few other design changes. The available colors were black and orange.
