= Yamaha TTR125 =

Trail bike produced from 2000

Yamaha TT-R125
- Manufacturer: Yamaha Motor Company
- Parent company: Yamaha Corporation
- Production: 2000–Present
- Predecessor: Yamaha TT-R225
- Class: Enduro
- Engine: 124 cc (7.6 cu in) 2-valve, SOHC, air-cooled, four-stroke, single
- Bore / stroke: 54 mm × 54 mm (2.1 in × 2.1 in)
- Compression ratio: 10.0:1
- Tires: F: 17 in (430 mm); R: 14 in (360 mm); L model: F: 19 in (480 mm); R: 16 in (410 mm)
- Wheelbase: 50 in (1,300 mm)
- Seat height: 30.5 in (770 mm); L model: 31.7 in (810 mm)
- Oil capacity: 1.27 US qt (1,200 ml)
- Related: Yamaha TT-R230

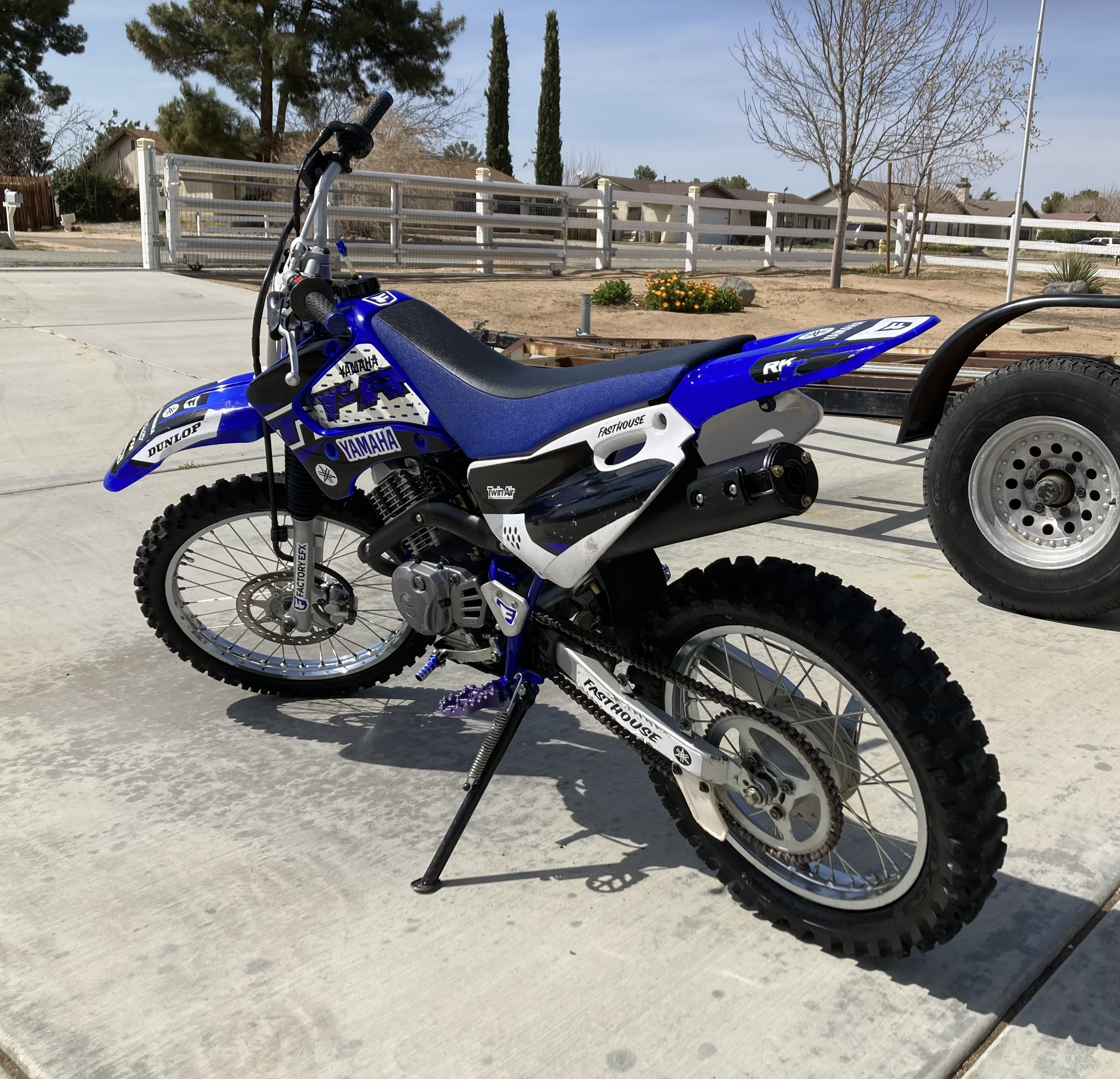
image #1

The Yamaha TT-R125 is a trail bike that Yamaha produced from 2000–present. The names TT, TT-R, and XT have been used for semi off-road and street versions in different markets and in different eras. It is mainly used for family recreation and off-road trails. It has a soft suspension, wide seat and high ground clearance.

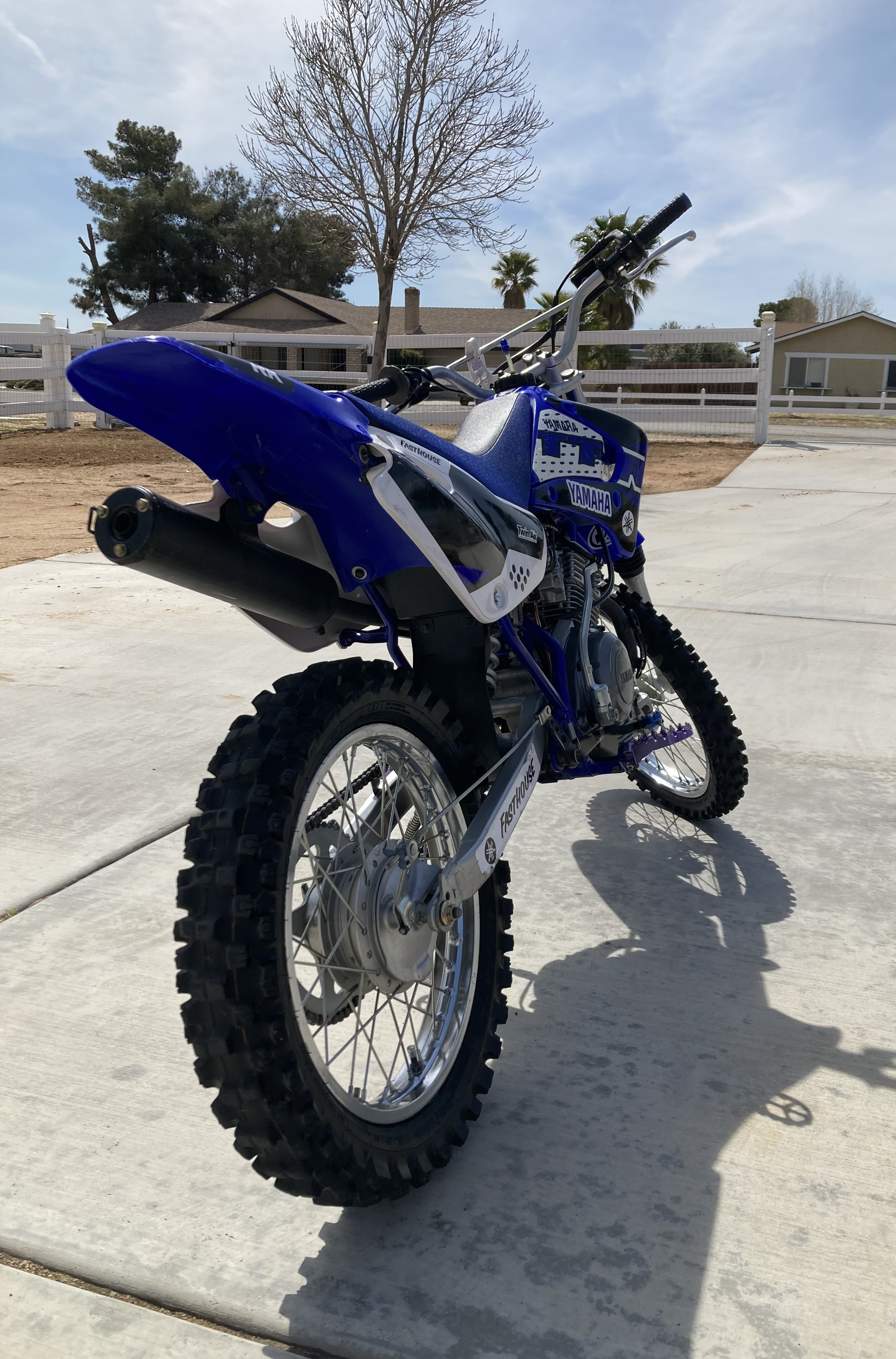
image #2

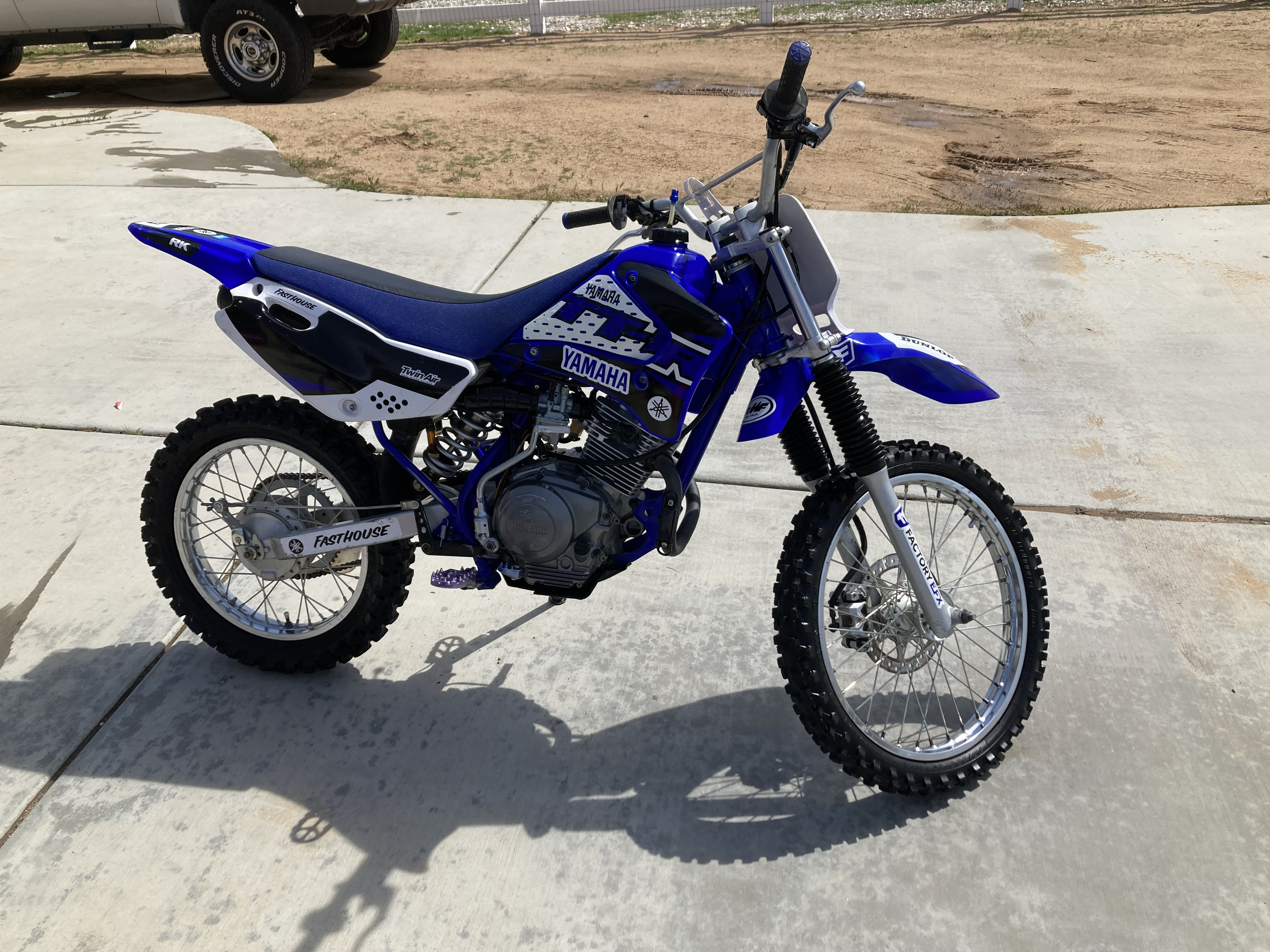
image #3

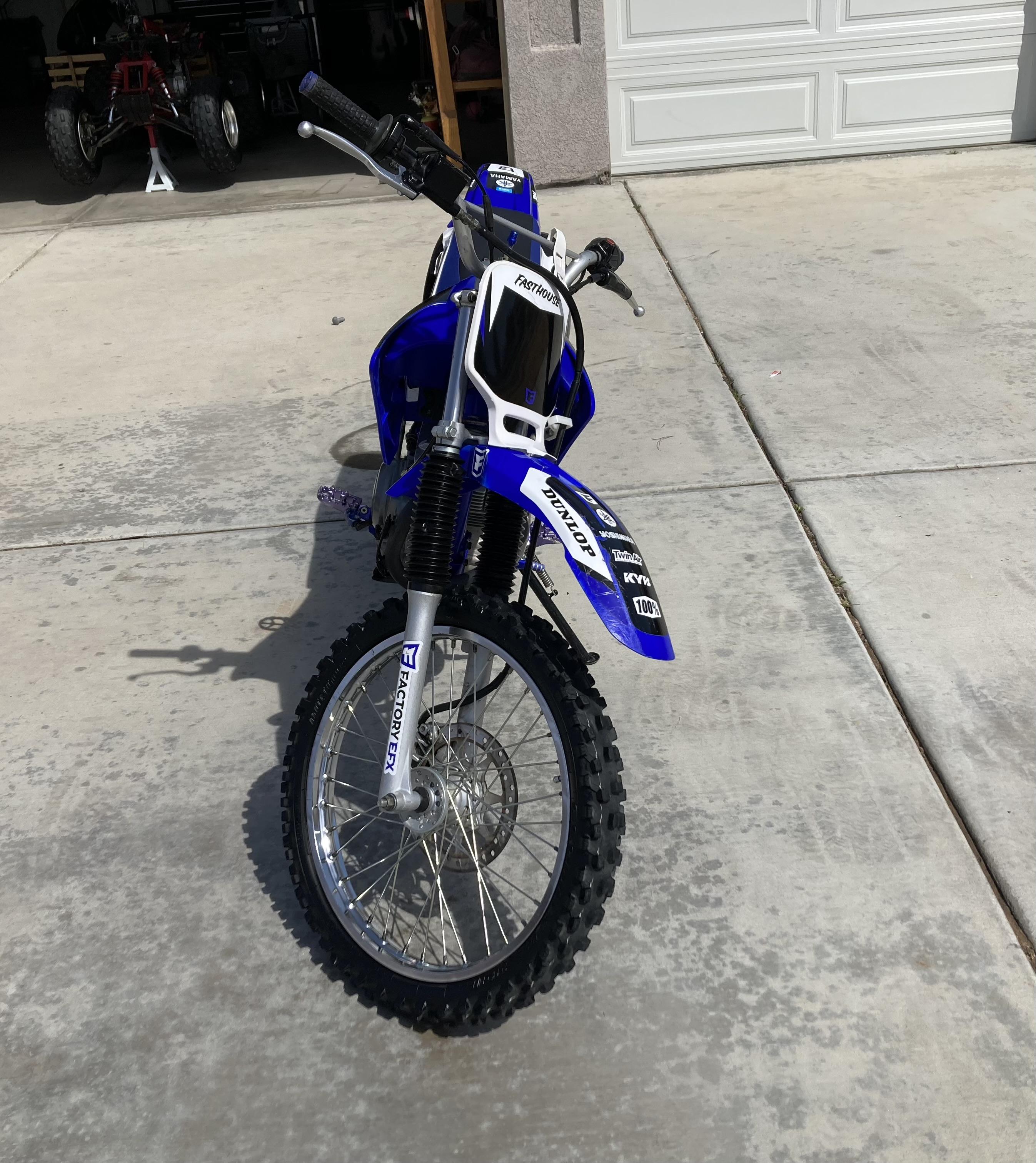
image #4

== Variants ==
The TT-R125L version has larger wheels (19 in (480 mm) and 16 in (410 mm)), with a 31.7 in (810 mm) seat height, and a front disc brake. Introduced in 2003, the TT-R125E has electric start.

The TT-R125LE combines both features of the L and E variants.

== See also ==
- Yamaha TT-R225
- Yamaha TT-R230
- Yamaha TT-R250
- Yamaha XT225
