= Raid De Himalaya =

Raid de Himalaya was a rally raid first held in 1999. Its last edition was in 2018. It is the world's highest rally raid. The 2009 event ran in six legs from Shimla to Srinagar, between 5 October and 13 October.

== Himalayan Motorsport Association ==
The Himalayan Motorsport Association was formed in 1999 with the aim of conducting motorsporting events in the Himalayan regions of Himachal Pradesh, Jammu and Kashmir and Uttarakhand.

The association is registered as a society under the Registrar of Societies Act 1814 at Shimla where the association has its registered office.

HMA is a non - profit society that donates its surplus income for worthy causes. In 2012, Himalayan Motorsport donated Rs. 10 lakhs to the Deputy Commissioner Leh towards relief work conducted for the victims of the cloudburst that struck Ladakh. HMA also supports Umang, a society in Jaipur that is involved with educating children with special needs. As part of its social responsibility program, HMA organizes rallies for 'blind navigators' in Delhi and Rajasthan.

All members of HMA have been associated with motorsport for the last 20 to 30 years as rally drivers or organizers, across the country. Many are qualified Scrutineers and Stewards who have current Scrutineer and Steward licenses from the FMSCI.

The Himalayan Motorsport Association is a Council Member Club of the Federation of Motorsports Clubs of India (FMSCI), Chennai. About 500 clubs are members of the Federation of which eight are appointed as Council Members.

HMA is the first Indian Club (in 2001) to have its event - the Raid de Himalaya - inscribed on the International Off Road Rallies Calendar with the FIA (Paris) and the FIM (Geneva). There are 12 such events worldwide and the Raid de Himalaya is one of them.

Internationally reputed to be the "highest motorsport event in the world", the Raid de Himalaya was created by HMA and has been organized and conducted by the club for the past 15 years consecutively.

Other events run by HMA include the Dhorra Kross (Desert 4 x 4 training in Rajasthan) and the Ice Kross (Snow and Ice 4 x 4 training in Himachal/ Kashmir). Both these events are organized annually and showcase HMA's expertise in the field of cross country driving.

4x4 XTREME Winners
Year	Driver	Vehicle
1999	Sanjay Sikand	Maruti Gypsy
2000	Abhilash P G	Maruti Esteem
2001	Along Aier	Maruti Gypsy
2002	Lima Jamir	Maruti Gypsy
2003	Mosem Jamir	Maruti Gypsy
2004	Suresh Rana	Maruti Gypsy
2005	Suresh Rana	Maruti Gypsy
2006	Suresh Rana	Maruti Gypsy
2007	Suresh Rana	Maruti Gypsy
2008	Suresh Rana	Maruti Gypsy
2009	Amarindar Brar	Maruti Gypsy
2010	Suresh Rana	Maruti Gypsy
2011	Suresh Rana	Maruti Gypsy
2012	Suresh Rana	Maruti Gypsy
2013	Suresh Rana	Maruti Gypsy
2014	Amartej Ps Puwal	Maruti Gypsy
2015	Tsering Lhakpa	Maruti Gypsy
2016	Suresh Rana	Grand Vitara
2017	Suresh Rana	Grand Vitara
2018	Arindam Saikia	Polaris

MOTO-QUAD Winners
Year	Rider	Motorcycle
1999	Suhrid Sharma	Suzuki Supra
2000	Amarinder Sandhu	Suzuki Shaolin
2001	Suhrid Sharma	Suzuki Supra
2002	Suhrid Sharma	Suzuki Shogun
2003	Sukhjinder Rana	TVS Fiero
2004	Suresh Rana	TVS Fiero
2005	Ashish Saurabh Moudghil	Hero Honda CBZ
2006	Damon IAnson	Yamaha XT 600
2007	Ashish Saurabh Moudghil	Hero Honda Karizma R
2008	Ashish Saurabh Moudghil	Hero Honda Karizma R
2009	Ashish Saurabh Moudghil	Yamaha WR250F
2010	Ashish Saurabh Moudghil	Yamaha WR450F
2011	Helly Frauwallner	Yamaha WR450F
2012	CS Santosh	Honda CRF450X
2013	Helly Frauwallner	Yamaha WR450F
2014	Natraj R	TVS Sherco RTR 450
2015	KP Aravind	TVS Sherco RTR 450
2016	Abdul Wahid Tanveer	TVS Sherco RTR 450
2017	Abdul Wahid Tanveer	TVS Sherco RTR 450
2018	Natraj R	TVS Sherco RTR 450
