= Yamaha TTR250 =

Yamaha TT-R250
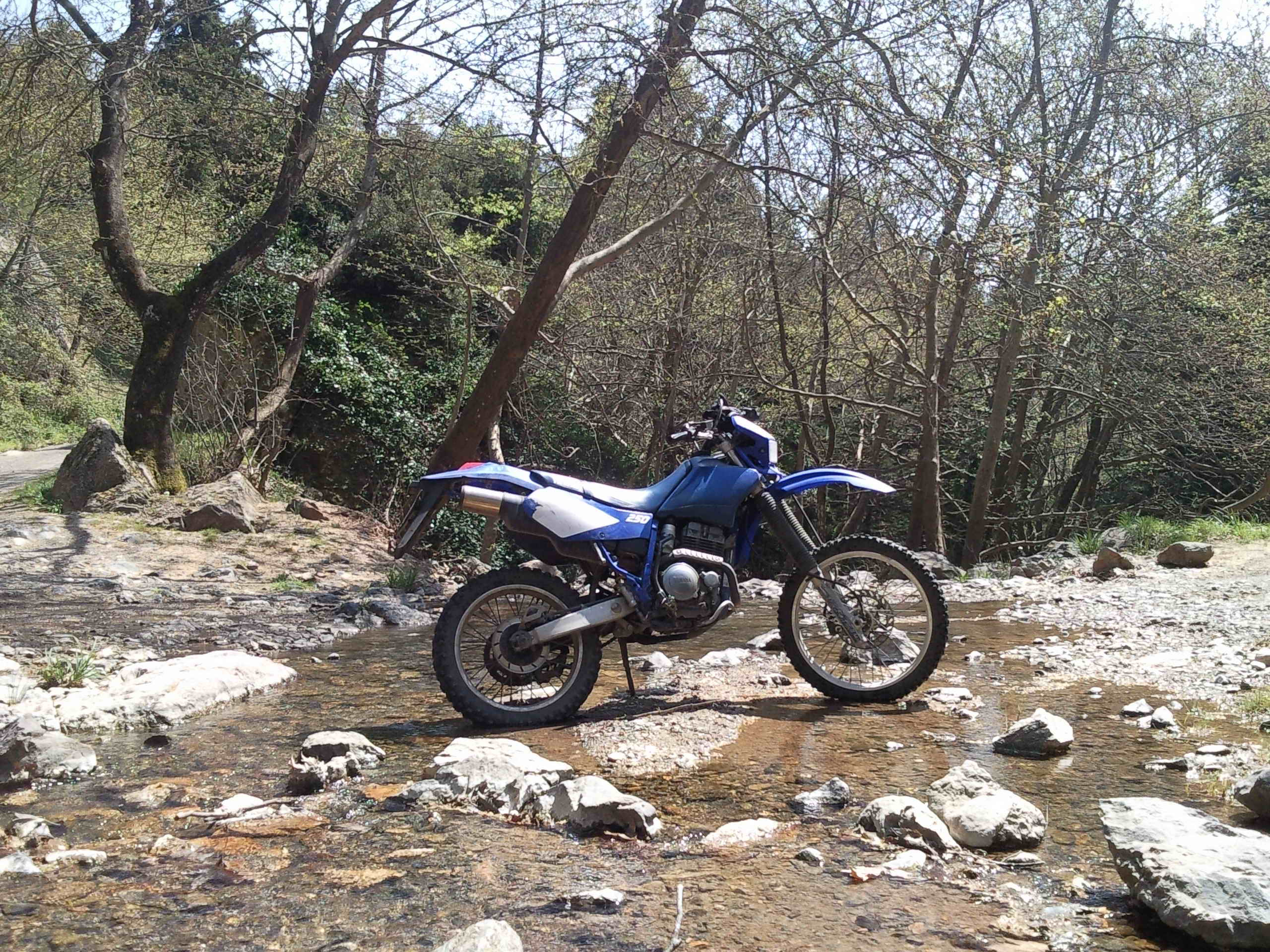
- Manufacturer: Yamaha Motor Company
- Parent company: Yamaha Corporation
- Production: 1993-2006
- Predecessor: TT250
- Successor: Yamaha WR250F
- Class: Off-road, Enduro
- Engine: 249cc single-cylinder, DOHC air-cooled, four-stroke engine. 73 mm (2.9 in) bore x 60 mm (2.4 in) stroke, 10.20:1 compression ratio
- Power: 25 hp
- Transmission: Constant mesh, 6 speed
- Frame type: Steel, semi-double cradle
- Suspension: Front: Telescopic fork, 11.02 in (280 mm) travel Rear: Coil-spring/gas-oil damper shock absorber, 11.02 in (280 mm) travel
- Tires: Front: 80/100-21 51M; Rear: 100/100-18 59M
- Rake, trail: 26°, 4.25 in (108 mm)
- Wheelbase: 55.3 in (1,400 mm)
- Dimensions: L: 82.5 in (2,100 mm); W: 32.9 in (840 mm); H: 49.6 in (1,260 mm)
- Seat height: 36 in (910 mm)
- Weight: 249 lb (113 kg) (dry); 273 lb (124 kg) (wet)
- Fuel capacity: 2.51 US gal (9.5 L; 2.09 imp gal)
- Turning radius: 86.6 in (2,200 mm)
- Related: Yamaha TT-R225, Yamaha XT225

The Yamaha TT-R250 is an entry-level trail bike that Yamaha produced from 1993 to 2006 to compete with the Honda XR250R. The TT-R250 was equipped with electric start, and was designed to be reliable and long-lived.

== See also ==
- Yamaha XT225
- Yamaha TT-R230
