= Yamaha TTR230 =

Yamaha TT-R230
- Manufacturer: Yamaha Motor Company
- Parent company: Yamaha Corporation
- Production: 2005–Present
- Assembly: Manaus, Brazil
- Predecessor: Yamaha TT-R225
- Class: Enduro
- Engine: 223 cc (13.6 cu in) 2-valve, SOHC, air-cooled, four-stroke, single
- Bore / stroke: 70 mm × 58 mm (2.8 in × 2.3 in)
- Compression ratio: 9.50:1
- Power: 17 hp
- Transmission: Constant mesh 6-speed, wet, multiple-disc clutch, chain drive
- Suspension: Front: 36 mm (1.4 in) telescopic fork 240 mm (9.4 in) travel Rear: Coil-gas spring/oil damper, 220 mm (8.7 in) travel
- Brakes: Front: 220 mm (8.7 in) Hydraulic single disc Rear: drum
- Tires: F: 21 in (530 mm); R: 18 in (460 mm)
- Rake, trail: 27°. 111 mm (4.4 in)
- Wheelbase: 1,385 mm (54.5 in)
- Dimensions: L: 2,065 mm (81.3 in); W: 800 mm (31 in); H: 1,180 mm (46 in)
- Seat height: 870 mm (34 in)
- Weight: 109.8 kg (242 lb) (dry); 116 kg (256 lb) (wet)
- Fuel capacity: 8 L (1.8 imp gal; 2.1 US gal)
- Oil capacity: 1.1 L (0.24 imp gal; 0.29 US gal)
- Related: Yamaha TT-R125

The Yamaha TT-R230 is a trail bike that Yamaha produced from 2005–present. The TT-R230 is Yamaha's successor to the TT-R225. The names TT, TT-R, and XT have been used for semi off-road and street versions in different markets and in different eras. The TT-R230 is a mid-range dirt bike for beginner to intermediate riders, kids or teen. It is mainly used for family recreation and off-road trails. It has a soft suspension, wide seat and high ground clearance.

== See also ==
- Yamaha TT-R125
- Yamaha TT-R225
- Yamaha TT-R250
- Yamaha XT225
