= Yamaha YZ450FX =

- Manufacturer: Yamaha Motor Company
- Parent company: Yamaha Corporation
- Production: Since 2016
- Class: Enduro
- Engine: Single-cylinder, DOHC, Multivalve, water-cooled, four-stroke
- Transmission: 5-speed, wet clutch, chain drive
- Suspension: Front: Kayaba inverted fork; fully adjustable Rear: single shock; fully adjustable
- Brakes: Hydraulic single disc brakes
- Tires: Front: 21 in (530 mm); Rear:18 in (460 mm)

The Yamaha YZ450FX is an off-road performance motorcycle made by Yamaha Motor Company. It currently has a 450 cc (27 cu in) liquid-cooled single-cylinder engine. First offered in 2016 at 450cc, it shared many components and design concepts with both the Yamaha WR450F and Yamaha YZ450F motocross model. The 2016 model premiered as a closed-course, competition GNCC/Woods racer. The YZ450FX features a wide ratio transmission, 18" wheel, electric start and kickstand.

== First Generation (2016) ==
The YZ450FX was introduced in 2016 and the first generation continued through 2018. The frame is the same as the YZ450F of that year but with different engine mount brackets.

== Second Generation (2019) ==
The second generation YZ450FX was introduced in 2019 and featured an all new engine, updated suspension settings, revised chassis, and a wireless, smartphone based engine tuning app. The kickstarter was removed for this generation and cannot be added.

== Third Generation (2021) ==
Third Generation YZ450FX
- Manufacturer: Yamaha
- Production: 2019-2020
- Engine: Titanium 4-value, 450 cc, 97mmx 60.9mm, compression ratio 12.8:1
- Transmission: Constant mesh, 5 speed
- Frame type: Semi double cradle, aluminum
- Suspension: Front: KYB SSS cartridge forks, 12.2 in (310 mm) travel Rear: 12.5 in (318 mm) travel
- Brakes: Front: Hydraulic single disc, 270mm Rear: Hydraulic single disc, 245mm
- Tires: Front: 80/100-21 51M; Rear: 120/100-18 65M
- Rake, trail: 27.2°, 116 mm (4.6 in)
- Wheelbase: 1,480 mm (58 in)
- Dimensions: L: 2,175 mm (85.6 in); W: 825 mm (32.5 in); H: 1,270 mm (50 in)
- Seat height: 955 mm (37.6 in)
- Weight: 116 kg (256 lb) (wet)
- Fuel capacity: 2.2 US gal (8.3 L; 1.8 imp gal)

The third generation YZ450FX was introduced in 2021 and featured a lighter cylinder head, new camshafts and piston, and a longer connecting rod. It shares the same chassis as the YZ450F.

== See also ==
- Yamaha WR450F
- Yamaha YZ450F
