= Yamaha WR250R =

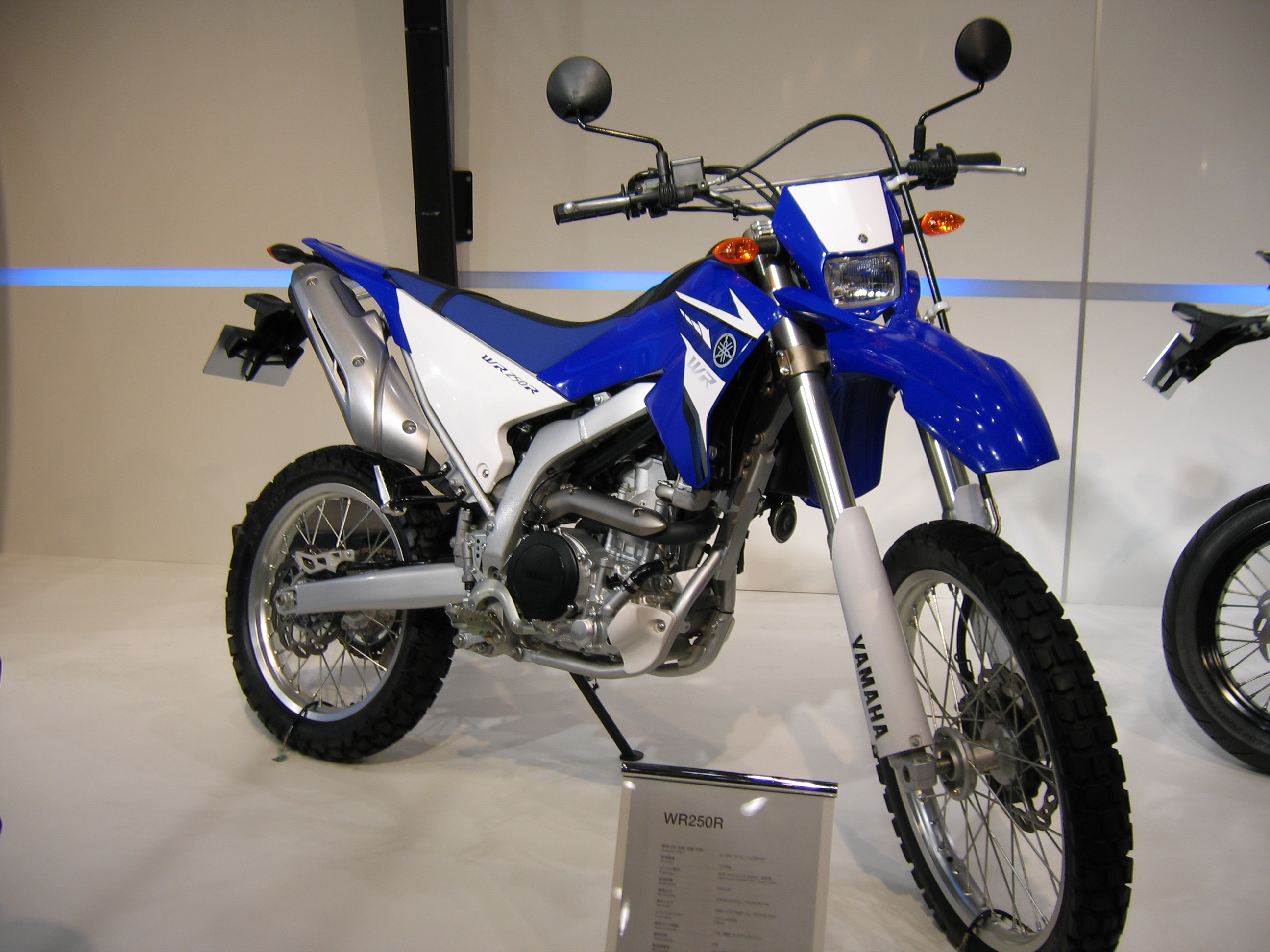
- Manufacturer: Yamaha Motor Company
- Class: Dual-sport motorcycle
- Engine: 250 cc (15 cu in) Single-cylinder; four-stroke
- Bore / stroke: 77.0 mm × 53.6 mm (3.03 in × 2.11 in)
- Compression ratio: 11.8:1
- Top speed: 87 MPH (140km/h)
- Power: 29.5 HP at the crank
- Ignition type: TCI
- Transmission: 6-speed
- Suspension: 10.6 Inches (280mm) front&rear
- Wheelbase: 55.9 Inches (1420mm)
- Seat height: 36.6 in (930 mm)
- Weight: 295 lb (134 kg) (wet)
- Fuel capacity: 2.0 US gal (7.6 L; 1.7 imp gal)
- Related: Yamaha WR450F; Yamaha WR250F; Yamaha WR125

The Yamaha WR250R was a dual-sport motorcycle made by Yamaha Motor Company. It has a 250cc (15 cu in) liquid-cooled single-cylinder four-stroke DOHC engine, fed premium fuel by electronic fuel injection. It remained largely unchanged since its introduction in 2008, with most differences being cosmetic. Its sister model is the WR250X, the supermoto build with a more street oriented set of tires and sprockets. The WR in both names indicates a wide-ratio gear box designed to offer good low-speed responsiveness in off-road situations while still being able to achieve freeway speeds. Yamaha announced the discontinuation of the WR250R in its 2021 lineup press release in 2020, making 2020 the last production year for the WR250R.

Despite the similar name, it shares very few common components with the lighter, non-street-legal off-road competition WR250F.

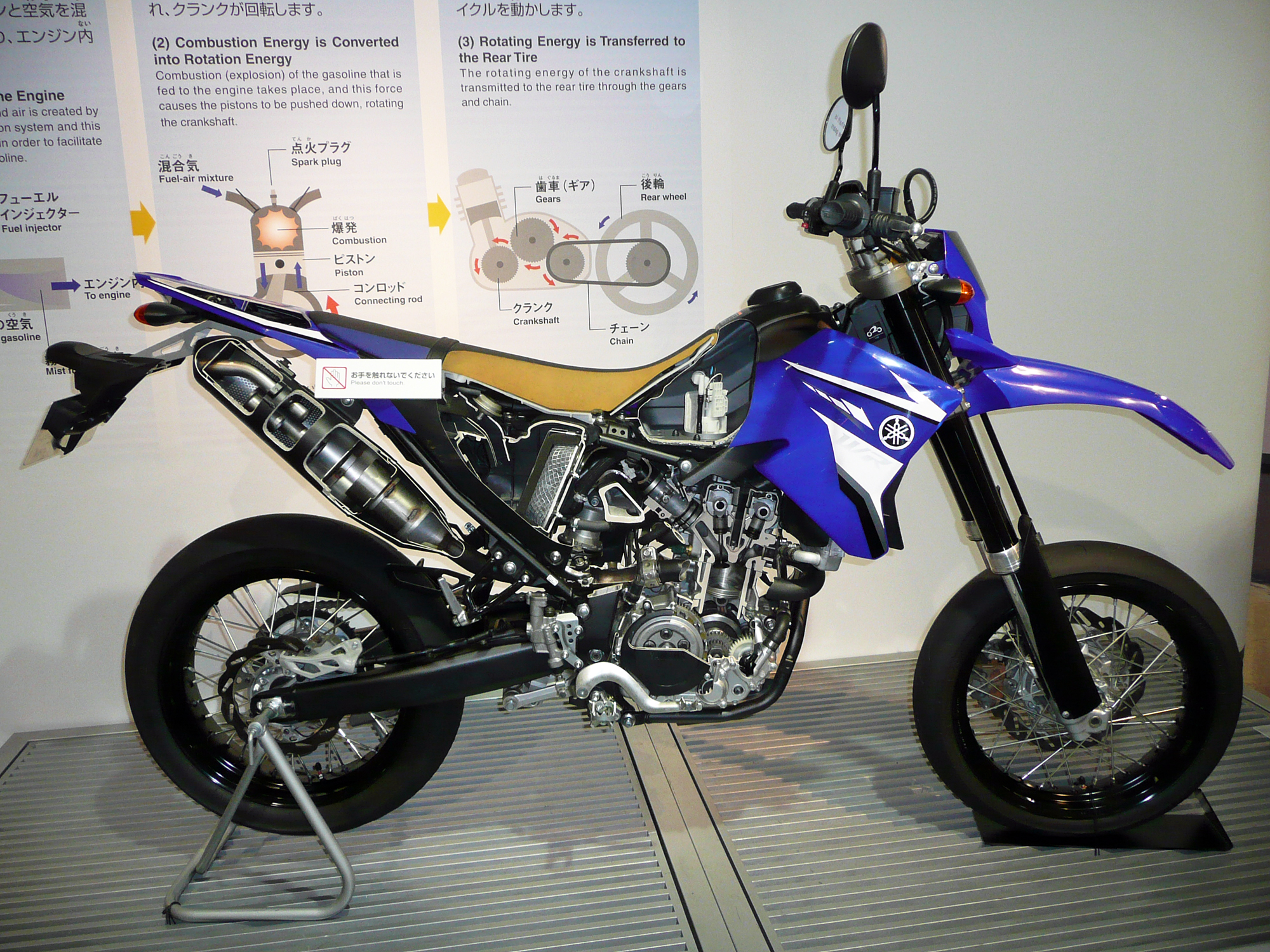
Cut Model in the Yamaha Communication Plaza
