= Yamaha YZ450F =

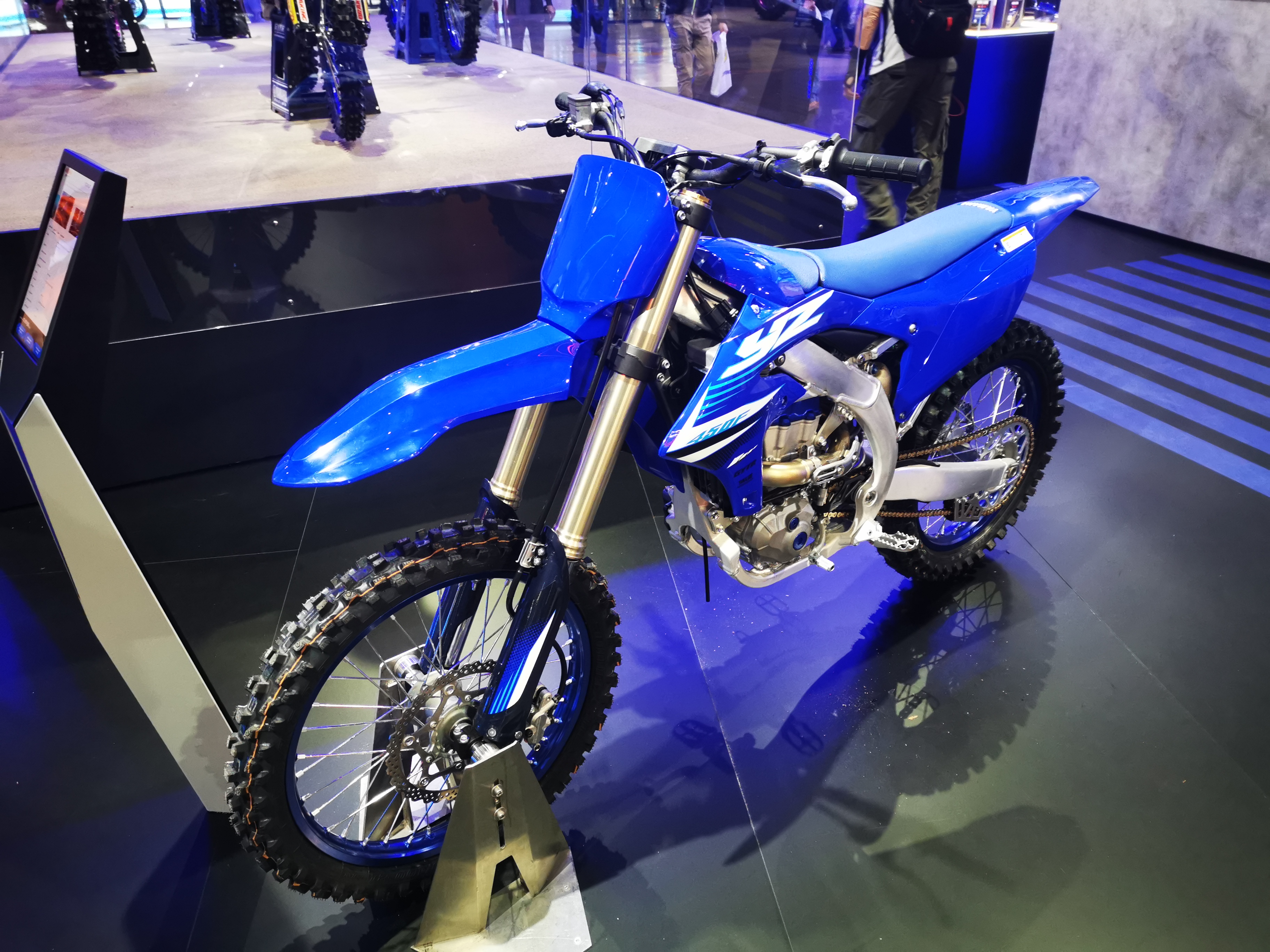
- 2024 Yamaha YZ450F
- Manufacturer: Yamaha Motor Company
- Predecessor: Yamaha YZ250
- Class: Motocross
- Engine: DOHC, multivalve, water-cooled, four-stroke, single
- Related: Yamaha YZ450FX; Yamaha YZ250F

The Yamaha YZ450F is a four-stroke racing motocross bike built by Yamaha Motor Corporation. It was the successor to the previous YZ426F which was discontinued in 2003. It is credited by Cycle World and Dirt Rider magazines as the bike that started the four-stroke dirt bike revolution.

The 2006 YZ250F and YZ450F were the first production motorcycles equipped with titanium suspension springs.

The WR450F is the enduro version of the YZ450F.

== Introduction ==
For many years, the motocross world almost exclusively used two-stroke engines. AMA racing classes had three classes: 125 cc, 250 cc, and 500 cc with no provision for four strokes. Later on in 1993, The AMA rules had changed where the gigantic 500cc liquid-cooled engines were no longer able to race. Most riders considered four-stroke engine technology to be largely utilitarian and uncompetitive, relegated solely for trail riding.

In 1996, the AMA introduced a displacement exemption for one season allowing any displacement four stroke to compete in the same racing class as 250 cc two-strokes. Yamaha engineer Yoshiharu Nakayama first came up with the idea of creating the first competitive four-stroke race motocross bike. The Yamaha YZ400F was developed to fit into this category. It solved the power dilemma by borrowing superbike technology and giving the YZ a five-valve head, liquid cooling and a 12.5-1 compression ratio.

In 1997, Yamaha rocked the motocross world with the introduction of the YZ400M prototype, a concept motorcycle which borrowed much technology from road racing. The YZM was far ahead of all competition among four-stroke motocross bikes. Doug Henry piloted the YZ400M to its first victory in 1997 at the Las Vegas Supercross. This was the first time any four-stroke had won an AMA event. The YZ400M was the predecessor of the production YZ400F, which was released the next year.

== First generation YZ400F: 1998–1999 ==
First Generation YZ400F
- Production: 1998–1999
- Predecessor: Yamaha YZ250
- Successor: YZ426F
- Engine: Five-valve, 400 cc
- Compression ratio: 12.5:1
- Transmission: 5-speed
- Weight: 250 lb (110 kg) (dry)

Yamaha introduced the YZ400F in production in 1998 after a successful AMA season in 1997. It was "the first modern production four-stroke motocrosser that was directly competitive against two-strokes." Initially, Yamaha targeted a dry weight of 233 pounds (106 kg) (on par with the 250 two-strokes of the time), but by production, the bike weighed 250 pounds. The bike had an 11,600 rpm redline power and torque close to its 250 cc two-stroke rivals. It benefited from engine compression braking, which allowed the engine to slow the bike down during deceleration, giving the brakes a rest. The 1998 YZ400F was the first bike to come stock with a Keihin FCR carburetor.

In 1998, Doug Henry won the AMA National Motocross Championship aboard the YZF, becoming the first rider to win a championship on a four-stroke motorcycle. This victory is considered by some to be the major turning point in the motocross world—for the first time, four strokes were considered a competitive racing machine.

== Second generation YZ426F: 2000–2002 ==
Second generation YZ426F
- Production: 2000–2003
- Predecessor: YZ400F
- Successor: YZ450F
- Engine: Titanium five-valve, 426 cc
- Bore / stroke: 95 mm x 60.1 mm
- Compression ratio: 12.5:1
- Transmission: 5-speed
- Suspension: Kayaba
- Brakes: Disc
- Tires: F: 21 in, R: 19 in
- Wheelbase: 58.7 in
- Seat height: 39.3 in
- Fuel capacity: 2.1 gallons (7.95 L)

In 2000, Yamaha updated the YZ400F, increasing the displacement to 426 cc for greater power and throttle response. In addition, the carburetor and jets were updated to ease the YZ400F's starting woes.

The next year, in 2001, Yamaha replaced the previous steel valves with titanium ones. The new valves were more than forty percent lighter than the previous valves, allowing for lighter and softer valve springs, in turn allowing a quicker revving engine, improved throttle response, higher rev ceilings, and more power. The crankshaft was also reshaped and the whole assembly was redesigned for quicker throttle response and, Yamaha claimed, "less high-end horsepower loss." In addition to motor modifications, a few changes were made to the transmission to help contain the power and ensure longevity. The suspension also received a bit of an overhaul with the goal being reduced weight and smoother action throughout the stroke. Yamaha also designed a new exhaust pipe design so that exhaust header removal would no longer be required when replacing the oil filter. Carburetor tuning was modified to deal with starting and off-idle take off difficulties.

Also in 2001 the subframe was changed from a steel to a blue painted aluminum style. In 2002 the blue painting was stopped and left to a bare aluminum look. Motorcycle.com says that "The gas tank is reasonably thin and allows good forward and backward movement while providing something nicely shaped to hold onto with your knees. In fact, the entire ergonomic package on this YZF is well thought out. The handlebars have a nice bend to them and are well-placed for good rider control and legroom. The foot pegs are well-made units with a wide platform and sit in a position that keeps them from dragging in ruts without cramping a rider's legs."

In 2002 Yamaha remapped the digital CD ignition system which delivers a more precise spark and optimal timing for faster, stronger response during hard acceleration, and less kickback during starting. Also an all-new swing-arm which is lighter and stronger for reduced weight, greater rigidity and more compliant rear suspension action. While an anodized finish gives the bike a tricked out look. The 426 also includes a larger pivot shift for increased durability. A larger rear brake disc was also added which means greater stopping power.

== Third generation YZ450F: 2003–2005 ==
Third Generation YZ450F
- Production: 2003–2005
- Predecessor: YZ426F
- Engine: Titanium five-valve, 449 cc
- Bore / stroke: 95.0 mm x 63.4 mm
- Compression ratio: 12.3:1
- Transmission: 2003–2004: 4-speed 2005: 5-speed
- Frame type: Steel

For 2003, the YZF received the biggest update in its history. First, the engine displacement was increased with 449 cc in compliance to the new AMA Motocross maximum displacement rule, the engine now produced over 52 hp (39 kW). Next, the frame and plastic were updated for a new, sleeker look. Additionally, the YZF's weight was decreased from its original 250 lb (110 kg) to 233 lb (106 kg). The bike made tremendous power; however, many thought that the bike had too much power for a motocross track.

The 2005 YZ450F was the first YZ450F to feature KYB twin chamber cartridge forks.

== Fourth generation YZ450F: 2006–2009 ==
Fourth Generation YZ450F
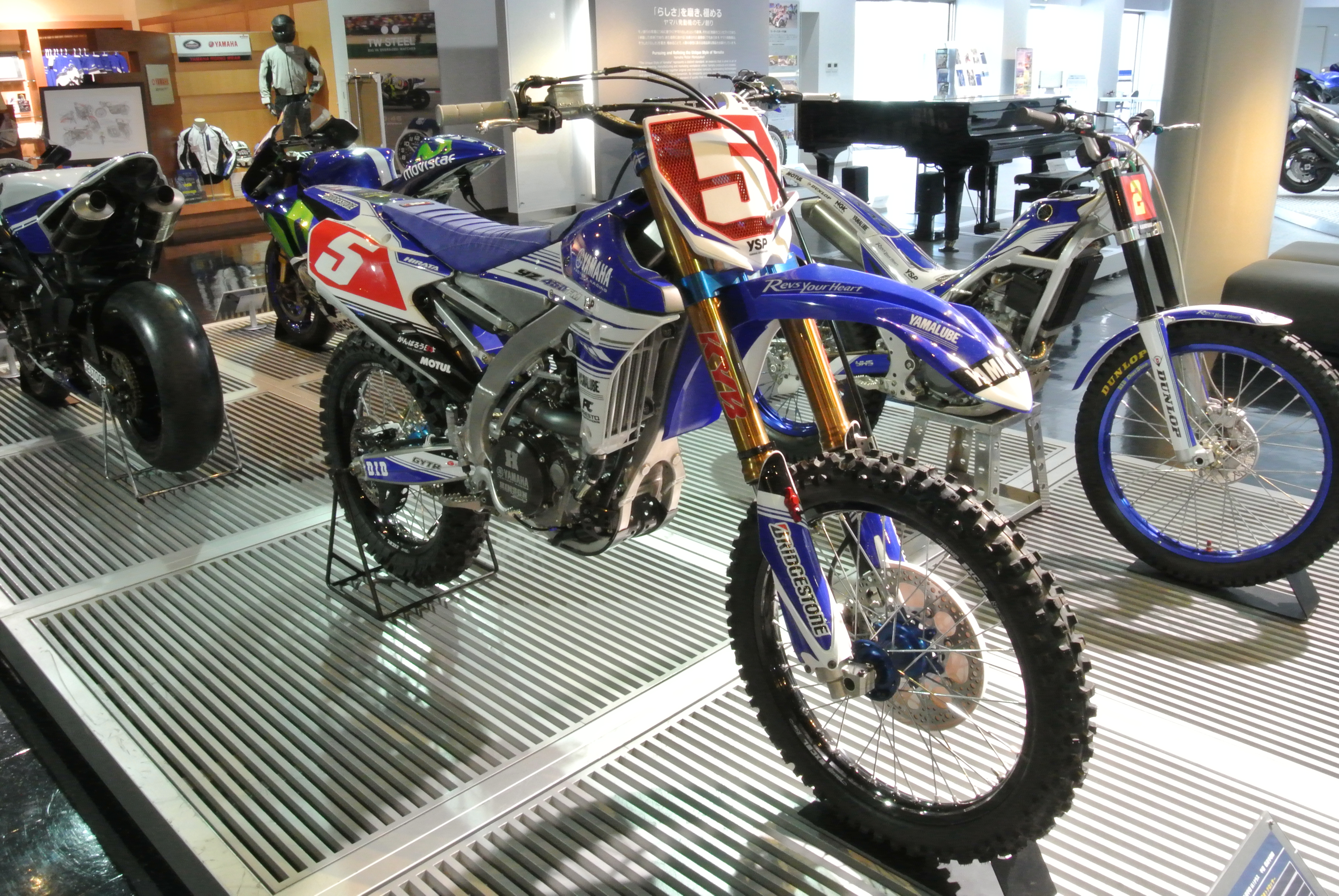
- Production: 2006–2009
- Predecessor: YZ450F
- Engine: Titanium five-valve, 449 cc
- Bore / stroke: 95.0 mm x 63.4 mm
- Compression ratio: 12.3:1
- Transmission: 5-speed
- Frame type: Aluminum
- Fuel capacity: 1.9 gal

The YZ450F received a major update in 2006, with over 300 parts changed and improved. The power was smoothed out, and the bike was made easier to ride, putting to rest the complaint that the YZ had too much power. The transmission was returned to a more traditional five-speed. An all-new aluminum single backbone frame shaved another 10 pounds off the weight.

The 2006 model received KYB SSS forks.

2007 saw camshaft and exhaust changes, moving peak power from the low to the middle band. Revisions in 2008-2009 furthered the push of powerband towards the mid-range.

== Fifth generation YZ450F: 2010–2013 ==
Fifth Generation YZ450F
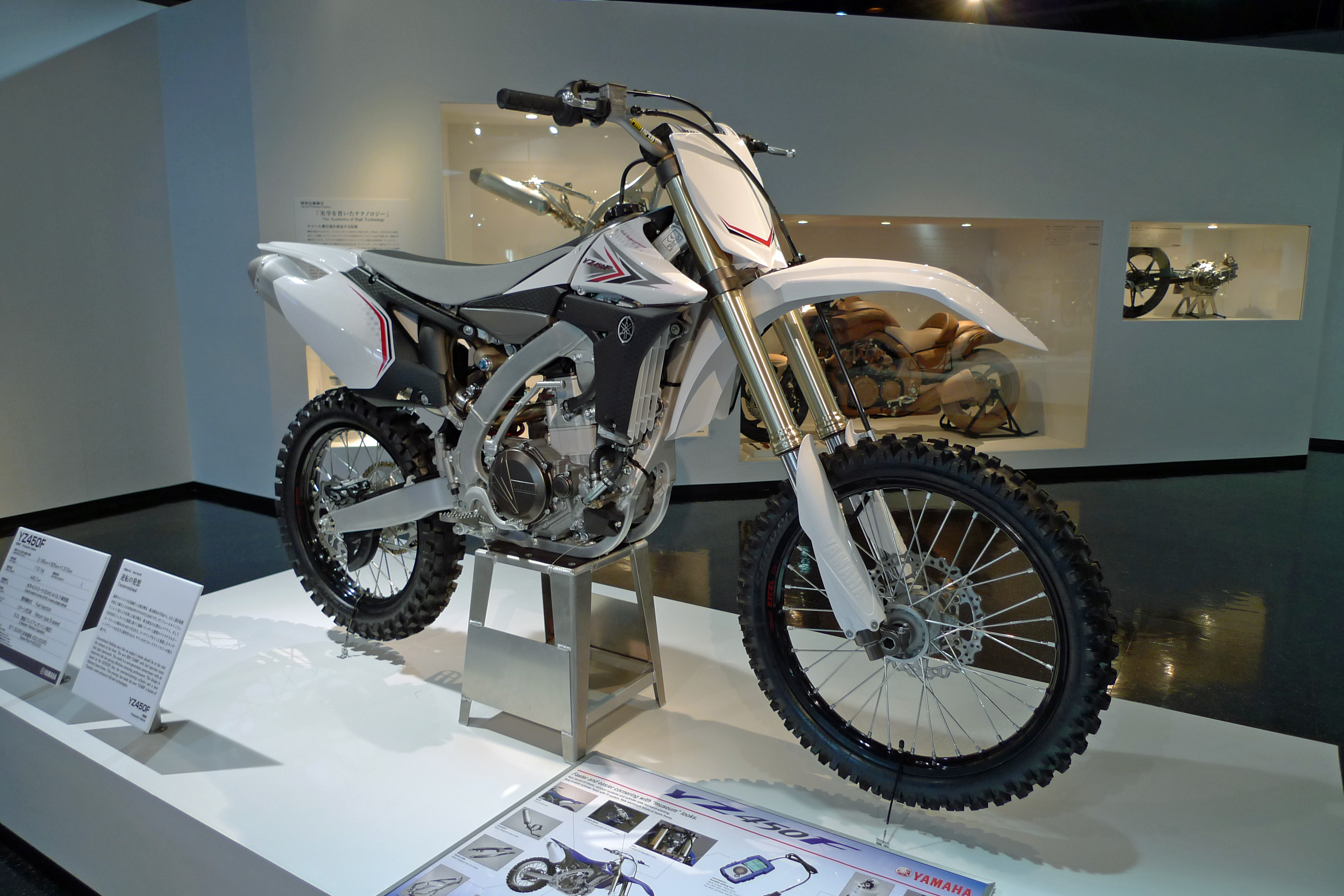
- Production: 2010–2013
- Engine: Rear slant, titanium four-valve, 449 cc (Changed to EFI in 2010)
- Bore / stroke: 97.0 mm x 60.8 mm
- Compression ratio: 12.5:1
- Transmission: 5-speed
- Suspension: KYB
- Brakes: Disc
- Tires: F: 80/100-21, R: 120/80-19
- Related: WR450F, YZ450FX

On September 8, 2009, Yamaha introduced its all-new YZ450F with fuel injection. The engine cylinder is rearward slanted, the crank rod angle has been changed to provide a more complete combustion, the 5-valve head is now a 4-valve head, the gas tank is located under the seat, the exhaust pipe exits the rear of the cylinder, and the air intake is now in the front of the bike. They have a new bi-lateral frame which allows for new improved steering and the new engine components. The entire package comes together to create a bike that is mass-centralized. The bike was introduced by Yamaha Factory Motocross rider James Stewart Jr. The top speed has been recorded at 80 mph stock.

== Sixth generation YZ450F: 2014–2017 ==
The 2014 YZ450F was a new design that retained the reversed-cylinder layout. It shared its frame with the YZ250F and had a new wrap-around exhaust and a wet-sump engine, and access to the air filter was reduced from four steps to two.

== Seventh generation YZ450F: 2018–2022 ==
The 2018 YZ450F introduced an all-new chassis and electric start, powered by a small lithium-ion battery, and the kickstarter was removed. The engine used a 44 mm Mikuni fuel injection system with new intake and exhaust camshafts. The model also introduced the Yamaha Power Tuner, a smartphone app for wirelessly adjusting fuel-injection and ignition maps, which Motorcycle.com described as the first wireless tuning app for dirt bikes.

== Eighth generation YZ450F: 2023–present ==
Eight Generation YZ450F
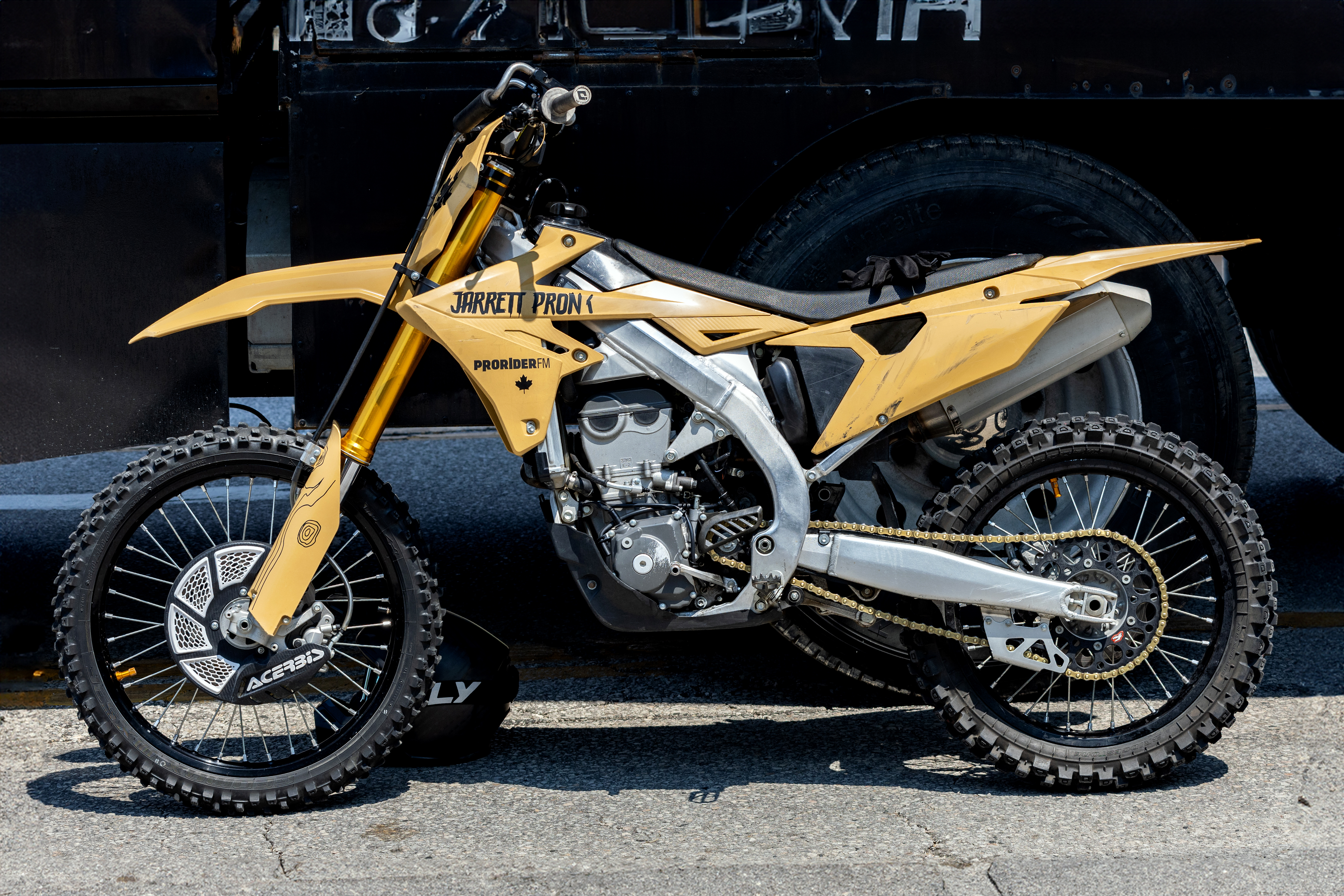
- Production: 2023–Present
- Related: WR450F, YZ450FX

The 2023 YZ450F was redesigned. Yamaha said it was five pounds lighter, three of them from the engine, and that it produced about five percent more power, with a rev limit raised by 500 rpm. Engine changes included new port shapes, larger titanium intake valves, a new forged piston and a dry-sump lubrication system in place of the previous wet sump. The aluminum frame is built from 10 welded components, and an updated Power Tuner app controls launch control and traction control, with two new handlebar switches for changing engine maps while riding.
