= Yamaha YZ250 =

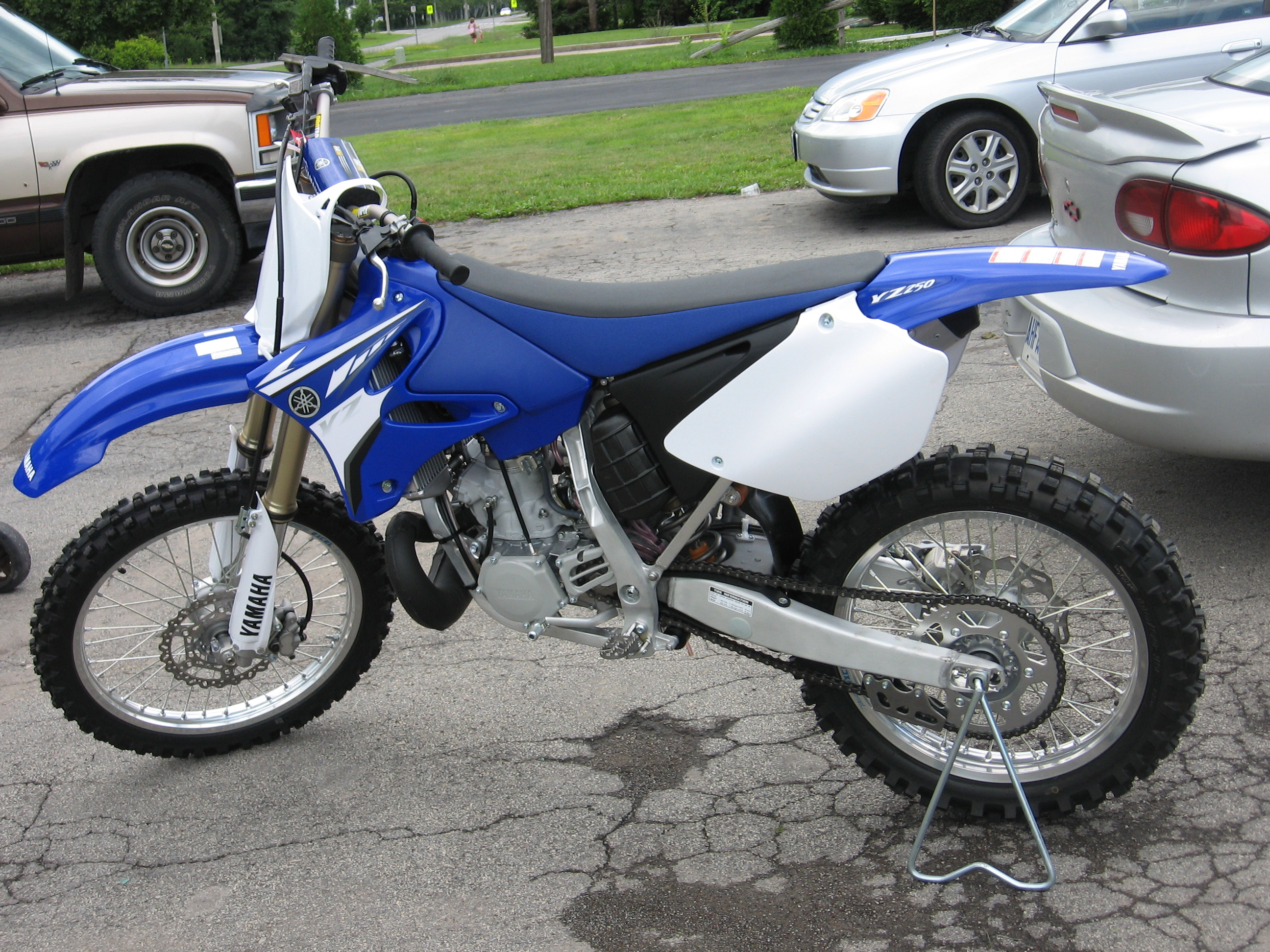
- Manufacturer: Yamaha
- Production: 1974–present
- Successor: YZ450F
- Class: Motocross
- Engine: 249 cc (15.2 cu in) water-cooled reed-valve two-stroke single
- Bore / stroke: 70 mm × 64 mm (2.8 in × 2.5 in); 68 mm × 68 mm (2.7 in × 2.7 in); 66.4 mm × 72 mm (2.61 in × 2.83 in)
- Transmission: 5-speed
- Suspension: Monoshock, 12.8 inches travel
- Brakes: Double disc
- Tires: Front: 80/100-21-51M; Rear: 110/90-19-62M
- Wheelbase: 1,470 mm (57.8 in)
- Dimensions: L: 2,200 mm (85 in); W: 830 mm (32.5 in); H: 1,300 mm (51.2 in)
- Seat height: 990 mm (39.1 in)
- Weight: 103 kg (227 lb) (US 2014 model) (wet)
- Fuel capacity: 7.9 L; 1.7 imp gal (2.1 US gal)
- Related: Yamaha YZ125

The Yamaha YZ250 is a two-stroke motocross race bike made by Yamaha. The model was launched in 1974, and has been regularly updated and is still in production with new releases every year.

== Engine ==
The original YZ250 of 1974 used an air-cooled 250cc two-stroke engine of 70 mm bore and a 64 mm stroke, which was improved semi-annually. The air-cooled motor was replaced in 1982 with a 249 cc liquid-cooled two-stroke reed-valved engine with a mechanical, rather than servo-driven, YPVS exhaust valve for a wider spread of power. Although other makes of contemporaneous motocross engines featured theoretically superior crankcase reed-valves, the YZ250 still has the reed-block integral to the cylinder.

The bore on the water-cooled engine was reduced to 68 mm and the stroke was increased to 68 mm, producing a displacement of 247 cc. In 1999, the bore was further reduced to 66.4 mm and the stroke lengthened to 72 mm, producing a displacement of 249 cc. The longer stroke engine resulted in a lower redline, slightly less top-end power and greatly improved torque at lower RPM. The engine produces a peak 47 horsepower (35 kW) at 8,800 rpm and 30.6 foot-pounds force (41.5 N⋅m) of torque at 7,500 rpm, with a 9,000 rpm redline.

A large range of after-market tuning parts is available, owing to the bike's design being fundamentally unchanged since 1999 and the sheer numbers sold over the last fifty years.

According to US Dirt Bike magazine, it is the last 250 two-stroke from Japan.

== Chassis ==
On its introduction in 1974, the YZ250 used a single backbone steel frame with a twin-shock swingarm. The following year, reflecting the factory racer Hakan Andersson's factory racer, the swingarm became a monoshock unit, initially made of steel, then aluminum from 1978. The swingarm rear suspension system featured more than 12" of travel, while the telescopic inverted front forks had 11.8 inches (300 mm) of travel. In the 2005 model year, the YZ250 gained a new frame made from aluminum that reduced the dry weight to approximately 212 lb (96 kg). All YZ250's feature front and rear hydraulic disc brakes. The 2014 US model had a wet weight of 227 lbs.

== Timeline ==
| 1999 | First year of the current engine |
| 2002 | First year of the current frame geometry and bodywork |
| 2003 | Exhaust port raised about 0.5 mm and higher compression head for USA model. |
| 2005 | Aluminium frame |
| 2006 | KYB SSS forks |
| 2007 | Pro Taper 1-1/8 handlebars |
| 2008 | Smaller fork lugs and shorter lower tubes. Brake calipers also reduced in size + wave rotors. |
| 2011 | No more US model: Bigger silencer and a neutral switch for sound checks. Low compression head. |
| 2015 | New body work (compatible with 2002–2014 bikes). Smaller fork tubes (at top clamp) from the four-stroke. |

== Racing ==
- 5 AMA National Motocross Titles
- 9 AMA National Supercross Titles
- AMA National Supercross 2004 championship, by Chad Reed.
- 6-time AMA National Offroad Championships by Jason Raines

== See also ==
- YZ250F
