= Yamaha WR250F =

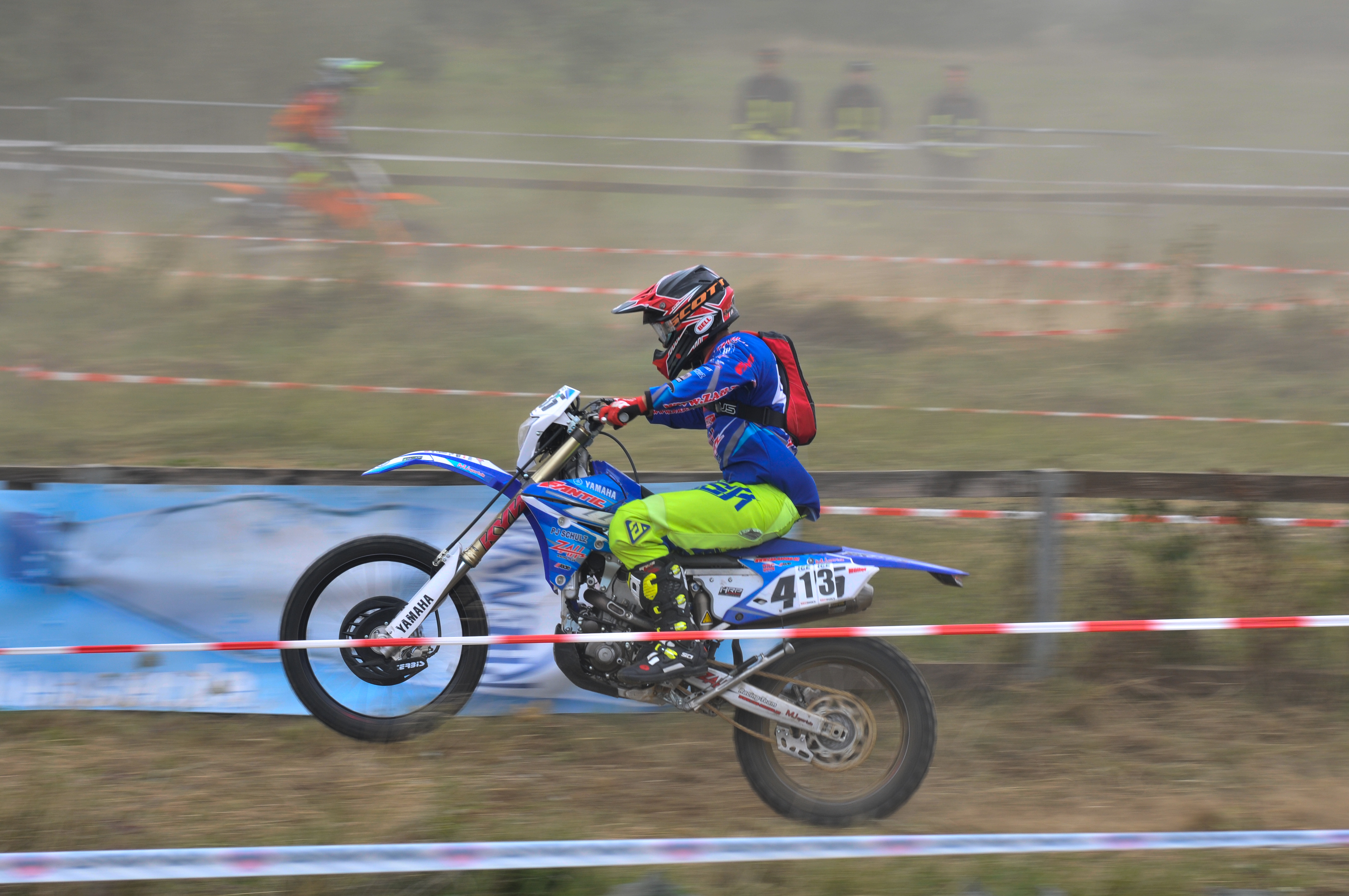
- Manufacturer: Yamaha Motor Company
- Production: 2001–present
- Class: Off road, enduro
- Engine: 246 cc (15.0 cu in) single-cylinder; four-stroke, liquid-cooled, DOHC, 5 titanium valves
- Bore / stroke: 77.0 mm × 53.6 mm (3.03 in × 2.11 in)
- Compression ratio: 12.5:1
- Ignition type: CDI
- Transmission: Constant-mesh 6-speed; multiplate wet clutch, chain drive
- Suspension: Front: Inverted telescopic fork; fully adjustable, 11.8 in (300 mm) travel Rear: single shock; fully adjustable, 12.2 in (310 mm) travel
- Brakes: Front: hydraulic single disc brake, 250 mm Rear: hydraulic single disc brake, 245 mm
- Tires: Front: 80/100-21 51M; Rear: 100/100-18-59M
- Wheelbase: 58.3 in (1,480 mm)
- Dimensions: L: 85.2 in (2,160 mm); W: 32.5 in (830 mm); H: 51.1 in (1,300 mm)
- Seat height: 38.6 in (980 mm)
- Weight: 256 lb (116 kg) (claimed) (wet)
- Fuel capacity: 2.1 US gal (7.9 L; 1.7 imp gal)
- Fuel consumption: 71 mpg_{‑US} (3.3 L/100 km; 85 mpg_{‑imp})
- Related: Yamaha WR450F; Yamaha WR250R

The Yamaha WR250F is an off-road motorcycle made by Yamaha Motor Company. It has a 250 cc (15 cu in) liquid-cooled single-cylinder engine.

== Overview ==
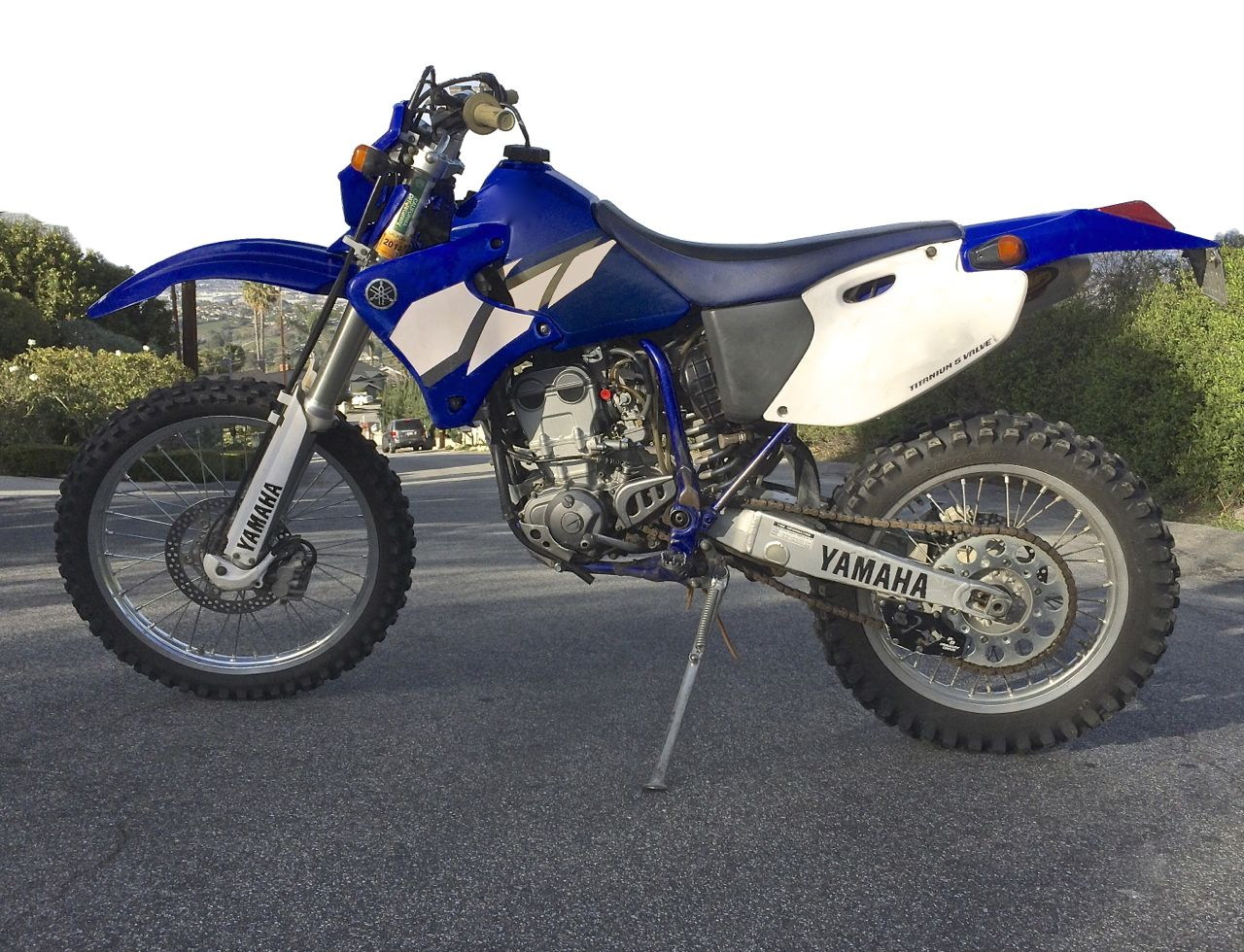
2002 Yamaha WR250F

First offered in 2001, it shared many components and design concepts with the YZ250F motocross model. It is basically the YZ250F detuned slightly for more controllable power, with a headlight, lighting coil, softer suspension, a kickstand, better noise specifications, larger radiators, and lower emissions. The WR250F is basically a YZ250F modified for enduro, extreme enduro and hard enduro competitions and the practice of these extreme sports. The WR in the name indicates a wide-ratio gear box common to most enduro or trail bikes and stands in contrast to the close-ratio gearbox essential to a motocross racer. Over the years the WR250F has benefited from the advances made in the YZF motocross version, gaining advancements such as an aluminum frame and improved suspension.

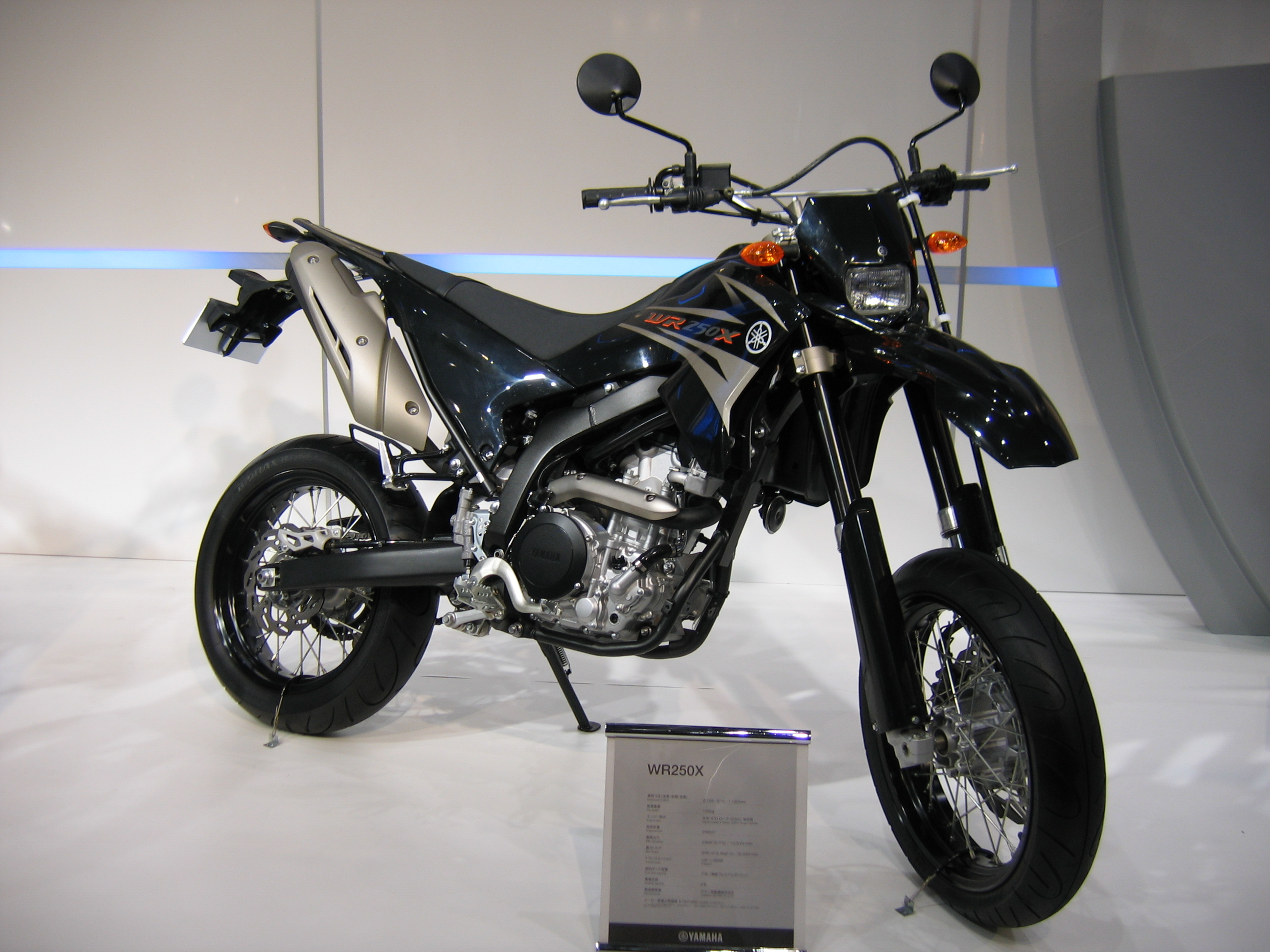
Yamaha WR250X

Despite the similar name, it shares very few common components with the heavier, street-legal dual sport WR250R or its supermoto variant WR250X.

== Significant advances ==
2003	Automatic decompression exhaust cam and electric starter
2006	Digital display
2007	Aluminium frame
2015	Bilateral beam frame, 6-speed transmission, rear slant cylinder, KYB SSS Forks, and fuel injection

== See also ==
- Yamaha YZ250F
