= Yamaha XT250 =

- Manufacturer: Yamaha Motor Company
- Parent company: Yamaha Corporation
- Production: 1980–1990, 2008–present
- Class: Dual-sport

The Yamaha XT250 is a motorcycle made by Yamaha Motor Company.

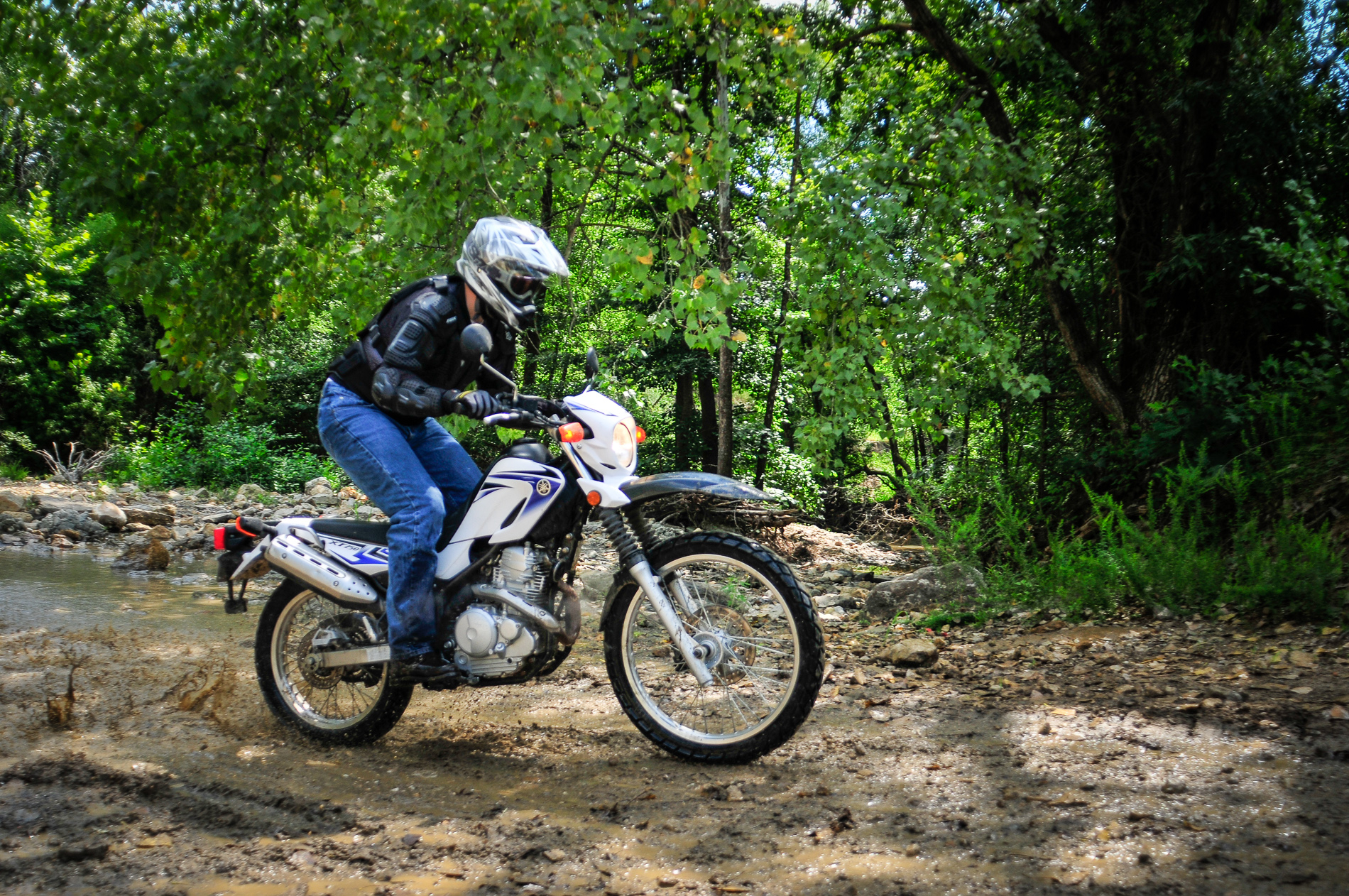
Yamaha XT250 model year 2008. An offroad motorcycle rider passes through a creek and up a muddy hill

== First generation ==
First generation
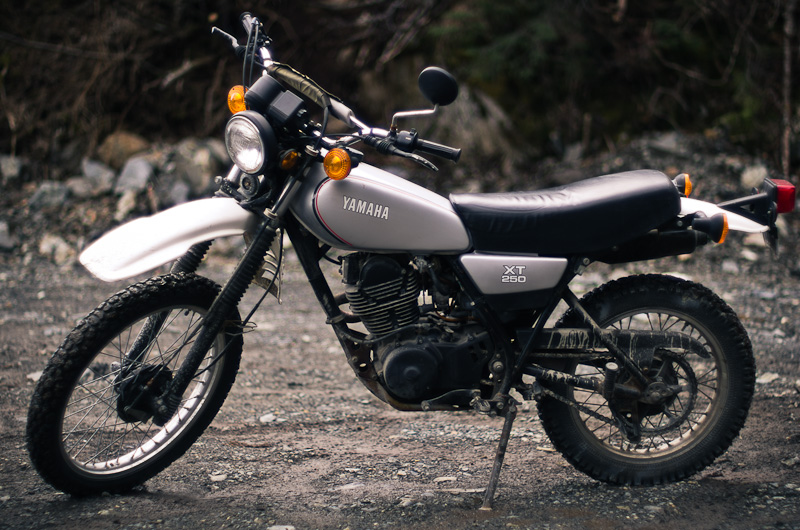
- 1981 Yamaha XT250
- Manufacturer: Yamaha Motor Company
- Parent company: Yamaha Corporation
- Production: 1980–1983
- Class: Dual-sport
- Engine: 4-stroke 249 cc air-cooled, SOHC, single-cylinder, two valves/cyl
- Compression ratio: 9.2:1
- Top speed: 75 mph (121 km/h)
- Power: 22 bhp (16 kW) @ 8600 rpm
- Transmission: 5-speed
- Tires: Front: 3.00-21; Rear: 4.60-17
- Weight: 270 lb (120 kg) (wet)

Released in 1980, this dual-sport motorcycle has been a staple of back roads and farms. One was ridden by Rambo in the 1982 movie First Blood.

It also featured in Season 4 of Knight Rider, as Reginald Cornelius III/RC3's bike.

In addition, the XT500 was featured in multiple exciting stunt scenes used throughout the first half of the 1981 James Bond film For Your Eyes Only (film)

== Second generation ==
Second generation
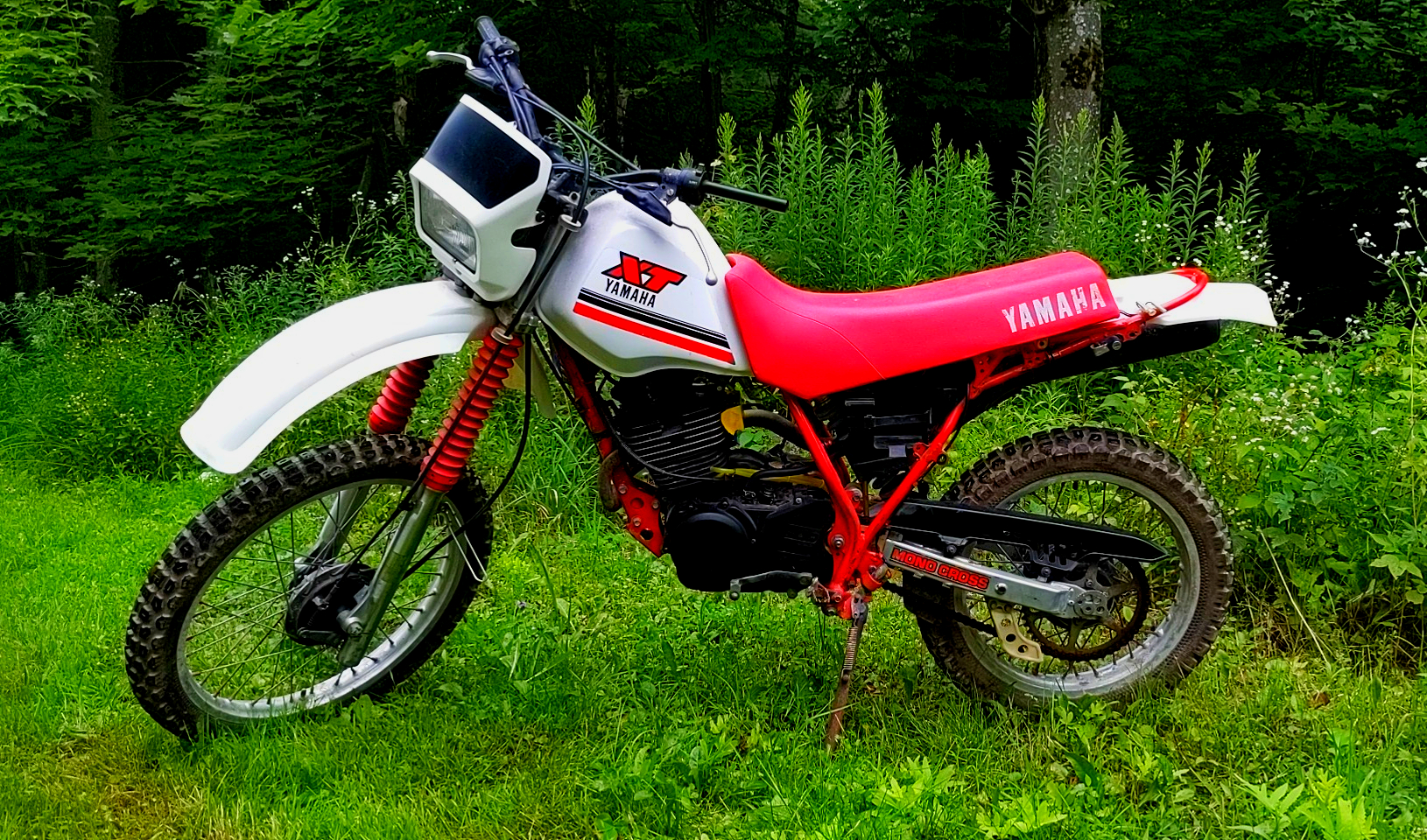
- 1984 Yamaha XT 250
- Manufacturer: Yamaha Motor Company
- Parent company: Yamaha Corporation
- Production: 1984–1990
- Class: Dual-sport
- Engine: 4-stroke 249 cc air-cooled, DOHC, single-cylinder, four valves/cyl
- Bore / stroke: 73 mm × 59.6 mm (2.87 in × 2.35 in)
- Compression ratio: 9.2:1
- Top speed: 69 mph (111 km/h)
- Power: 17 bhp (13 kW) @ 7500 rpm
- Transmission: 6-speed
- Tires: Front: 3.00-21; Rear: 4.60-17
- Weight: 271 lb (123 kg) (wet)

Starting in 1984, this model had its top-end output reduced to 17 hp @ 7,500 rpm due to emissions control considerations. In addition, this model featured redesigned plastics and a more compact gasoline tank.

== Third generation ==
Third generation
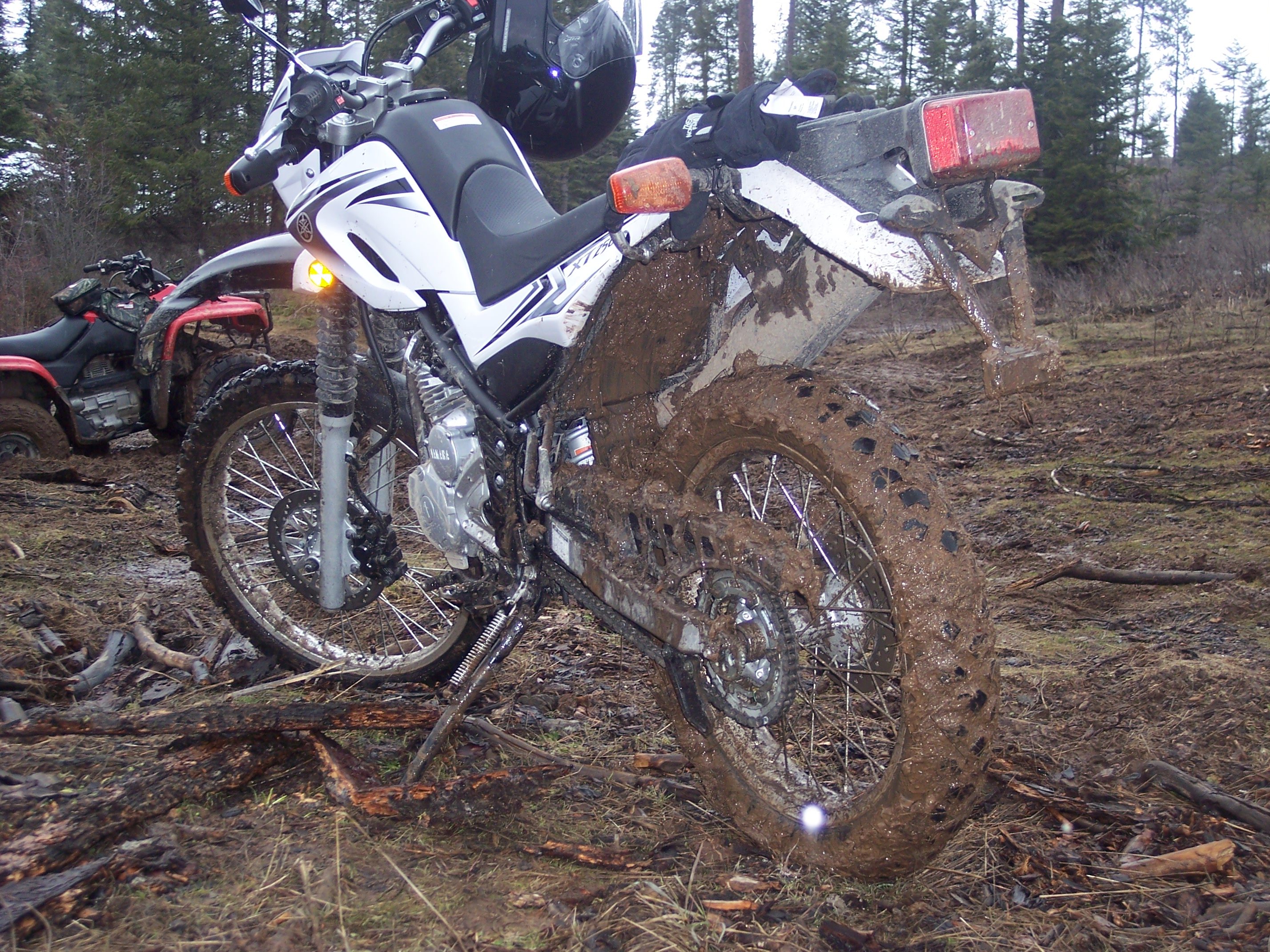
- 2008 Yamaha XT250
- Manufacturer: Yamaha Motor Company
- Parent company: Yamaha Corporation
- Production: 2008–present
- Class: Dual-sport
- Engine: 4-stroke 249 cc air-cooled, SOHC, single-cylinder, two valves/cyl
- Compression ratio: 9.5:1
- Top speed: 76 mph (122 km/h)
- Power: 16.2 bhp (12.1 kW) @ 7000 rpm
- Torque: 12.9 lb⋅ft (17.5 N⋅m) @ 6500 rpm
- Transmission: 5-speed
- Tires: Front: 2.75-21; Rear: 120/80-18
- Weight: 291 lb (132 kg) (wet)

Having been discontinued in 1991 in favor of the Yamaha XT350, this model was reintroduced in 2008, replacing the Yamaha XT225, due to increased popularity of the 250 cc class. The XT250 is branded the SEROW 250 in Japan. In 2013, the USA XT250 received a fuel-injected engine.

In January 2020, Yamaha Japan released the Serow Final Model, discontinuing the little bike due to increasing emission requirements. This is its final year. Yamaha US has continued the model unchanged.

(For the origin of the name, see serow.)
