= Yamaha WR450F =

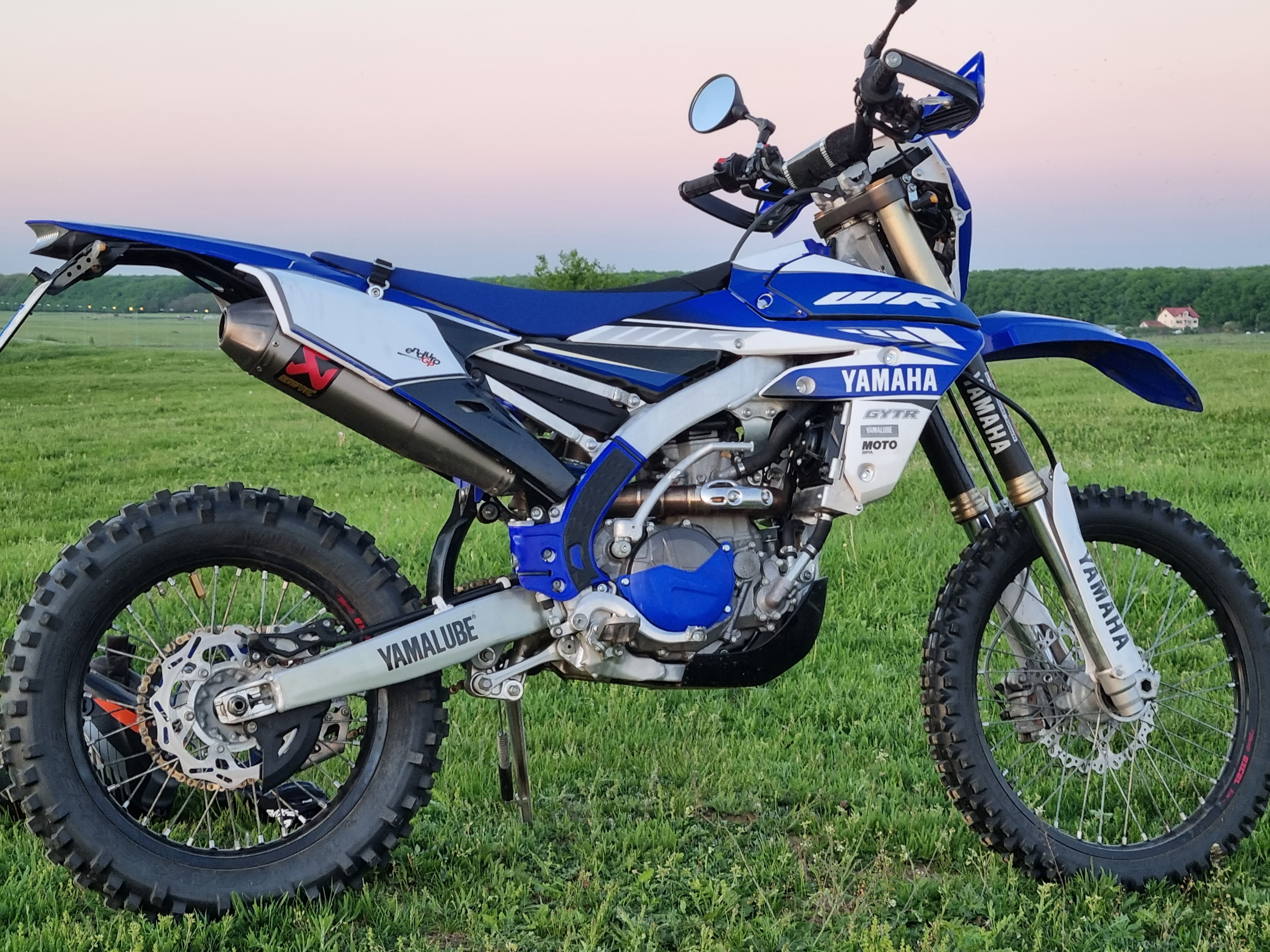
- 2016 Yamaha WR450F
- Manufacturer: Yamaha Motor Company
- Parent company: Yamaha Corporation
- Production: 1998–present
- Class: Enduro
- Engine: Single-cylinder, DOHC, Multivalve, water-cooled, four-stroke
- Transmission: 5-speed, wet clutch, chain drive
- Suspension: Front: Kayaba inverted fork; fully adjustable Rear: single shock; fully adjustable
- Brakes: Hydraulic single disc brakes
- Tires: Front: 21 in (530 mm); Rear: 18 in (460 mm)
- Related: Yamaha WR250F

The Yamaha WR450F is an off-road motorcycle made by Yamaha Motor Company. It currently has a 450 cc (27 cu in) liquid-cooled single-cylinder engine.

== History ==
First offered in 1998 at 400cc, it shared many components and design concepts with the YZ400F motocross model. It is basically the racing YZ450F detuned slightly for more controllable power, with a headlight and lighting coil, softer suspension, a kickstand, lower noise specifications, larger radiators and lower emissions. The WR in the name indicates a wide-ratio gear box common to most enduro or trail bikes and stands in contrast to the close-ratio gearbox essential to a motocross racer. Over the years the WR has benefited from the advances made in the YZ motocross version gaining displacement and advancements such as an aluminum frame and improved suspension. Over much of its life the weight of the WR450F has remained fairly constant ranging from 244 to 249 pounds dry weight.

| 1998 | |
| 2001 | 426cc displacement, updated clutch basket |
| 2003 | 450cc displacement, automatic decompression exhaust cam and electric starting, side access airbox |
| 2006 | Digital display, revised CDI map |
| 2007 | Aluminium frame, new headlight, LED taillight, revised dry-sump engine & camshafts (less lift and duration) |
| 2012 | Fuel injection, YZ250F chassis, KYB SSS-type forks, revised engine position. |
| 2016 | Reverse slant, 4-valve engine |
| 2019 | Kickstart removed |

== First generation (WR400F, 1998) ==
First Generation WR400F
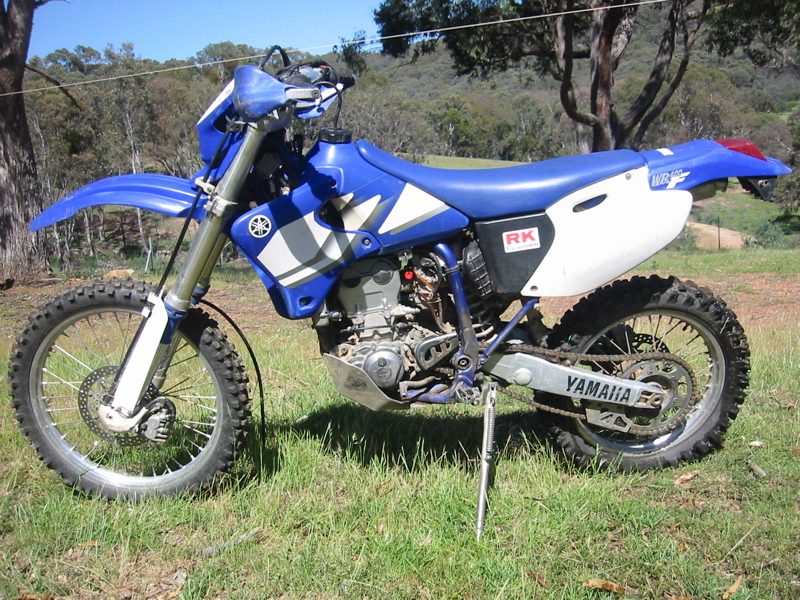
- Manufacturer: Yamaha
- Production: 1998-1999
- Successor: WR426F
- Engine: Five-valve, 400 cc
- Wheelbase: 1998-1999: 1,495 mm (59 in) 2000: 1,490 mm (59 in)
- Dimensions: L: 1998-1999: 2,191 mm (86 in) 2000: 2,171 mm (85 in); W: 827 mm (33 in); H: 1,303 mm (51 in)
- Seat height: 991 mm (39 in)
- Weight: 271 lb (123 kg) (wet)
- Fuel capacity: 3.2 US gal (12 L; 2.7 imp gal)

Yamaha introduced the WR 400F in 1998. The 400F is a 400 cc (24 cu in) four-stroke off-road motorcycle produced for three years, beginning in 1998 and ending in 2000 (only the YZ was upgraded to 426 cc in 2000). The WR400F is related to the YZ400F, a motocross model. Like the YZ400, it was considered to be a groundbreaking model in motorcycle history, ushering in the four-stroke era which ended the dominance of two-stroke engines in motocross and offroad racing. While many modern performance four-stroke dirt bikes have been criticized for excessive rebuild costs and short motor lifespans, the Yamaha WR400F has an impressive record of reliability, often attributed to its steel valves and generous oil capacity.

== Second generation (WR426F, 2001) ==
Second Generation WR426F
- Production: 2001-2003
- Predecessor: WR400F
- Successor: WR450F
- Engine: Titanium five-valve, 426 cc, 95mm x 60.1mm stroke, compression ratio 12.5:1
- Brakes: 250mm front, 245mm rear
- Tires: Front: 80/100-21; Rear: 120/90-18
- Wheelbase: 1,490 mm (59 in)
- Dimensions: L: 2,171 mm (85 in); W: 827 mm (33 in); H: 1,490 mm (59 in)
- Seat height: 1,303 mm (51.3 in)
- Weight: 122 kg (269 lb) (wet)
- Fuel capacity: 3.2 US gal (12 L; 2.7 imp gal)

In 2001 the WR400F's became the WR426F, increasing the displacement to 426 cc (26.0 cu in) for greater power and throttle response. A beefier YZ style clutch basket and plates than those on the WR400 improved clutch performance. Frame geometry was identical to the 2002 YZ250 and YZ426F with a 58.7 inch wheelbase and 14.7 inches of ground clearance. This was the last WR to make use of a manual compression release for starting.

== Third generation (WR450F, 2003) ==
Third Generation WR450F
- Production: 2003-2006
- Predecessor: WR426F
- Engine: Titanium five-valve, 449 cc, 95mm x 63.4mm stroke, compression ratio 12.3:1
- Frame type: Steel
- Suspension: Front: 11.8 in (300 mm) travel Rear: 11.6-in travel
- Brakes: Front: 250 mm disc Rear: 245 mm disc
- Tires: Front: 80/100-21 51M; Rear: 110/100-18 64M
- Wheelbase: 58.5 in (1,486 mm)
- Dimensions: L: 85.6 in (2,174 mm); W: 32.5 in (826 mm); H: 51 in (1,295 mm)
- Seat height: 38.6 in (980 mm)
- Weight: 244 lb (111 kg) (dry); 273 lb (124 kg) (wet)
- Fuel capacity: 2.6 US gal (9.8 L; 2.2 imp gal) 2003-2005, 2.1 US gal (7.9 L) 2006
- Related: YZ450F, WR250F

For 2003, the engine displacement was increased to 449 cc (27.4 cu in), the fuel tank was reduced to 2.6 gallons and an electric starter was added as standard equipment. The 2005 WR weighed in at 244 pounds dry, the seat height was reduced to 38 inches and the fuel tank was decreased to 2.1 gallons. The 2006 WR weighed in at 249 pounds dry and produced 42 horsepower.

A limited production version of the WR450F was the WR450F 2-Trac, which featured 2-wheel drive. The gearbox output sprocket drove a short, fully enclosed chain to a pump, which in turn pushed the oil to the front hub via the pipe and back via the parallel pipe. A maximum of 15% of the power was transmitted to the front wheel at any time. Yamaha planned on building 250 2-Tracs in 2004, but only a few were built, which were used for enduro racing. 2006 was the last year of the steel frames.

The 2003 and 2004 models were red sticker bikes in California.

== Fourth generation (WR450F, 2007) ==
Fourth Generation WR450F
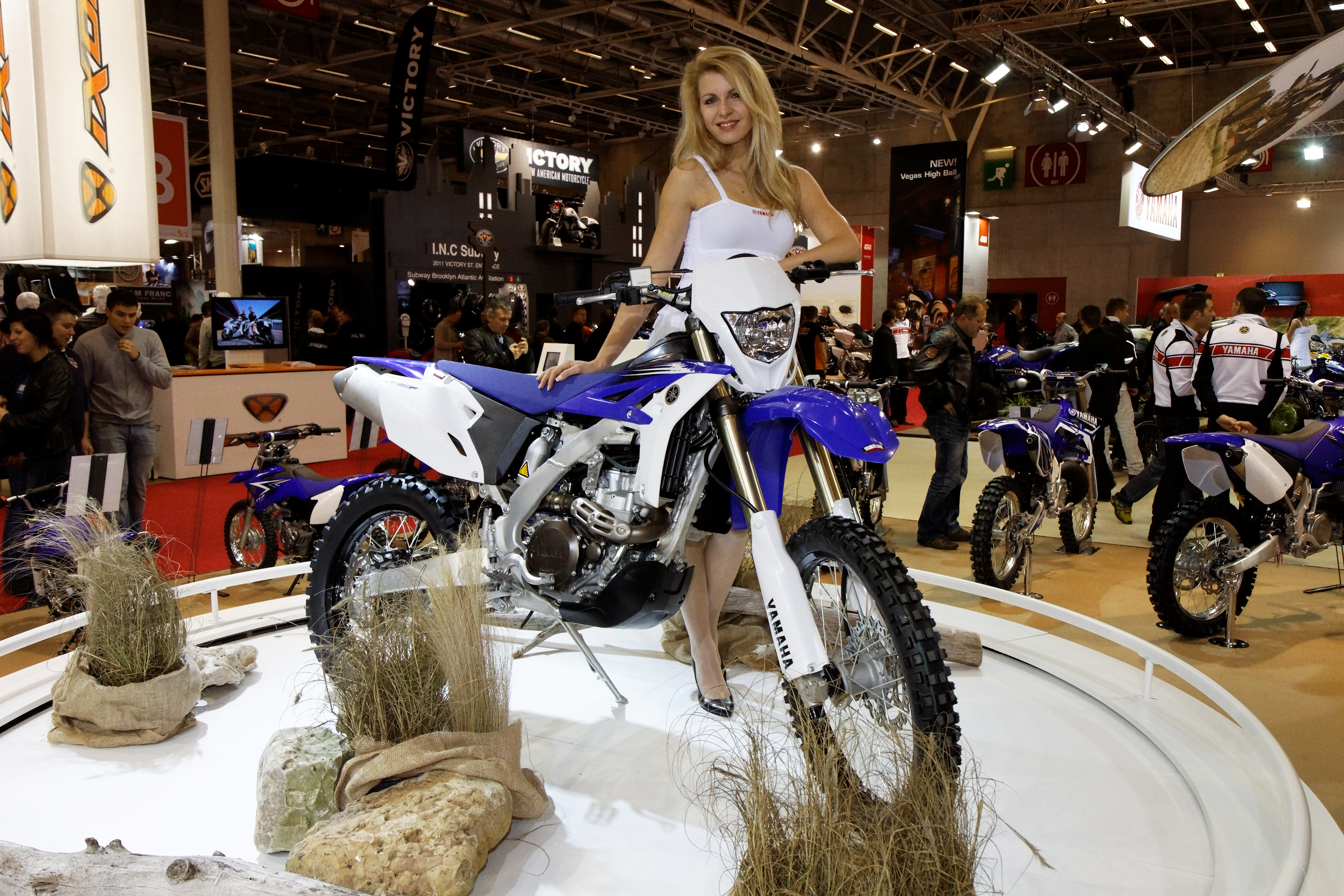
- 2011 Yamaha WR450F
- Manufacturer: Yamaha Motor Corporation
- Production: 2007-2011
- Predecessor: WR450F
- Engine: Titanium five-valve, 449 cc, 95mm x 63.4mm stroke, compression ratio 12.3:1
- Transmission: 5-speed, constant mesh
- Frame type: Aluminum, semi-double cradle
- Suspension: Front: KYB cartridge forks with 11.8 in (300 mm) travel Rear: KYB shock with 12 in (305 mm) travel
- Brakes: Front: 250 mm disc Rear: 245 mm disc
- Tires: Front: 80/100-21 51M; Rear: 110/100-18 64M
- Rake, trail: 27.3°, 117 mm (4.6 in)
- Wheelbase: 1,485 mm (58 in)
- Dimensions: L: 2,175 mm (86 in); W: 825 mm (32 in); H: 1,295 mm (51 in)
- Seat height: 980 mm (39 in)
- Weight: 248 lb (112 kg) (dry); 273 lb (124 kg) (wet)
- Fuel capacity: 2.11 US gal (8.0 L)
- Related: YZ450F, WR250F

For 2007, the WR gained an aluminum frame dropping the weight from 249 to 246 pounds. In addition to the aluminum frame, the 2007 WR450F saw a revised dry-sump engine, with a new balancer, cylinder head, and camshafts with less lift and duration than previous generations and restyled plastics. 2009 saw new graphics, and 2010 was not sold in the US.

== Fifth generation (WR450F, 2012) ==
Fifth Generation WR450F
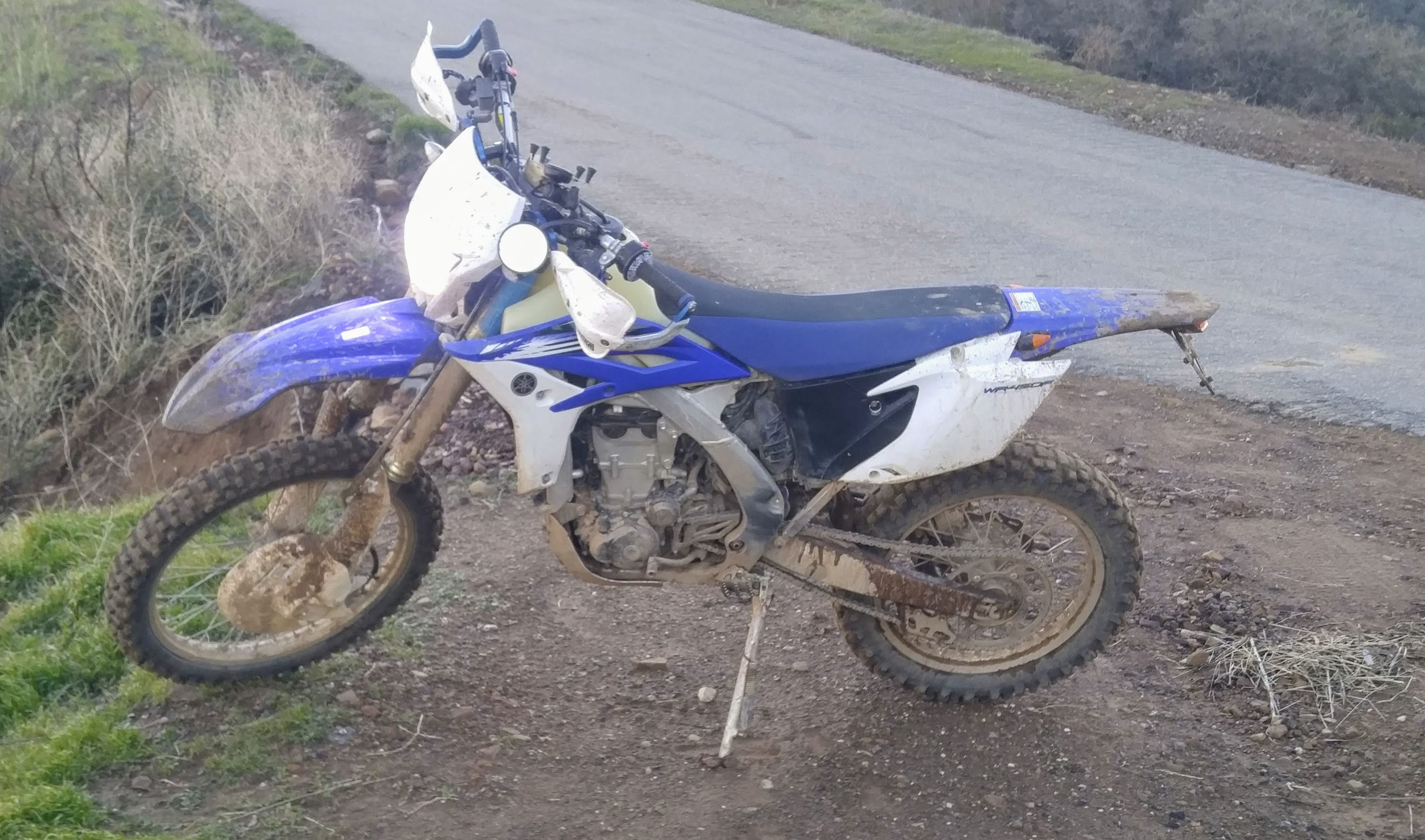
- 2012 Yamaha WR450F
- Manufacturer: Yamaha Motor Corporation
- Production: 2012-2015
- Predecessor: WR450F
- Engine: Titanium five-valve, 449 cc, 95mm x 63.4mm stroke, compression ratio 12.3:1
- Transmission: 5-speed, constant-mesh
- Frame type: Aluminum, semi-double cradle
- Suspension: Front: KYB SSS cartridge forks with 11.8 in (300 mm) travel Rear: KYB shock with 12 in (305 mm) travel
- Brakes: Front: 250 mm disc Rear: 245 mm disc
- Tires: Front: 80/100-21 51M; Rear: 120/90-18 65M
- Rake, trail: 27.0°, 117 mm (4.6 in)
- Wheelbase: 1,465 mm (58 in)
- Dimensions: L: 2,160 mm (85 in); W: 825 mm (32 in); H: 1,275 mm (50 in)
- Seat height: 960 mm (38 in)
- Weight: 273 lb (124 kg) (wet)
- Fuel capacity: 1.98 US gal (7.5 L)
- Oil capacity: 1.27 US qt (1.20 L)
- Related: YZ450F, WR250F

After 3 years of design, the all-new 2012 WR450F was released and featured a 2012 YZ250F frame, KYB SSS forks, fuel injection, and an altered motor position. Per Yamaha's designers, the only modifications required to the YZ250F chassis were updated motor mounts. The engine was rotated back to move the center of gravity and improve handling

== Sixth generation (WR450F, 2016) ==
Sixth Generation WR450F
- Production: 2016-2018
- Predecessor: WR450F
- Engine: Fuel-injected, Titanium four-valve, 97.0 mm x 60.8 mm stroke, compression ratio 12.5:1
- Suspension: Front: 12.2 in (310 mm) travel Rear: 12.5 in (318 mm) travel
- Brakes: Front: 270 mm disc Rear: 245 mm disc
- Tires: Front: 80/100-21 51M; Rear: 120/90-18 64M
- Wheelbase: 57.7 in (1,466 mm)
- Dimensions: L: 85.2 in (2,164 mm); W: 32.5 in (826 mm); H: 50.4 in (1,280 mm)
- Seat height: 38.0 in (965 mm)
- Weight: 249 lb (113 kg) (dry); 271 lb (123 kg) (wet)
- Fuel capacity: 2.0 US gal (7.6 L; 1.7 imp gal)
- Related: Yamaha YZ450FX

For 2016, the WR was given the reverse slant, 4-valve, fuel injected motor previously available in the YZ450F since 2010. Yamaha also introduced a new model, the YZ450FX, a more Enduro competition oriented version of the off-road 450 utilizing more design elements of the motocross model such as stiffer suspension while maintaining electric start and the 18" rear wheel.

For 2017, the WR450F largely remained the same, except for modifications to the air box cover as well as a change from silver to black rims.

For 2018, the WR450F remained similar to the 2016-2017 models, with a large distinction being that the bike was no longer available to register as green sticker in the state of California. 2018 also saw the removal of the kick starter.

https://www.yamahamotorsports.com/off-road/models/2016/wr450f

== Seventh generation (WR450F, 2019) ==
Seventh Generation WR450F
- Production: 2019-2020
- Predecessor: WR450F
- Engine: Fuel-injected, Titanium four-valve, 97.0 mm x 60.9 mm stroke, compression ratio 12.8:1
- Suspension: Front: 12.2 in (310 mm) travel Rear: 12.5 in (318 mm) travel
- Brakes: Front: 270 mm disc Rear: 245 mm disc
- Tires: Front: 80/100-21; Rear: 120/90-18
- Wheelbase: 58.3 in (1,481 mm)
- Dimensions: L: 85.6 in (2,174 mm); W: 32.5 in (826 mm); H: 50.0 in (1,270 mm)
- Seat height: 37.6 in (955 mm)
- Weight: 265 lb (120 kg) (wet)
- Fuel capacity: 2.2 US gal (8.3 L; 1.8 imp gal)

The 2019 WR450F saw a more powerful motor & updated frame. Other changes include a revised, more compact frame, new speed sensor, bigger fuel tank and one fastener airbox access.

== Seventh generation (WR450F, 2021) ==
The 2021 WR450F saw new cylinder head, camshafts, piston and connecting rods as well as a revised chassis.

== See also ==
- Yamaha YZ450F
- Yamaha YZ450FX
