= Yamaha YZ250F =

YZ250F
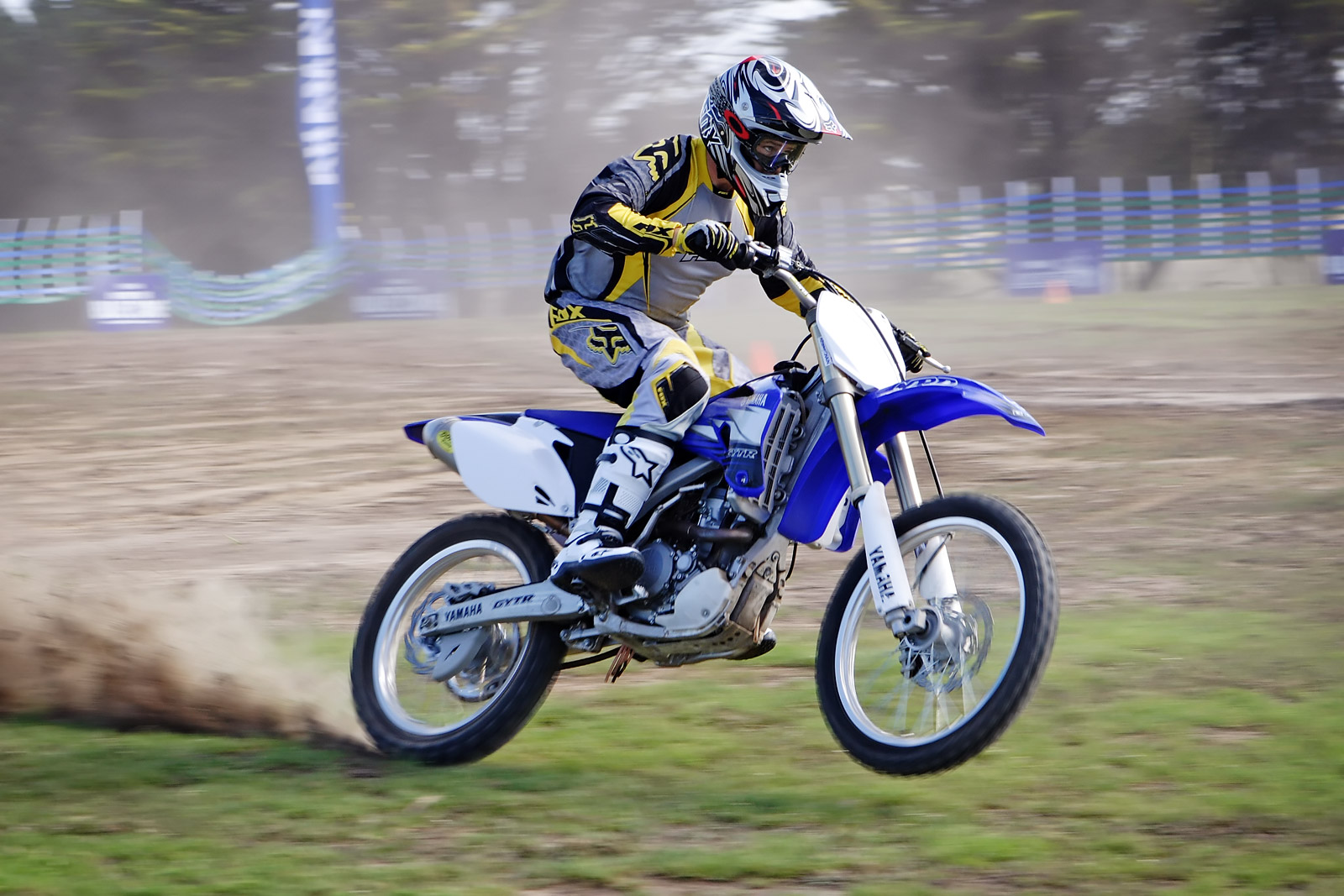
- 2007 Yamaha YZ250F
- Manufacturer: Yamaha Motor Company
- Production: 2001–present
- Class: Motocross
- Engine: 249 cc (15.2 cu in) single-cylinder, water-cooled, four-stroke, DOHC
- Bore / stroke: 77 mm × 53.6 mm (3.03 in × 2.11 in)
- Power: 42.9 hp (32.0 kW)
- Torque: 29.5 N⋅m (21.8 lbf⋅ft)
- Transmission: 5-speed
- Suspension: KYB
- Brakes: disc (front, back)
- Tires: 80/100-21, 110/90-19
- Wheelbase: 57.8 in (1,470 mm)
- Dimensions: L: 85 in (2,200 mm); W: 32.5 in (830 mm); H: 51.2 in (1,300 mm)
- Seat height: 38.7 in (980 mm)
- Weight: 204 lb (93 kg) (dry)
- Fuel capacity: 1.6 US gal (6.1 L; 1.3 imp gal) (2024 model)
- Related: Yamaha YZ450F

The Yamaha YZ250F is a motocross motorcycle first released in 2001 by Yamaha. It features a DOHC, four-stroke engine and initially had a steel frame and subframe in 2001–2002. In 2003 it received an aluminum subframe, which was replaced in the 2006 model with an all-aluminum frame.

The YZ250F has been praised for combining the broad-power characteristics of a four-stroke engine with the light handling more common in smaller, 125 cc two-stroke motorcycles.

Despite the similar name to the YZ250, very few parts have been shared between the models through their history.

== Significant advances ==
2003	Automatic decompression exhaust cam
2006	Aluminium frame
2010	New engine
2010	New engine layout, with lower center of gravity
2014	Rear slant cylinder, 4-valve head, fuel injection
2018	Electric starter

== See also ==
- Yamaha YZ250
- Yamaha YZ125
- Yamaha YZ85
- Kawasaki KX100
