= Yamaha XT225 =

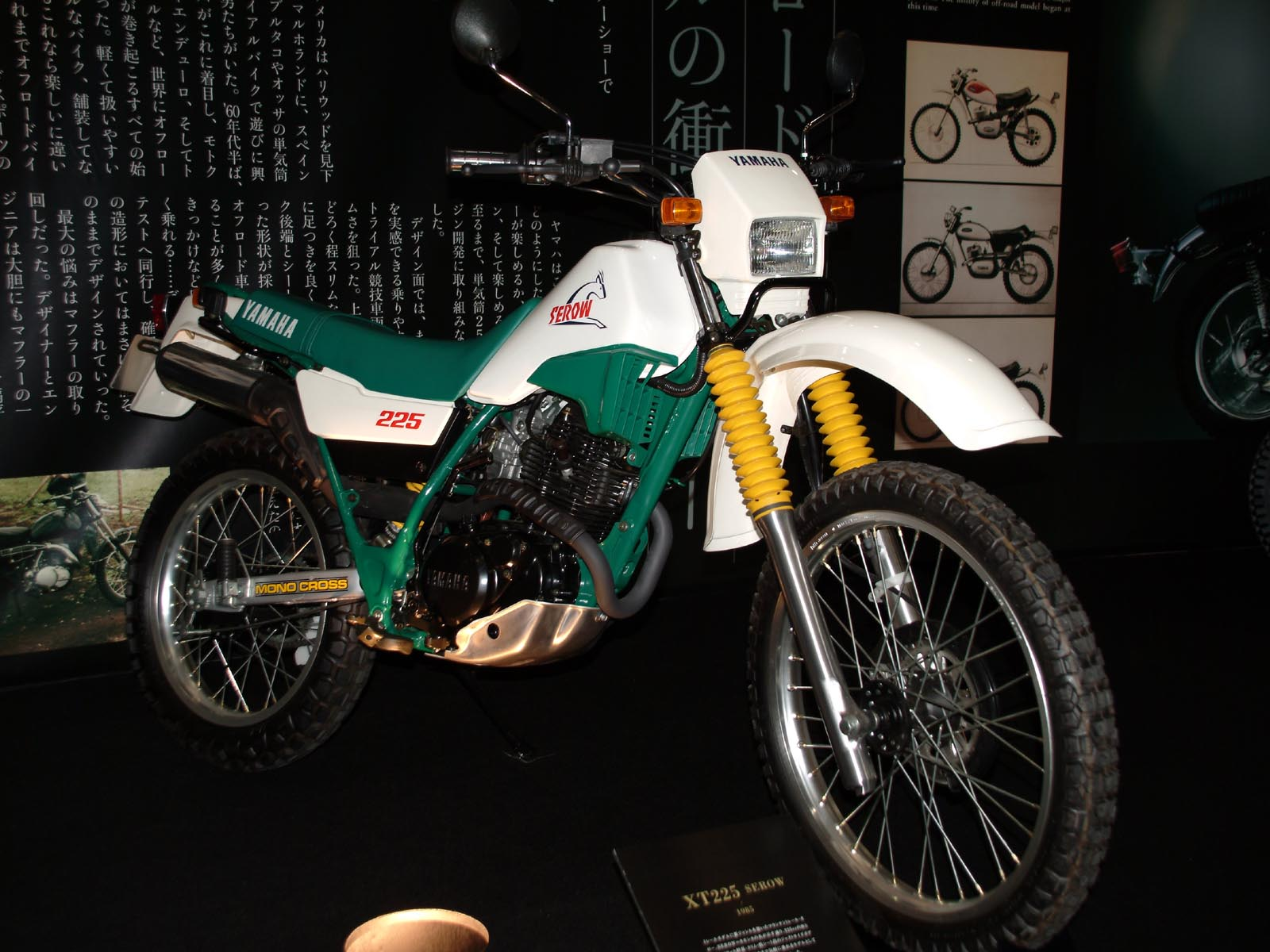
- Manufacturer: Yamaha Motor Company
- Also called: Yamaha Serow
- Production: 1986–2007
- Successor: XT250
- Class: Dual-sport
- Engine: 223 cc, Single-cylinder, air-cooled, four-stroke, SOHC, 2-valves
- Compression ratio: 9.5:1
- Power: 20 hp (15 kW)
- Torque: 19 N⋅m (14 lb⋅ft)
- Transmission: 6-speed
- Suspension: Front: telescopic Rear: swingarm with rebound adjust
- Brakes: Front: 220mm disc Rear: 110mm drum
- Tires: Front: 21 inch Rear: 18 inch
- Wheelbase: 53.1 in (1,349 mm)
- Dimensions: L: 81.5 in (2,070 mm); W: 31.7 in (805 mm); H: 45.7 in (1,161 mm)
- Seat height: 31.9 in (810 mm)
- Weight: 238 lb (108 kg) (dry)
- Fuel capacity: 2.3 US gal (8.7 L)
- Related: TT-R225

The Yamaha XT225, or known in some markets as the Yamaha Serow (from the Japanese serow), was a dual-sport motorcycle produced by Yamaha from 1986 to 2007. The XT225 was preceded and superseded by the XT250. Power is supplied by a 223cc single-cylinder, air-cooled four-stroke engine featuring a SOHC and 2 valves. The engine produces 15 kW of power and 19Nm of torque. The XT225 has a reputation for being a lightweight dual-purpose motorcycle which is suited to many applications.
