= Fazer (disambiguation) =

Fazer is a Finnish food company.

Fazer may also refer to:

- Fazer (rapper), English rapper
- The Yamaha Fazer series of motorcycles
  - Yamaha FZS600 Fazer
  - Yamaha FZ6 (also known as the FZ6 Fazer in some markets)
  - Yamaha FZ8 and FAZER8
  - Yamaha FZ1 (also known as the FZ1 Fazer in some markets)
- Fazer, an album by Sun Dial
- A Portuguese word that means to do
- "Fazer", a song by Quicksand from Slip

== See also ==
- Yamaha Phazer, a snowmobile
- Phaser (disambiguation)
- Phasor (disambiguation)
