= Yamaha FZ16 =

Naked bike model from Yamaha

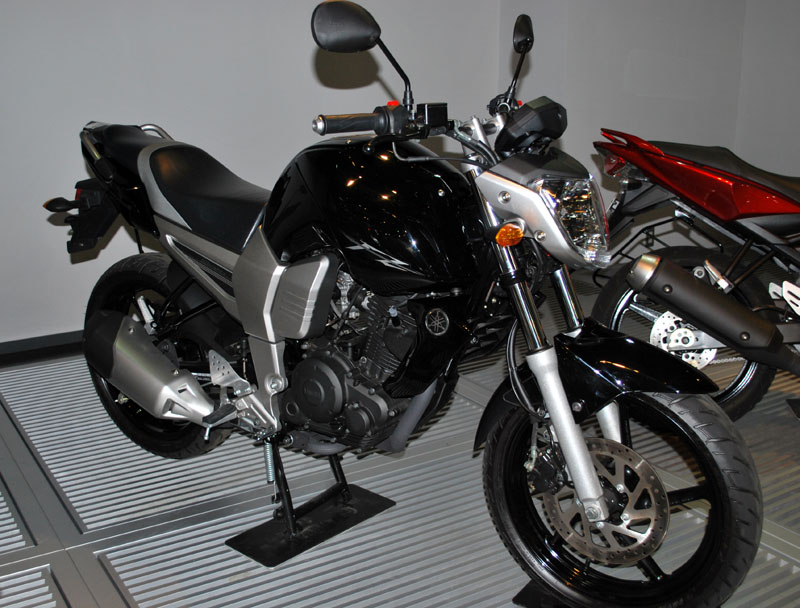
- Yamaha FZ16
- Manufacturer: Yamaha Motor Company
- Also called: Yamaha Byson (Indonesia)
- Parent company: Yamaha Corporation
- Production: 2008; 18 years ago to present
- Assembly: India (2008–present); Indonesia: Karawang, West Java (Yamaha Indonesia Motor Manufacturing, 2010–present)
- Class: Standard; Naked bike
- Engine: 153 cc (9.34 cu in) carburetted air-cooled 4-stroke 2-valve SOHC single-cylinder (2008–2014); 149 cc (9.09 cu in) fuel injected air-cooled 4-stroke 2-valve SOHC single-cylinder (2014–present)
- Bore / stroke: 58.0 mm × 57.9 mm (2.283 in × 2.280 in) (2008–2014); 57.3 mm × 57.9 mm (2.256 in × 2.280 in) (2014–present)
- Compression ratio: 9.5:1
- Top speed: 112.34 km/h (69.80 mph)
- Ignition type: CDI
- Transmission: 5-speed manual, constant-mesh
- Frame type: Steel diamond
- Suspension: Front: 41 mm (1.6 in) telescopic fork; Rear: Steel swingarm with monoshock
- Brakes: Front: Dual-piston caliper with single 267–282 mm (10.5–11.1 in) disc; Rear: Drum (2008–present); single-piston caliper with single 220 mm (8.7 in) disc (2018–)
- Tires: Front: 100/80-17; Rear: 140/60-17, Indonesia: 120/70-17 (2008–2014); 130/70-17 (2014–present)
- Wheelbase: 1,355 mm (53.3 in) (2008–2014); 1,340 mm (52.8 in) (2014–present)
- Dimensions: L: 1,975 mm (77.8 in) (2008–2014); 1,990 mm (78.3 in) (2014–present); W: 770 mm (30.3 in) (2008–2014); 780 mm (30.7 in) (2014–present); H: 1,045 mm (41.1 in)
- Seat height: 790 mm (31.1 in)
- Fuel capacity: 12 L (2.6 imp gal; 3.2 US gal)
- Related: Yamaha FZ Series

The Yamaha FZ16 (called Yamaha Byson in Indonesia) is a standard motorcycle made by Yamaha since 2008. The FZ16 is modeled after the FZ1. The FZ16 is primarily sold in India, and other markets such as Indonesia, Colombia, Argentina and Malaysia.

In 2014, the fuel-injected version, called FZ FI, went on sale in India. Its engine displacement was reduced to 149 cc (9.1 cu in) from 153 cc (9.3 cu in), resulting in less power and torque from the carburetted version, but lower fuel consumption.

In 2015, the Indonesian Byson FI went on sale. According to Yamaha, the bike has 91 different components from the version that sold in India.

== Yamaha FZ25 (FZ250) ==
In 2017, Yamaha launched the FZ25, a 250 cc derivative of the FZ series. It also has an air-cooled, 2-valve, fuel-injected engine. Yamaha said the FZ25 is aimed at existing Yamaha owners. MotorBeam tested the FZ25 and found it to offer "smooth performance" with "excellent engine refinement". The bike is also sold in Brazil as the Fazer 250.

In 2019, the third generation model of the FZ and FZ-S was introduced in India.

== FZ16 Fazer ==
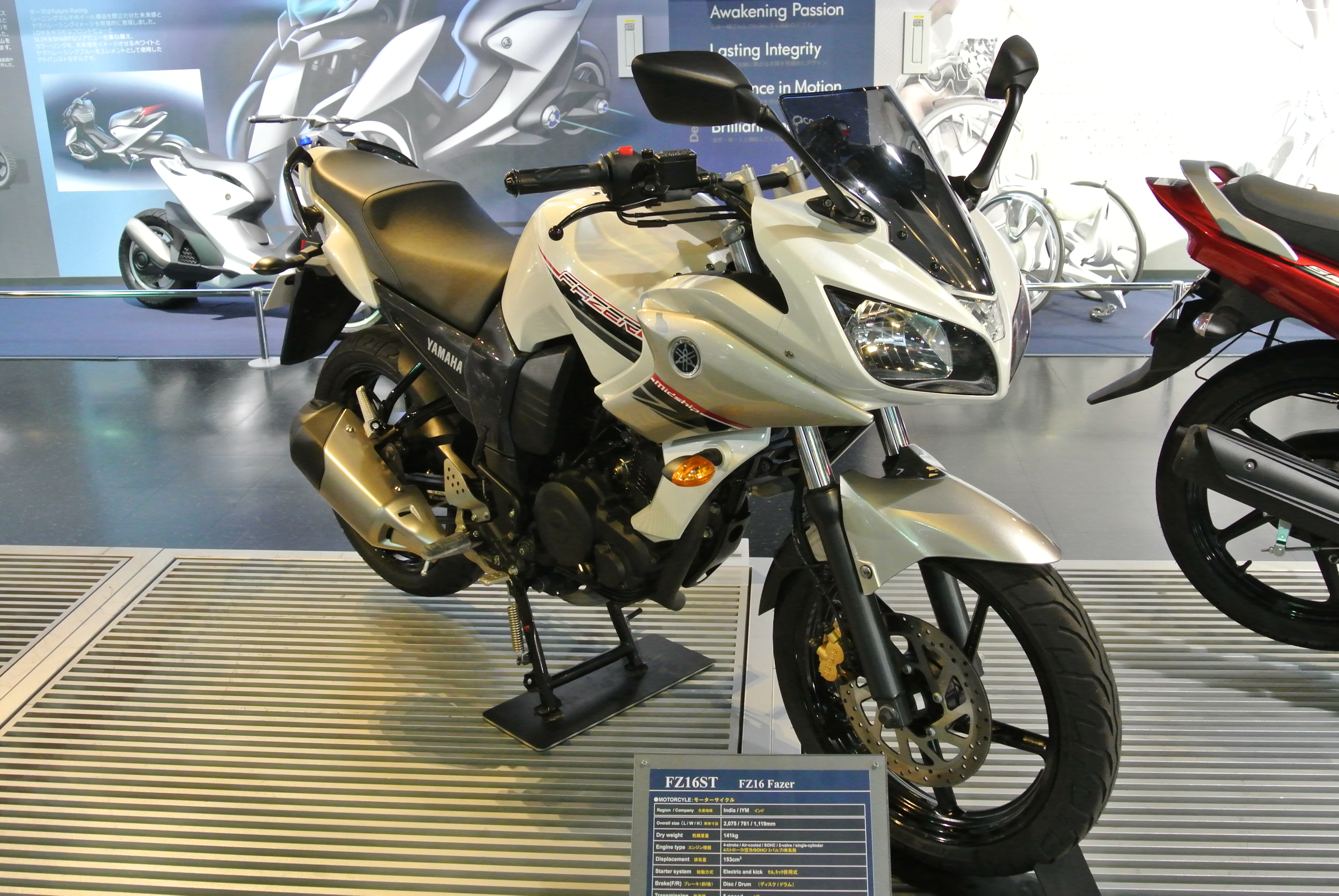
Yamaha FZ16 Fazer

The FZ16 Fazer or FZ16ST is the semi-faired version of the FZ16, similar in manner to the FZ8-S and FZ1-S Fazer. It has twin headlights instead of single, and the riding position has slightly altered to accommodate long-distance riding.

== FZ-S ==
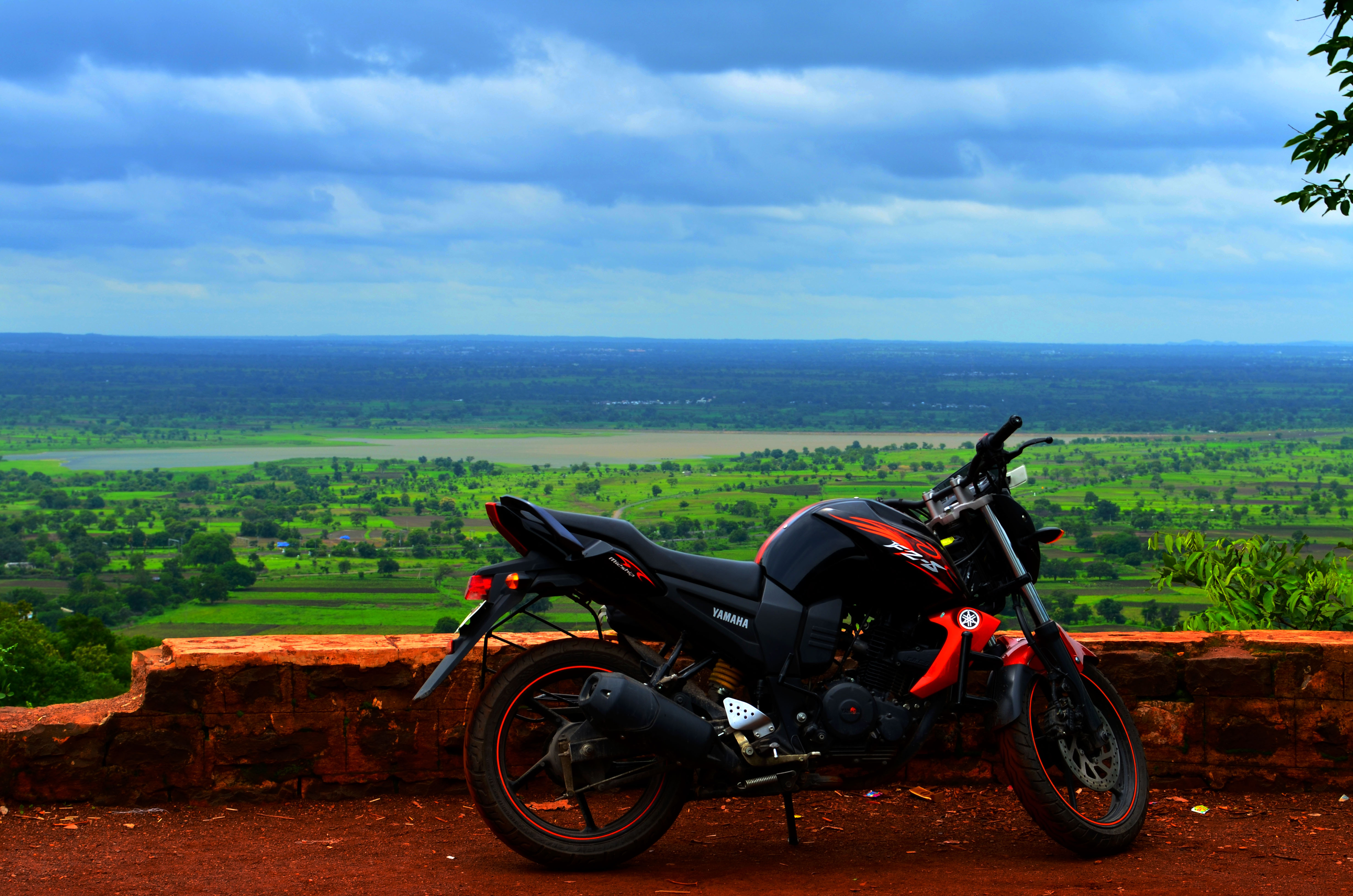
Yamaha FZ-S

The FZ-S is launched after FZ16 with an aerodynamic windshield and additional 45mm in height, both of which are very successful bikes in India.

== FZ-S FI ==
The new FZ series, which consists of the FZ FI and FZS FI models, is powered by a 149 cc, fuel-injected, BS-VI engine that is lighter and has a side stand engine cutoff switch.The body's weight has been decreased from 137 kg to 135 kg, making it easier for riders to navigate and improving their handling comfort. The FZS FI variant also includes the Bluetooth-enabled "Yamaha Motorcycle Connect X," which, among other features, offers various features including "Answer back," "E-lock," "Locate my bike," and "Hazard" alert.
