= Yamaha Diversion =

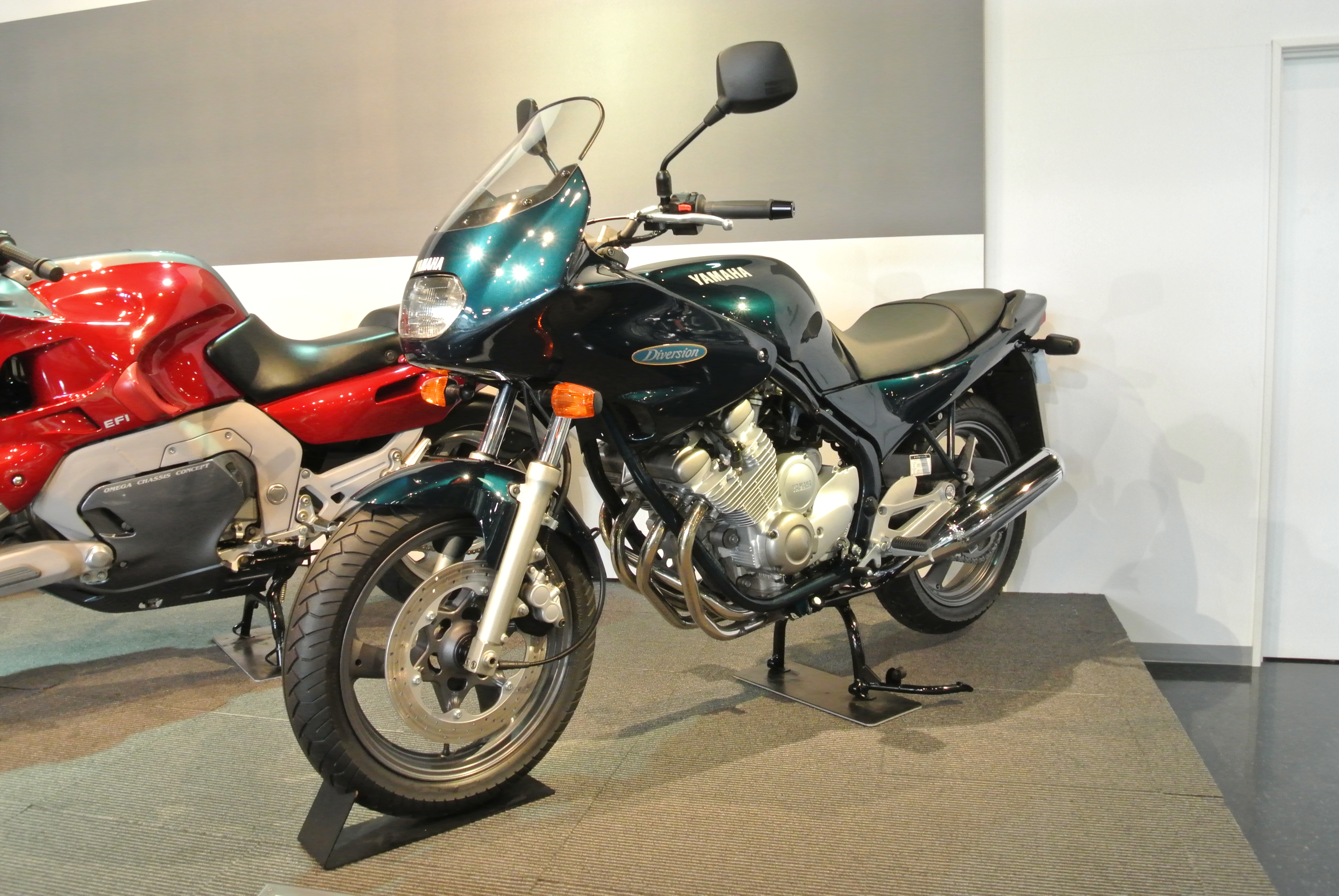
- Manufacturer: Yamaha
- Also called: XJ series
- Predecessor: XJ600
- Successor: FZ6/FZ1
- Engine: 8-valve inline-4

The Yamaha Diversion is a series of all-round touring motorcycles descended from Yamaha's earlier XJ series. Early Diversion models had a four-stroke air-cooled 8-valve inline-four engine. In 2009 the model name was retained for a new range with 16-valve liquid-cooled engines.

== Diversion models ==
Before the introduction of the 2009 models the series consisted of four main models; the XJ600S, XJ600N, XJ900S and XJ900GT and the lesser known YBR125 Diversion.

=== The XJ600S Diversion/Seca II ===
The XJ600S is known as the Diversion in most parts of the world but as the Seca II in the North American and Australian markets. The bike has a small top fairing although a lower fairing is available as an accessory. The XJ600S is a descendant of the XJ600 models manufactured between 1984 and 1991. It is fitted with a 598cc, air-cooled 8-valve inline-four engine producing 61 hp (45 kW) and 55 N⋅m (41 lbf⋅ft). The engine from the original XJ600 model was tuned towards improved low- and midrange power, sacrificing some peak power.

600cc Diversion models were manufactured from 1992 to 2004. US Seca IIs were manufactured from 1992 to 1998. As the Diversion/Seca II design is based on an earlier, well-matured model, changes made to the bike during these years were rather subtle, mostly concerning improvements in fairing: a second front-brake disc and small oil cooler appeared on the 1996 model along with improvements to the carburettors.

The Diversion favours an upright riding position more than most 600cc sport bikes, making it usable for commuting. It remained in production for quite a long time, probably due to its low price, modest fuel consumption, longevity and reliability.

=== The XJ600N ===
The XJ600N is almost identical to the XJ600S except that it is a naked bike and the instrument panel is different, as it turns with the handlebars. This model was not sold in North America.

=== The XJ900S/XJ900GT ===
The XJ900 is a descendant of the earlier XJ900 model. The XJ900S and the XJ900GT are both the same basic motorcycle except the GT, typically for touring motorcycles, has a large fairing and two Krauser K2 panniers while the XJ900S has a small top fairing like the XJ600S. On the dashboard (wider than that of the 600cc models) there are some extra gauges such as a fuel gauge. It is a sports/touring machine fitted with an 892cc, air-cooled 8-valve inline-four engine with 89 hp (66 kW) and 85 N⋅m (63 lbf⋅ft). The XJ900S/GT has a shaft drive while the 600cc models are chain driven.

The XJ900S/GT is known as Diversion 900 on the European market. In the United States the bike appeared as the 1983 Seca XJ900RK.

=== Police versions ===
The Yamaha Diversion has been used as a police motorcycle all over the world. Such models are built by Yamaha to the specifications of individual police departments. Generally the XJ900S is chosen for police use but the XJ600S has also been used. Police specification Diversions are commonly referred to as XJ900P (P for Police) although Yamaha refers to them by their usual model designation (XJ900S or XJ600S) as they do not constitute a separate model.

=== XJ6 Diversion, XJ6 N and XJ6 Diversion F ===
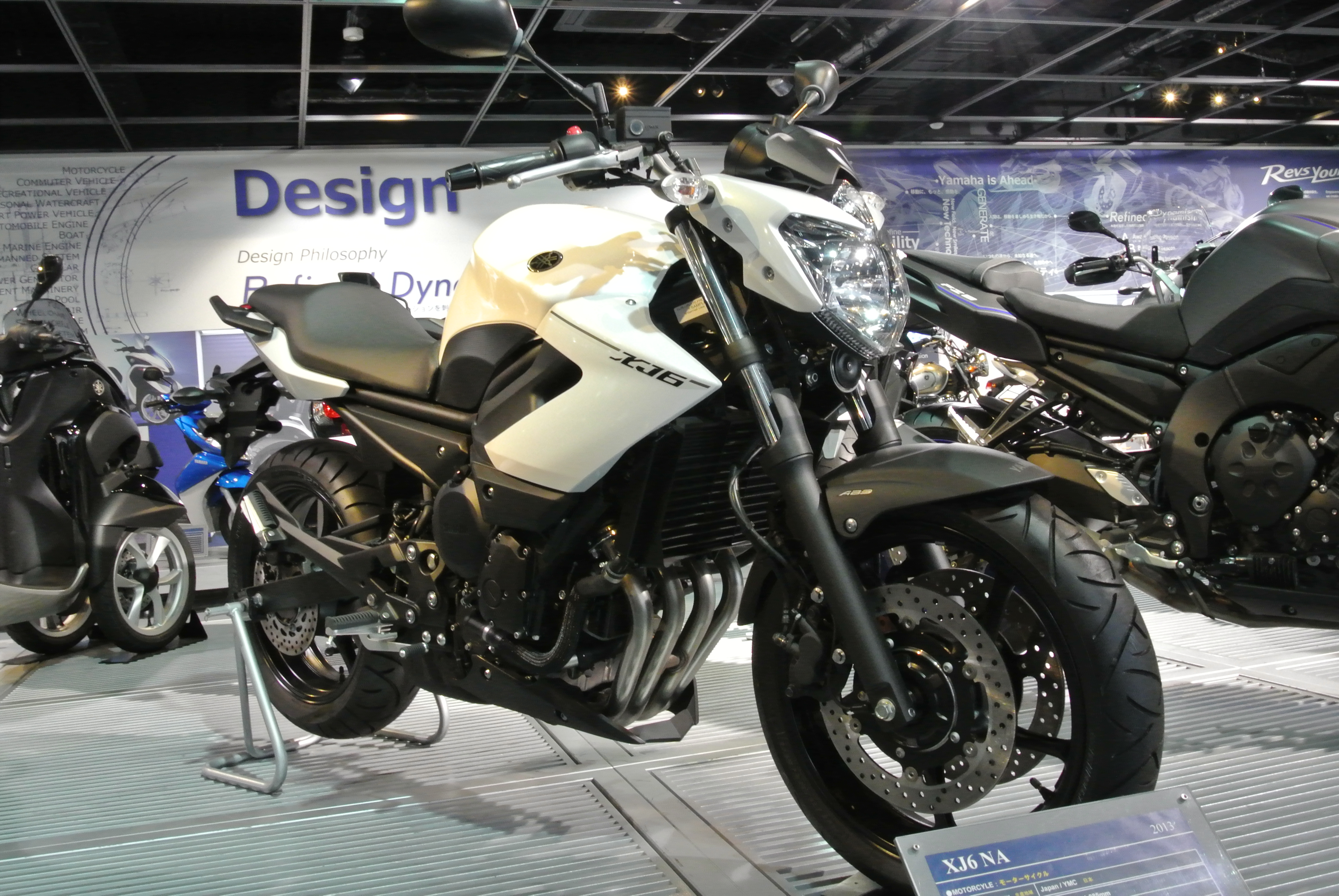
2013 Yamaha XJ6

In 2009 Yamaha re-launched the Diversion line in the form of the XJ6 Diversion, XJ6 N and XJ6 Diversion F. The former has a half-fairing while the N version is a naked motorcycle. The fully faired FZ6R is the American equivalent to the European XJ6 Diversion F model with the exception of not having the ABS and electronic immobilizer. The engine is a detuned Fazer engine and both versions are offered with optional ABS braking. The new line has upgraded to a liquid-cooled 16 valve 4-stroke forward-inclined parallel 4-cylinder engine developing 78 horsepower (57 kW) / 59.7 Nm. Yamaha has kept the engine displacement at 600cc for the new Diversion line.

The YBR125 Diversion was also available in France around 2005.

=== Specifications ===
XJ600N/S

Model Year	1993
Engine type	Air-cooled, DOHC, 8-valves (2-valves/cyl), in-line four
Max power	61 hp (45 kW) @ 8500 rpm
Max torque	51.6 newton-metres (38.1 ft⋅lb) @ 7500 rpm
Fuel capacity	17 litres (4.5 US gal)
Wet weight	216 kilograms (476 lb)
Seat height	775 millimetres (30.5 in)
