= Yamaha XJ600 =

XJ600
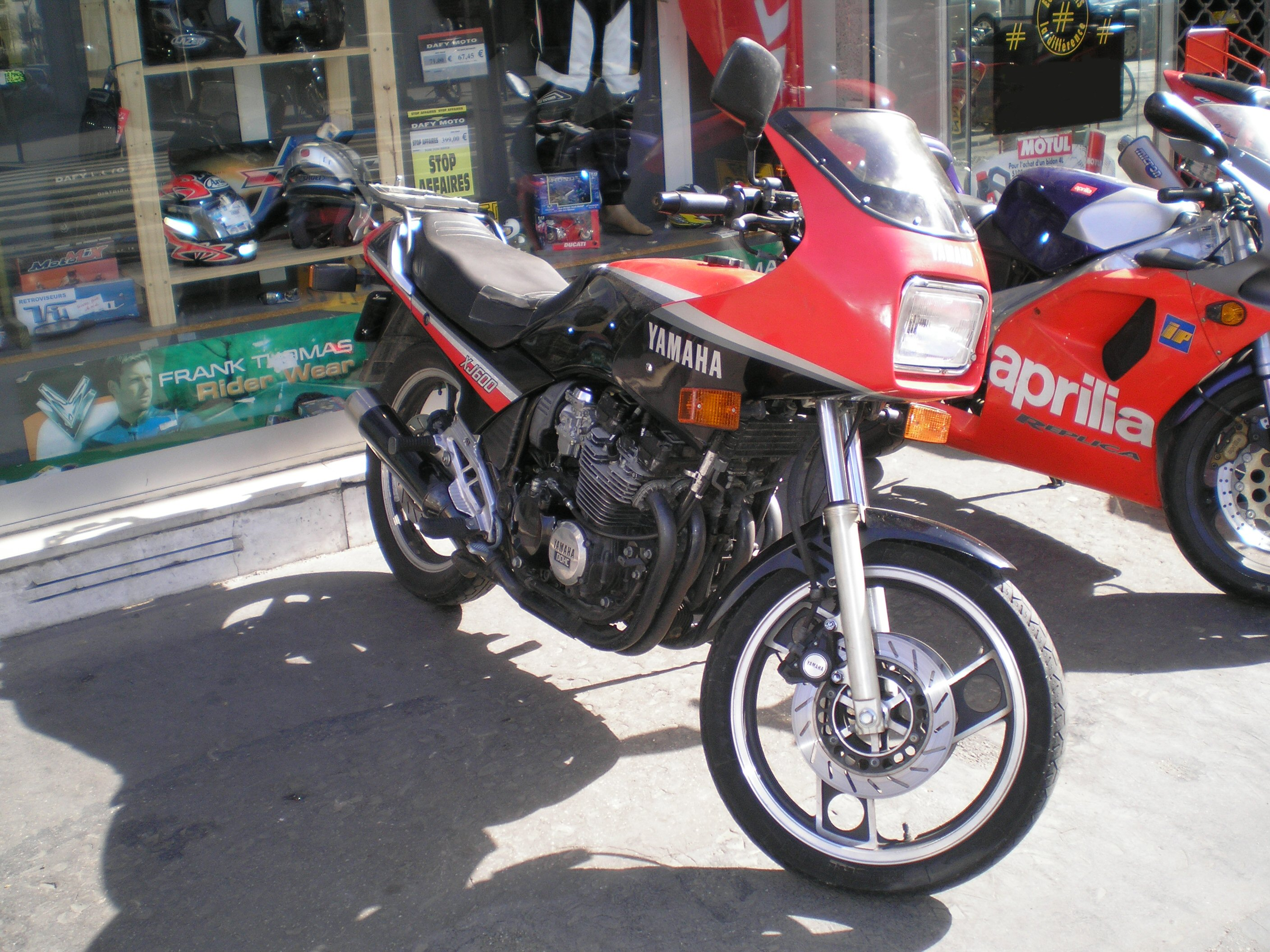
- Manufacturer: Yamaha
- Also called: Yamaha FJ600
- Production: 1984-1991
- Successor: Yamaha Diversion/Seca II
- Class: Standard
- Engine: 598 c.c, air-cooled, DOHC inline-4
- Power: 72 hp / 52.6 kW
- Transmission: 6-speed
- Suspension: telescopic forks mono-shock rear
- Brakes: Front: dual disc Rear: disc
- Tires: Front: 90/90-18, Rear:110/90-18
- Weight: 467 lbs / 212 kg (wet)
- Fuel capacity: 5.3 gallons / 20 liters
- Related: Yamaha XJ900

The Yamaha XJ600 is a motorcycle manufactured by Yamaha. It is a relatively light motorcycle with top half fairing and around 72 bhp (54 kW). The XJ600 was built from 1984 until 1991, when it was replaced with the Yamaha Diversion/Seca II. In North America, the bike was sold as the FJ600. The 1984 Yamaha XJ600 and FJ600 were notable for being the first Japanese inline-4 motorcycles with a displacement of 600cc. They are also one of the first inline-4 motorcycles to use mono-shock rear suspension, e.g., 2 years after the 1982 Kawasaki GPz550 Unitrak.

== Related bikes ==
- Yamaha XJ900, the 900 cc brother of the XJ600.
- Yamaha Diversion/Seca II, the successors of the XJ600/900 series.
