= Yamaha YZF-R15 =

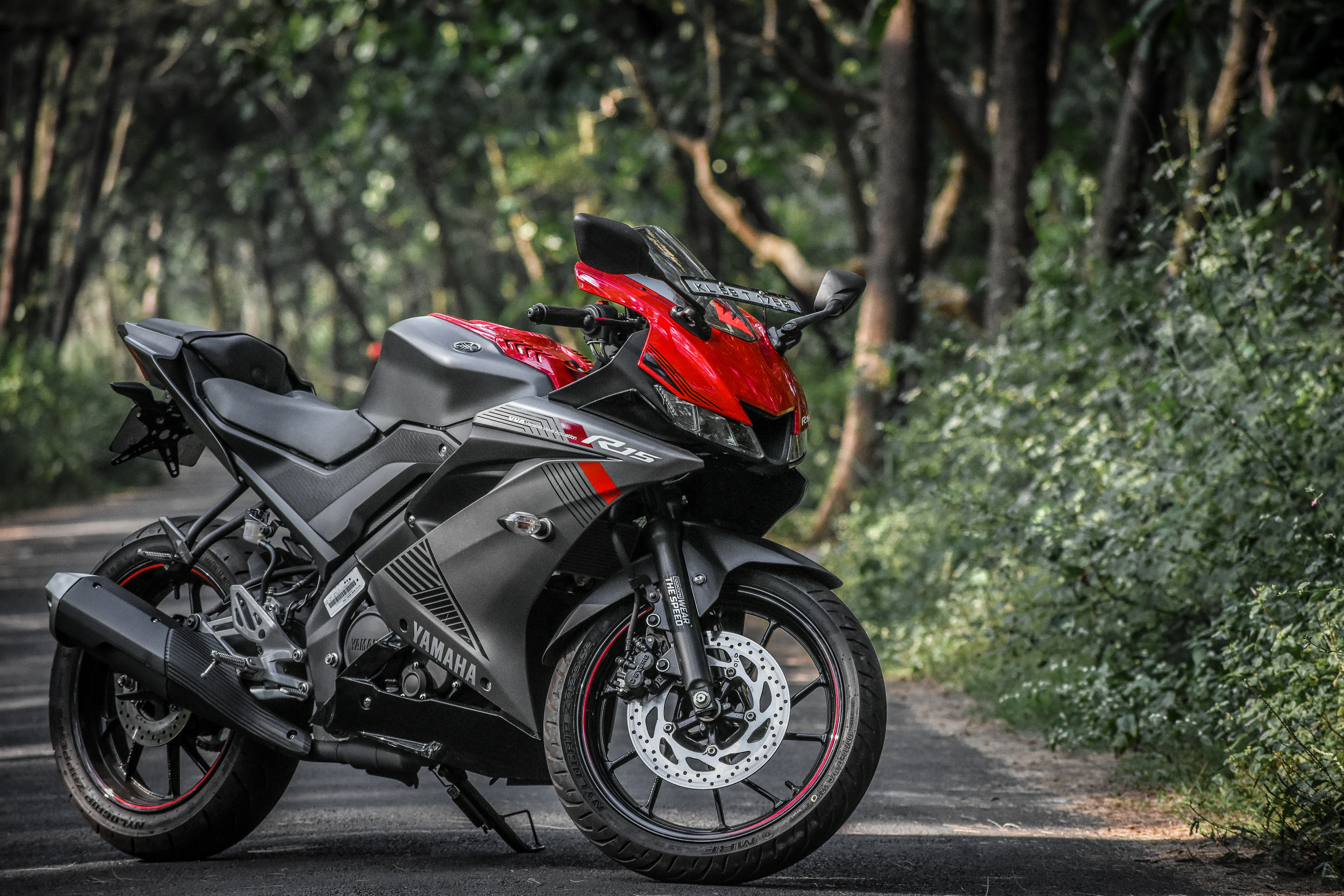
- Manufacturer: Yamaha Motor Company
- Also called: Yamaha R15
- Parent company: Yamaha Corporation
- Production: 2008–present
- Class: Sport bike
- Engine: 149.8 cc (9.14 cu in) liquid-cooled 4-stroke 4-valve SOHC single-cylinder (2008–2017); 155.7 cc (9.50 cu in) liquid-cooled 4-stroke 4-valve SOHC single-cylinder with Variable Valve Actuation (2017–present)
- Bore / stroke: 57.0 mm × 58.7 mm (2.2 in × 2.3 in) (2008–2017); 58.0 mm × 58.7 mm (2.3 in × 2.3 in) (2017–present)
- Compression ratio: 10.4:1 (2008–2017); 11.6:1 (2017–present)
- Transmission: 6-speed constant mesh
- Frame type: Steel twin-spar (Deltabox)
- Suspension: Front: Conventional telescopic fork (2008–2017; India , 2008–present); Inverted telescopic fork (2017–present, except India); Rear: Aluminum swingarm with monoshock
- Brakes: Front: Dual-piston caliper with single 270 mm (10.6 in) disc (2008–2017); Dual-piston caliper with single 282 mm (11.1 in) disc (2017–present); Rear: Single-piston caliper with single 220 mm (8.7 in) disc
- Tires: (2008–2010) Front: 80/90-17; Rear: 100/80-17 (2011–2017) Front: 90/80-17; Rear: 130/70-17 (2017–present) Front: 100/80-17; Rear: 140/70-17
- Rake, trail: 26°, 98 mm (3.9 in); 88 mm (3.5 in) (2017-present)
- Wheelbase: 1,345 mm (53.0 in) (2008–2017); 1,325 mm (52.2 in) (2017–present)
- Dimensions: L: 1,970 mm (78 in) (2008–2011); 1,975 mm (77.8 in) (2011–2017); 1,990 mm (78 in) (2017–present); W: 670 mm (26 in) (2008–2011); 660 mm (26 in) (2011–2017); 725 mm (28.5 in) (2017–present); H: 1,070 mm (42 in) (2008–2017); 1,135 mm (44.7 in) (2017–present)
- Seat height: 800 mm (31 in) (2008–2017); 815 mm (32.1 in) (2017–present)
- Fuel capacity: 12 L (2.6 imp gal; 3.2 US gal) (2008–2017); 11 L (2.4 imp gal; 2.9 US gal) (2017–present)
- Oil capacity: 0.95 L (0.21 imp gal; 0.25 US gal); 0.85 L (0.19 imp gal; 0.22 US gal)
- Related: Yamaha FZ150i; Yamaha YZF-R Series

The Yamaha YZF-R15 is a single-cylinder sport bike made by Yamaha Motor Company in 2008. In September 2011, the second iteration, called v2.0, was released in India, and in April 2014 it was released in Indonesia. In January 2017, the bike's third iteration, v3.0, was launched in Indonesia. in September 2021, the fourth iteration, v4.0, was also launched in India.

== Specifications ==
The engine for the first and second iteration (v2.0) was a 149.5 cc single cylinder four-stroke engine with four valves and a single overhead camshaft. The bore and stroke were 57.0 mm × 58.7 mm (2.24 in × 2.31 in). This engine had a claimed 12.2 kW (16.4 hp) of power at 8,500 rpm and 14.5 N⋅m (10.7 lbf⋅ft) of torque at 7,500 rpm. The radiator is placed in the front of the engine with a fan behind it. The coolant reserve is on the left side up and behind the radiator. The transmission is a return type six-speed with a constant mesh wet multi-plate clutch.

For the first and second iteration, the bike had a 270 mm (11 in) single disc with dual piston calipers in the front and a 220 mm single disc single piston caliper at the rear, both the brake systems being made by Nissin of Japan. The front suspension was a twin telescopic fork, and the rear is a linked type of single shock suspension. The bike has dual headlights like the other bikes of the YZF-R series.

For the 2017 update, the bike now has a new 155.1 cc engine. The bore and stroke are 58.0 mm × 58.7 mm (2.28 in × 2.31 in). This engine also gets Variable Valve Actuation (VVA) technology and has a claimed 14.2 kW (19.0 hp) of power at 10,000 rpm and 14.7 N⋅m (10.8 lbf⋅ft) of torque at 8,500 rpm. The front disc is larger than the previous iteration, with a measured 282 mm (11.1 in). The front suspension is now an inverted twin telescopic fork. This iteration also features assist and slipper clutch.

== v2.0 ==
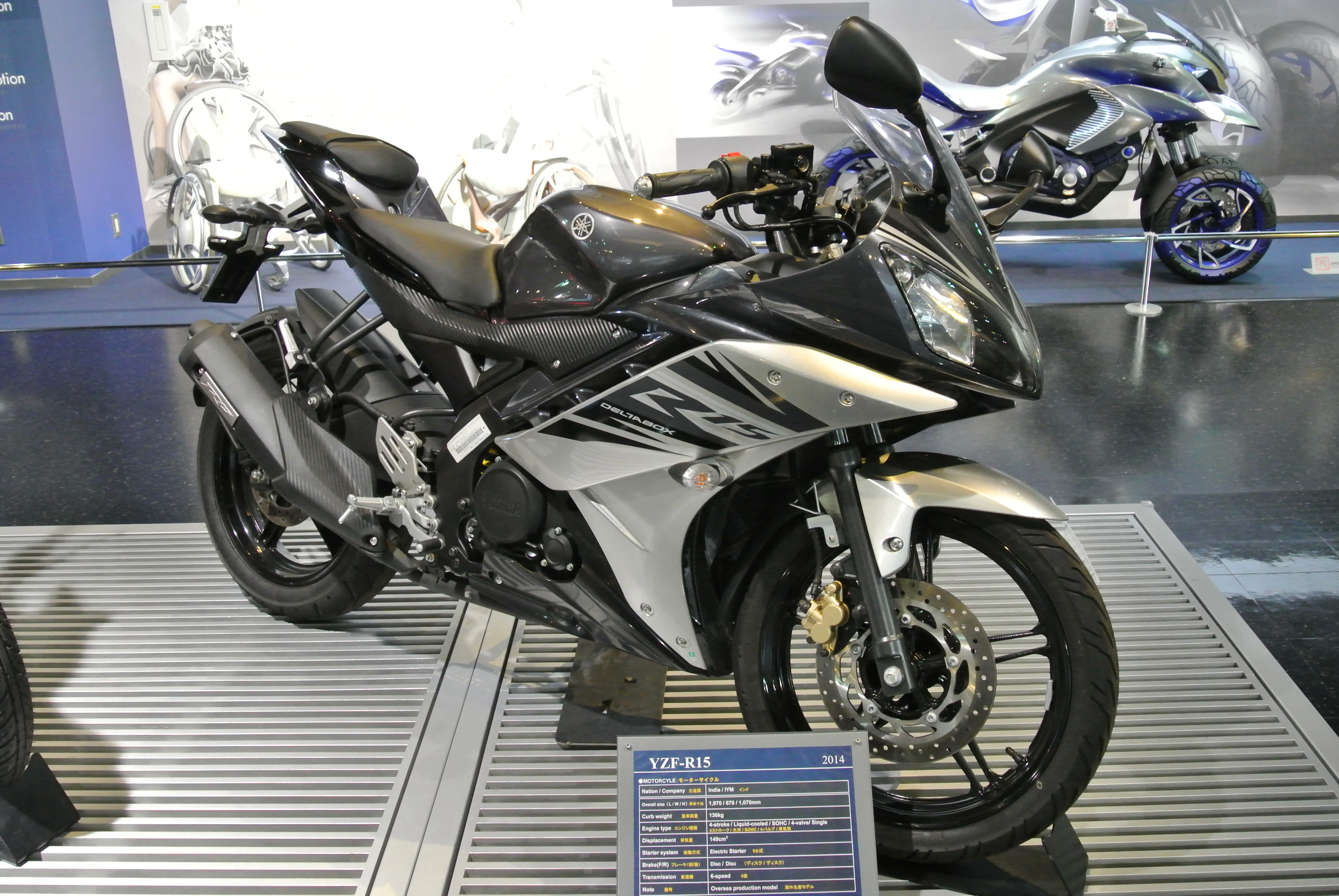
YZF-R15 v2.0

The YZF-R15 v2.0 had undergone changes as compared to the previous version in the cases of the engine control unit (ECU), swingarm, drivetrain unit, split-seat design, higher seat height, LED taillight, wider tires, larger gear ratio (15/47), longer wheelbase, rear mudguard, and redesigned middle and tail section. The engine performance was largely similar, still having a six-speed transmission and a linked type of single shock suspension added on the back.

In India, another variation of the YZF-R15 v2.0 was also introduced, named YZF-R15S. This model is largely similar to standard YZF-R15 v2.0 except for a flatter single seat, different tail lamp and rear mudguard.

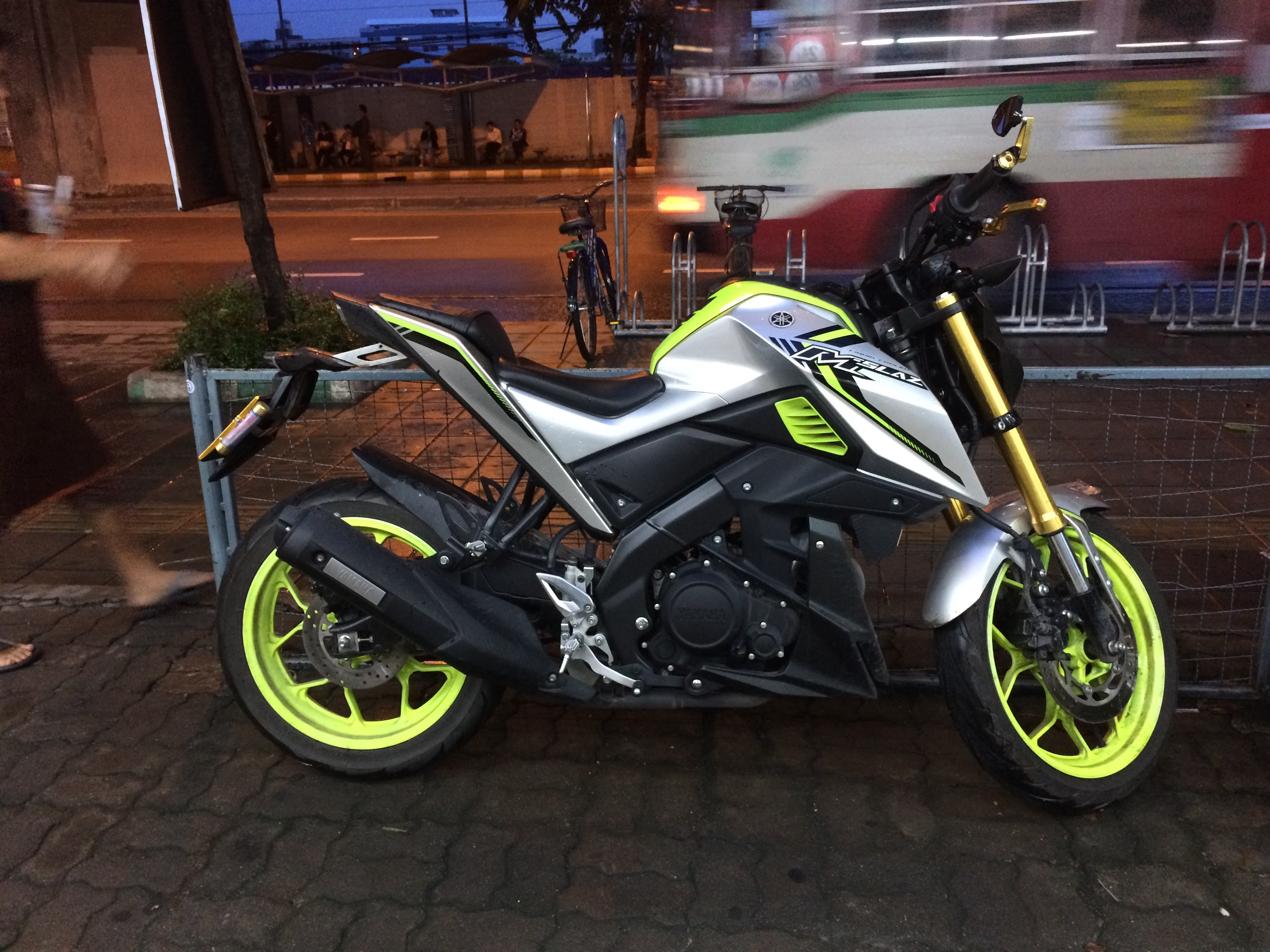
Yamaha M-Slaz

An unfaired, or streetfighter/naked bike, variation of the YZF-R15 v2.0, called the M-Slaz (also called Xabre in Indonesia; TFX 150 in the Philippines and Vietnam), is made in Thailand, Indonesia, and Vietnam.The Yamaha YZF-R15 Version 2.0 is a sportbike that was launched by Yamaha in 2011. It is the second iteration of the R15 series and brought several improvements over the first version. Here are the key features and specifications of the R15 Version 2.0:

=== Key Features ===
==== Design and Styling ====
The R15 V2.0 features a more aggressive and angular design compared to its predecessor, with sharper lines and a more aerodynamic fairing. The front end includes a dual headlamp design, which was a significant update over the single headlamp in the first version.

==== Engine ====
It is powered by a 149cc, single-cylinder, liquid-cooled, 4-stroke, SOHC engine. The engine produces around 17 hp at 8,500 rpm and 15 Nm of torque at 7,500 rpm. The R15 Version 2.0 did not come with Yamaha's VVA(Variable Valve actuation) technology and only had a 2 lobed cam, one for the intake and the other for the exhaust.

==== Performance ====
The R15 V2.0 is known for its excellent handling and cornering capabilities, owing to its lightweight chassis and low center of gravity. The top speed is typically around 130-135 km/h, depending on the road and conditions.

==== Suspension ====
The front features telescopic forks, and the rear uses a linked monoshock unit, it used a set of linkages connected to the swingarm and monoshock providing a balance between comfort and performance.

==== Braking System ====
It comes with a front disc brake (267 mm) and a rear disc brake (220 mm), offering good stopping power. The R15v2 never came with any sorts of ABS(Anti-Lock braking system).

==== Body and Dimensions ====
The bike weighs around 136 kg (kerb weight). The fuel tank capacity is 12 liters, with approximately 2.5 liters reserved for fuel. The wheelbase is around 1,345 mm, providing stability and better cornering performance.

==== Technology ====
The R15 V2.0 features an analog-digital instrument cluster, which provides information such as speed, fuel gauge, trip meter, overheating indicator, MIL(Malfunction Indicator Light, which also worked a diagnostic code indicator), analog tachometer, etc. It also has a fully faired design, which aids in reducing wind resistance during high-speed riding.

==== Improvements Over the Previous Version ====
The R15 Version 2.0 introduced a revised fairing design, improved ergonomics, a more aggressive riding stance, and better overall handling due to improved suspension setup and weight distribution. And the biggest changes were in the rear of the bike, now featuring a proper sporty tail with a LED taillight, along with a cast aluminum swingarm with wider tires.

==== Target Audience ====
The Yamaha R15 Version 2.0 was designed primarily for enthusiasts who were looking for a high-performance 150cc motorcycle with sports styling. It has been popular among young riders, especially in markets like India and Southeast Asia, where it's often used both for commuting and spirited riding.

== v3.0 ==
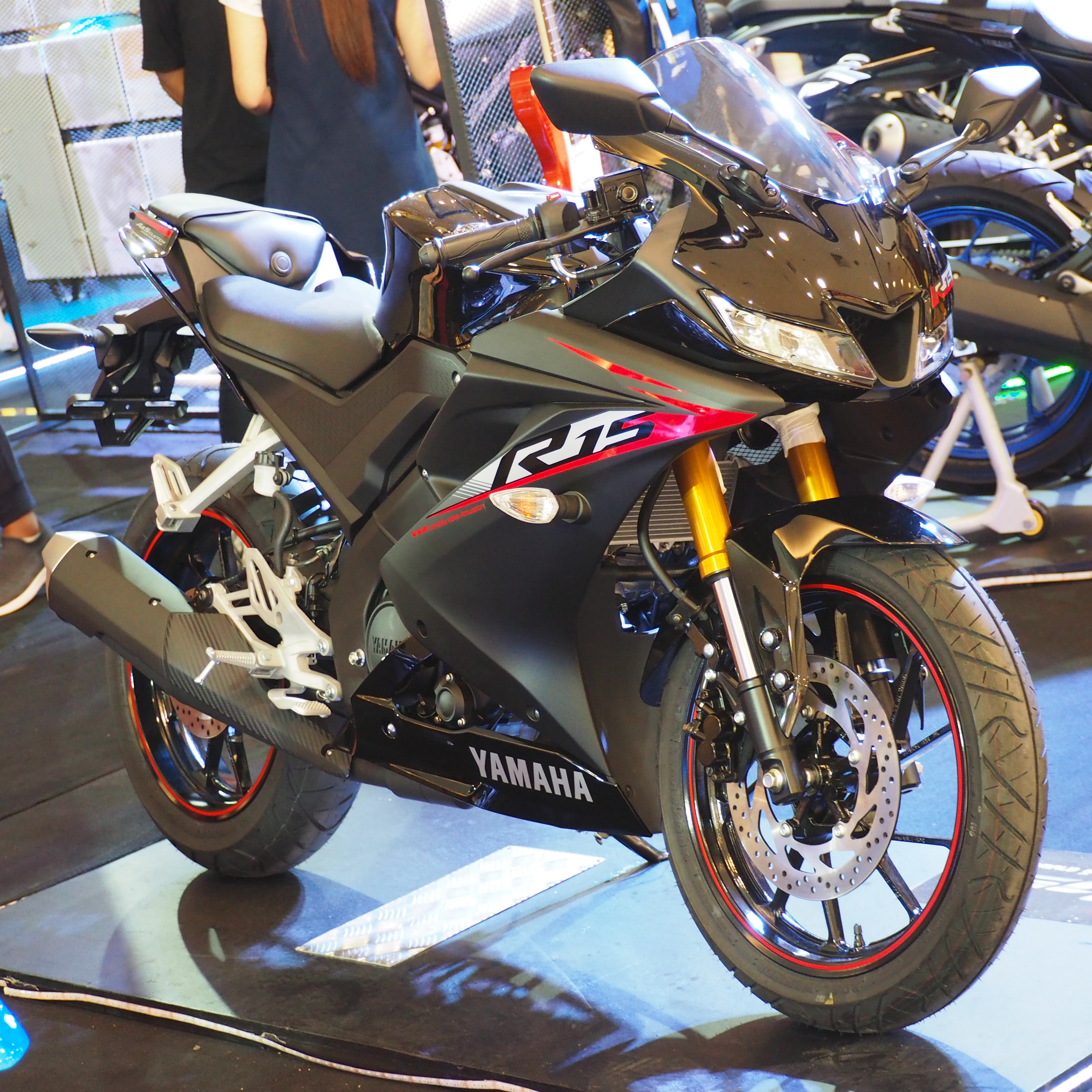
YZF-R15 v3.0

The v3.0 has undergone changes as compared to the previous version in the cases of the updated bodywork and engine, now features VVA technology, assist and slipper clutch, hazard lamp, inverted front suspension fork, all-LED lighting system, full LCD planimeter with shift indicator and wider tyres.

A streetfighter variation of the YZF-R15 v3.0, called the MT-15, was launched in Thailand on 6 October 2018, Indonesia on 18 January 2019, Vietnam on 7 March 2019 and India on 8 January 2018

The Indian version of the MT-15 uses a conventional telescopic fork instead of inverted type with the rest of the motorcycle being unchanged.

The retro-styled naked variation of the YZF-R15 v3.0, called the XSR 155, was launched in Thailand on 16 August 2019.

The YZF-R15S based on the v3.0 model was launched on 17 November 2021.

== v4.0 ==
Yamaha R15 v4.0

The YZF-R15 v4.0 was introduced in India on 21 September 2021. The flagship variant called YZF-R15M is also available.

The R15 V4 features Traction Control (TCR) and Quick-shifter though the R15 V3 doesn't. The Yamaha R15 V4 sits on the Deltabox frame, a design that is based on technologies garnered from the YZR500 GP competition machines. The frame adopts a box-shaped cross-section that enables a larger cross-section surface area, lighter weight and high rigidity.
