= Yamaha FZS600 Fazer =

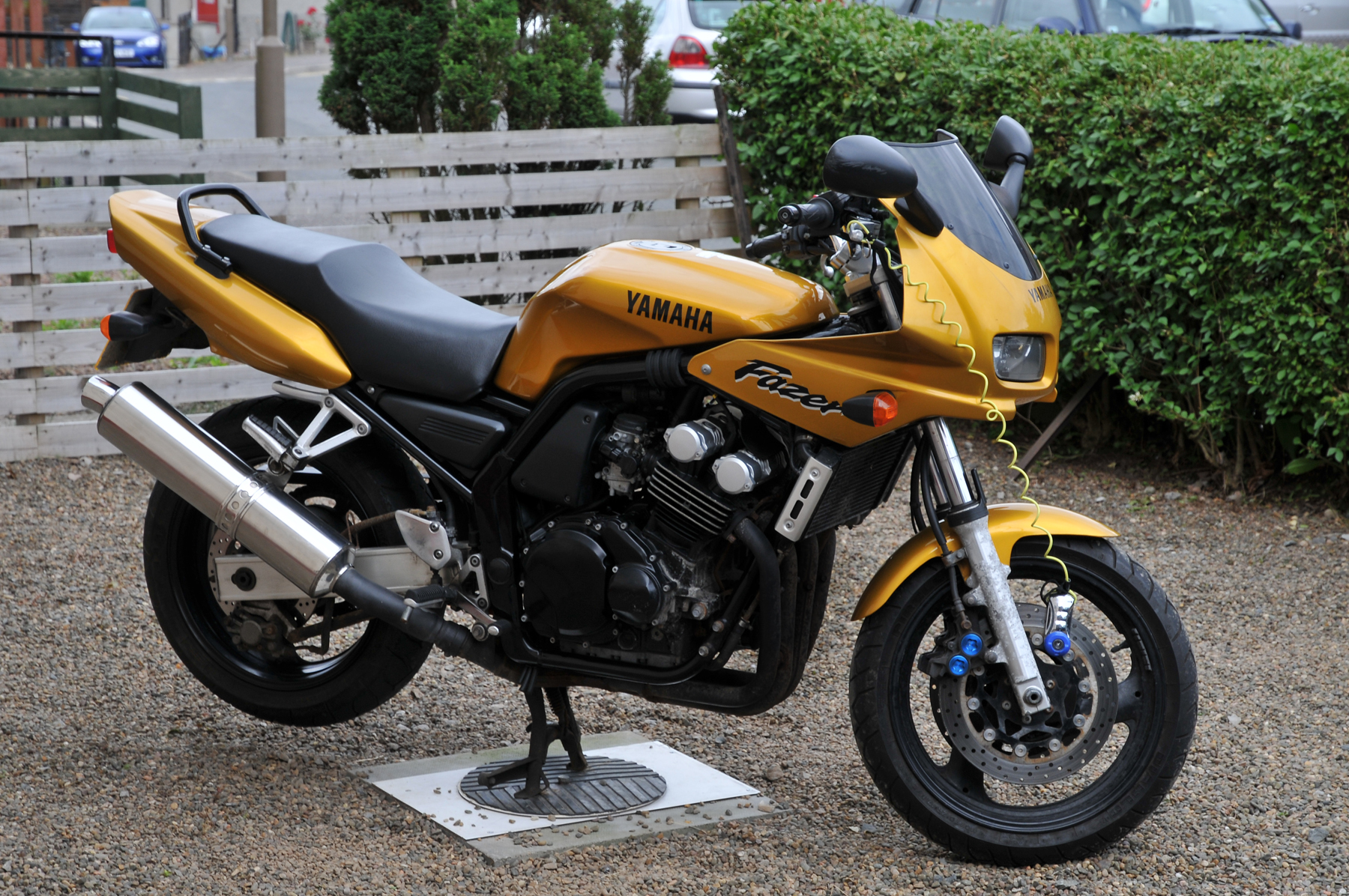
- FZS600 Fazer
- Manufacturer: Yamaha
- Successor: Yamaha FZ6 Fazer
- Engine: 599 cc liquid cooled DOHC 16 valve inline-four
- Bore / stroke: 62.0 mm × 49.6 mm (2.44 in × 1.95 in)
- Compression ratio: 12:1
- Top speed: 135 mph (217 km/h)
- Power: 95 hp (70.8 kW) (claimed)
- Torque: 45 lb⋅ft (61 N⋅m) (claimed)
- Ignition type: Transistorised Coil Ignition
- Transmission: Six speed manual, chain final drive
- Frame type: Tubular steel double cradle
- Suspension: Front telescopic forks; rear swingarm with single shock absorber
- Brakes: Front: Twin 298 mm (11.7 in) disc brakes; Rear: 245 mm (9.6 in) disc brake
- Tyres: Front: 110/70 ZR17 (54 W); Rear: 160/60 ZR17 (69 W)
- Rake, trail: 24°, 88 mm (3.5 in)
- Wheelbase: 1,415 mm (55.7 in)
- Dimensions: L: 2,080 mm (82 in); W: 710 mm (28 in); H: 1,170 mm (46 in)
- Seat height: 790 mm (31 in)
- Weight: 189 kg (417 lb) (dry)
- Fuel capacity: 18 L (4.0 imp gal; 4.8 US gal); 20 L (4.4 imp gal; 5.3 US gal) MY2000 onwards
- Fuel consumption: 55 mpg_{‑imp} (5.1 L/100 km; 46 mpg_{‑US})
- Turning radius: 2,900 mm (110 in)
- Related: Yamaha FZ Series; Yamaha YZF600R; Yamaha FZS1000

The Yamaha FZS600 Fazer is a sport motorcycle produced by Yamaha between 1998 and 2004. It is the predecessor of the Yamaha FZ6. During its production run, it underwent several changes before being discontinued in 2004 due to European emissions laws coming into force.

The FZS600 was first unveiled at the Paris Auto Show in 1997, and shares parts from other Yamaha models, notably the engine from the YZF600R Thundercat, detuned to give more mid-range power, and the front discs and blue-dot calipers from the YZF-R1. Revisions for the 2002 model saw a newer more modern styled fairing similar to the FZS1000 Fazer. This used a newer and better headlight design, an often mentioned criticism of the launch bike. The Fazer is a well reviewed motorcycle that is generally considered reliable although many owners have reported problems caused by a weak front sprocket nut. Yamaha has since issued a redesigned thicker nut (12 mm vs 9 mm) to counteract the issue.

== Model history ==
- 1998: Yamaha FZS600 Fazer launched. Model number 5DM1.
- 1999: Model number 5DM4.
- 2000: Yamaha FZS600 Fazer S Introduced, with several minor changes including larger fuel tank, improved pillion comfort and preload adjustment on front shocks. Model number 5DM7.
- 2001: Several cosmetic changes, including carbon look instrument panel and painted fork sliders. Model number 5DMC for FZS600 and 5DMF for FZS600S.

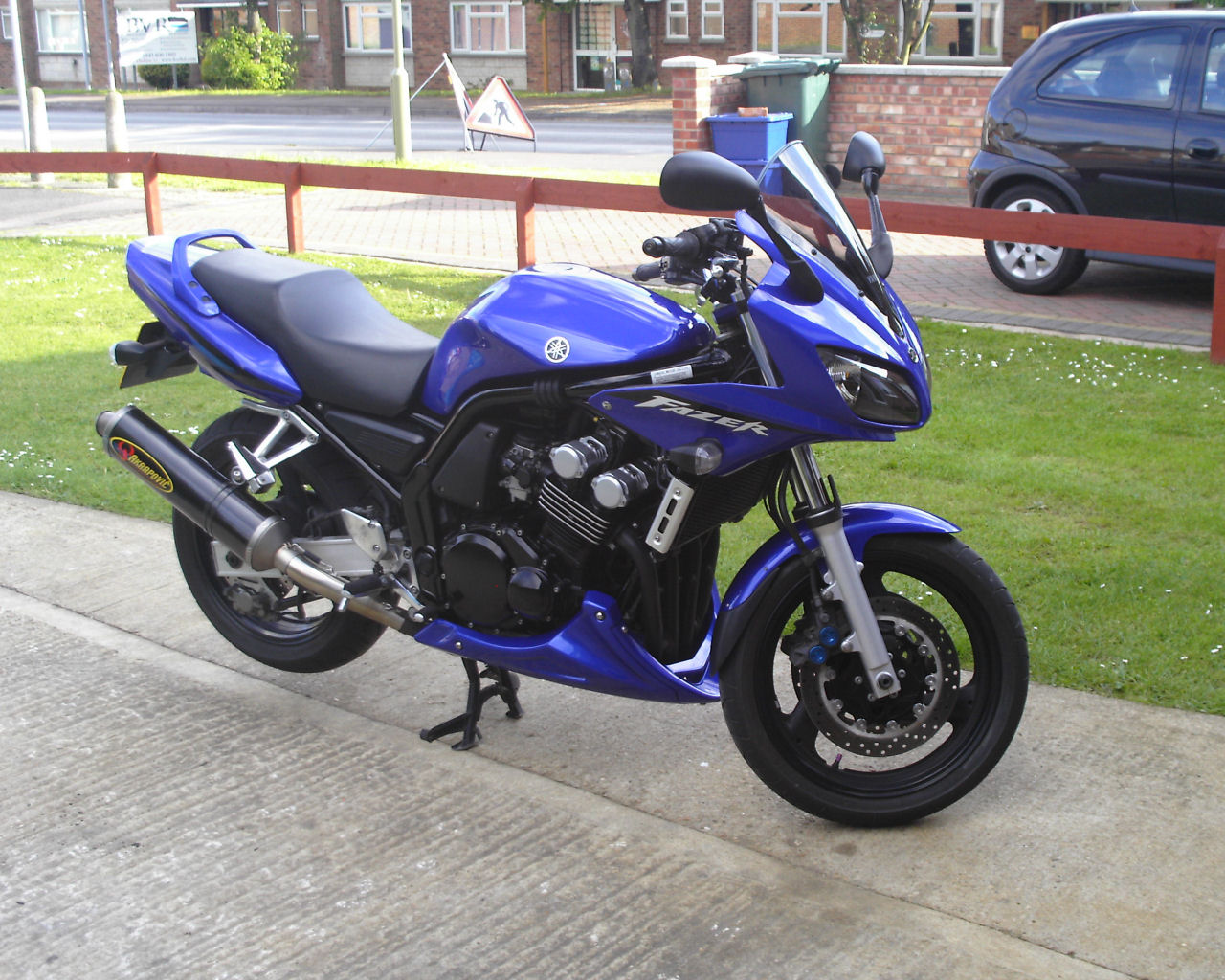
2003 Yamaha FZS600 Fazer "Fox eye" in blue (note: fitted with an official Yamaha bellypan)

- 2002: Yamaha FZS600 Fazer New front fairing design, nicknamed "Foxeye". Improvements included new fairing design similar to the FZS1000, sculpted tank and new instrument panel. Model number 5RT1.
- 2004: Yamaha FZS600 Fazer discontinued due to Euro-2 emissions laws, which the bike failed to pass.
