= Yamaha FZ150i =

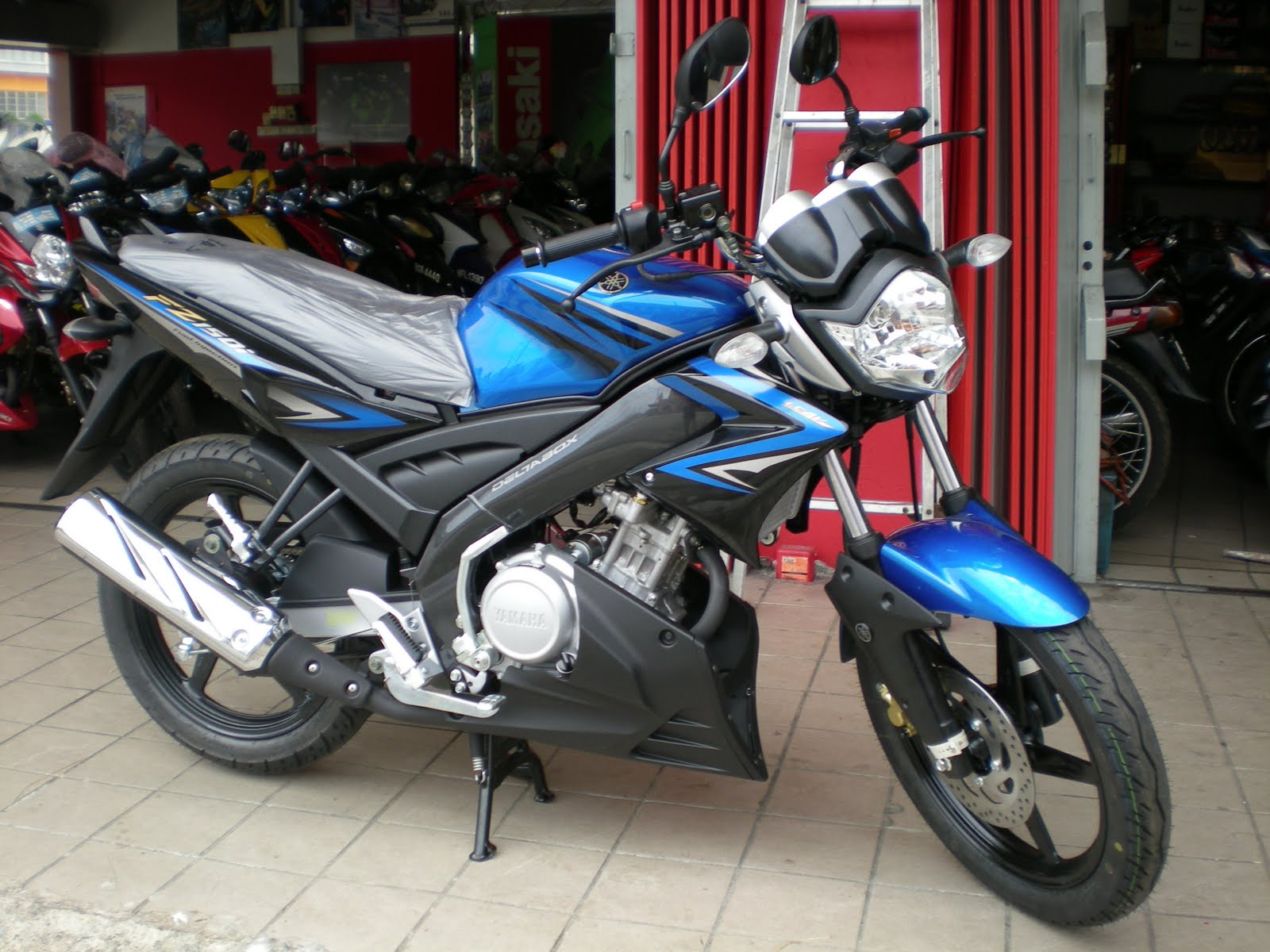
- Yamaha FZ150i
- Manufacturer: Yamaha Motor Company
- Also called: Yamaha V-Ixion (Indonesia)
- Parent company: Yamaha Corporation
- Production: 2007–2018 (Global); 2007-present (Indonesia)
- Predecessor: Yamaha RX-Z
- Successor: Yamaha MT-15
- Class: Standard
- Related: Yamaha FZ Series; Yamaha YZF-R15

The Yamaha FZ150i (called V-Ixion/Vixion in Indonesia) is a lightweight 150 cc motorcycle manufactured by Yamaha Motor Company exclusively for Southeast Asian markets. It was launched in Indonesia in June 2007 at Palembang Indah Mall, Palembang and then Malaysia in January 2008 at First World Hotel, Genting Highlands as the first completely knocked down (CKD) bike to be fuel-injected in Asian motorcycle market.

== Marketing ==
In Malaysia, the FZ150i is locally assembled at the Hong Leong Yamaha (HLY) plant at Sungai Buloh, Selangor. According to HLY website, this model is expected to be sold by 500 units a month after the first year of its introduction. Apart from Indonesia and Malaysia, the FZ150i is also available in other Asian countries such as in Philippines, Singapore and Vietnam.

== Model updates ==
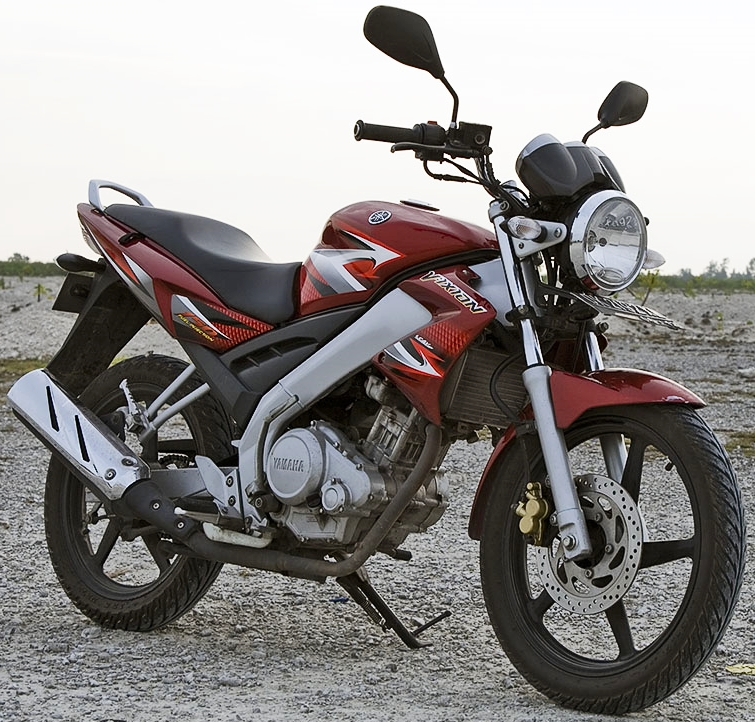
Yamaha V-Ixion

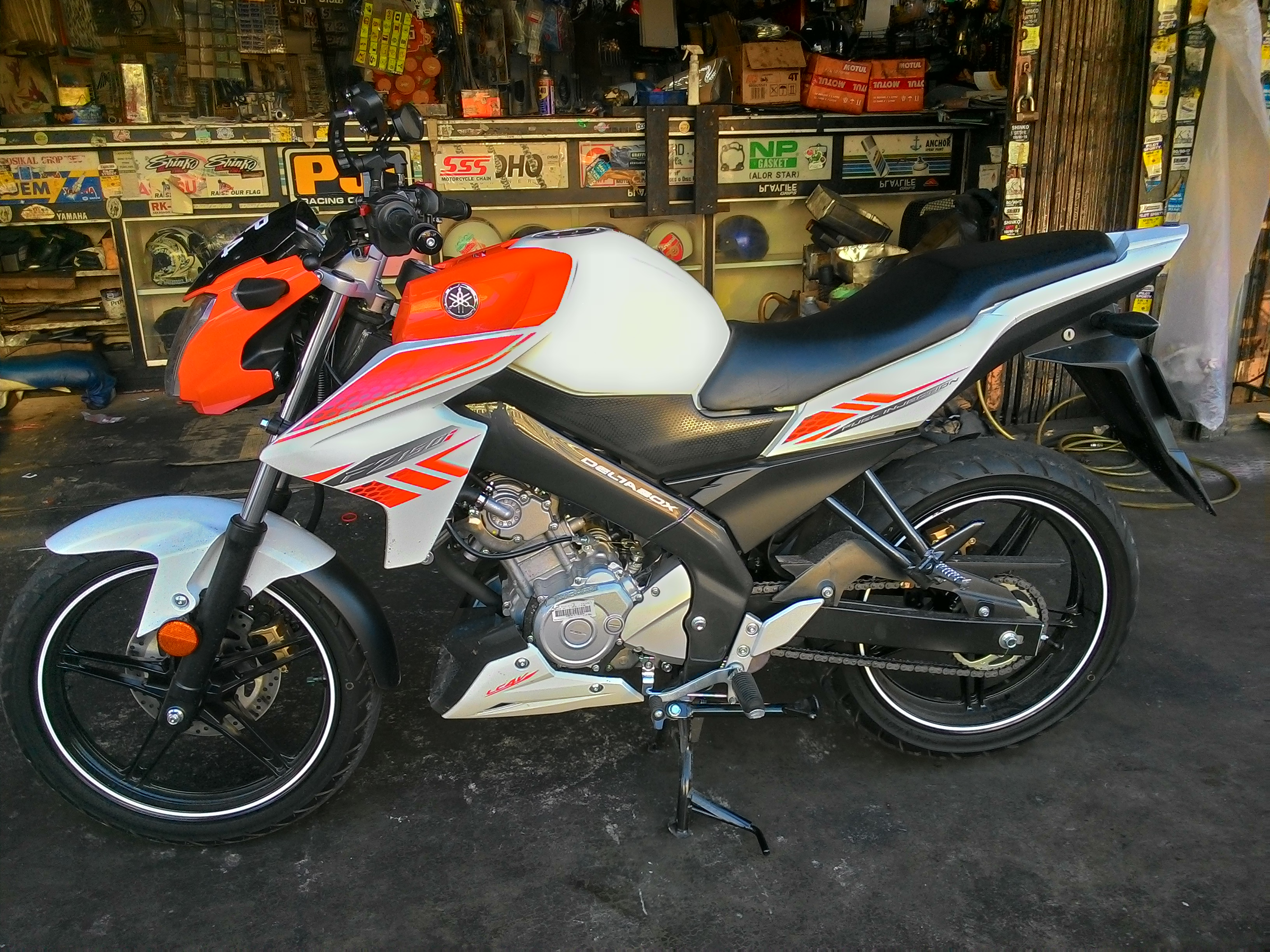
2014 FZ150i

The updated version of the FZ150i was launched in Indonesia as V-Ixion Lightning in 2013 and in Malaysia in April 2014. The engine is upgraded to produce 12.2 kW (16.3 hp) @ 8,500 rpm with 14.4 N⋅m (10.6 lb⋅ft) of torque at 7,500 rpm. An oxygen sensor was added to the exhaust port of the engine. The front and rear tires were upgraded with Dunlop D102A 90/80-17 at the front and 120/70-17 at the rear, mated with star-shaped 5-spoke alloy wheels. Rear braking is improved by using a Nissin single piston calliper with 200 mm disc. It has a grab bar for pillion is positioned under the side rear body of the bike.

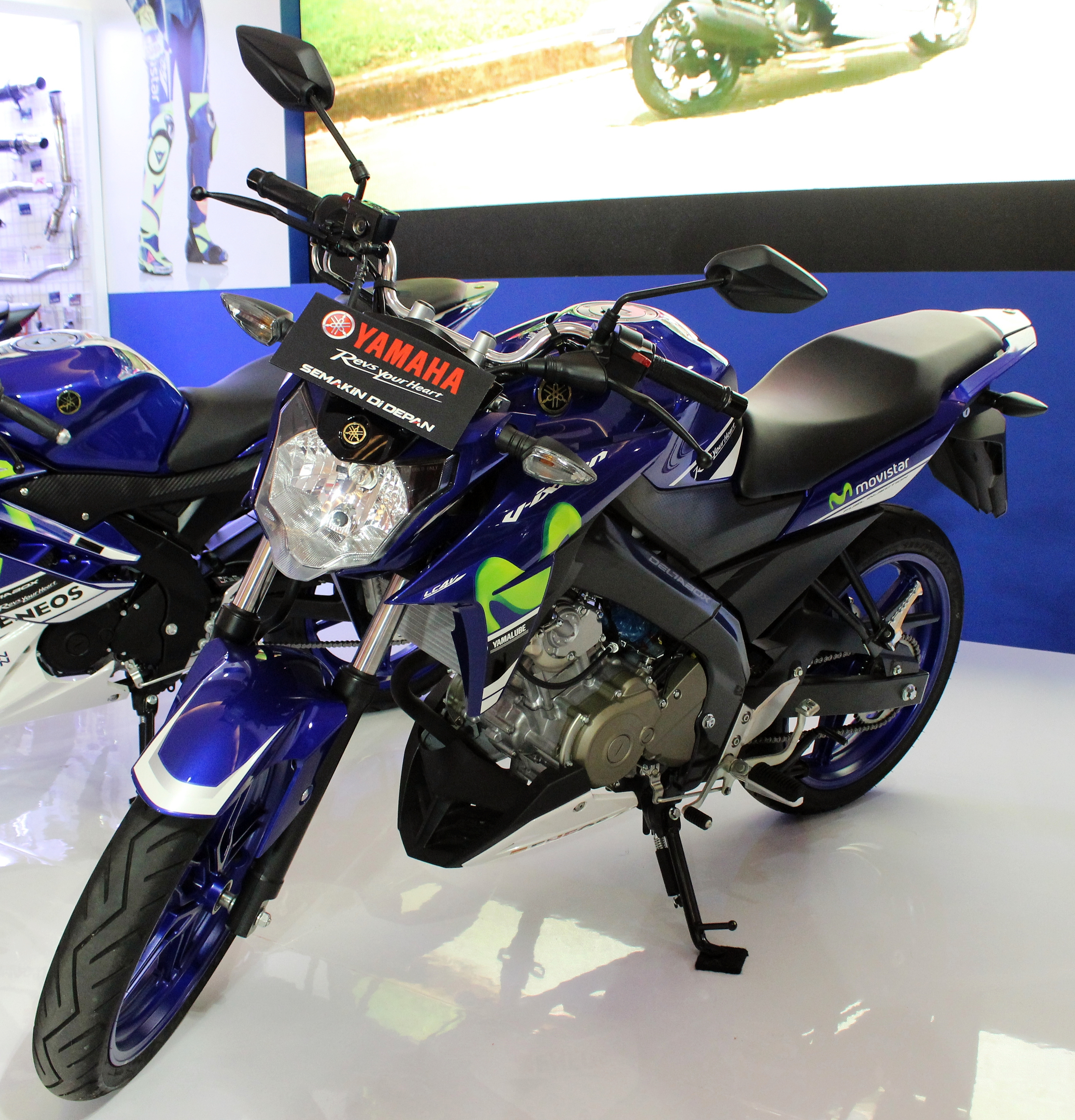
Yamaha V-Ixion Advance (Indonesia)

In late 2015, the bike had some minor changes including the redesigned headlamp and instrument panels, shorter rear fender, and a Euro 3 compliant exhaust system. This model is known as V-Ixion Advance in Indonesia.

The 2017 update of the FZ150i/V-Ixion was revealed at the 2017 Indonesia International Motor Show, Jakarta in late April 2017. It has a completely different bodywork compared to the previous model. This version has 2 variants:

- Standard V-Ixion which used the same engine, frame, transmission, wheels, and rear swingarm as the previous version. This version also adds assist and slipper clutch as a standard equipment.
- V-Ixion R which shared the same engine, frame, transmission, wheels, and rear swingarm with the 2017 version of the YZF-R15. The engine produces a claimed 14.2 kW (19.0 hp) @ 10,000 rpm with 14.7 N⋅m (10.8 lbf⋅ft) of torque at 8,500 rpm. This variant has a wider rear tire and longer wheelbase compared to the standard version.

== Specifications ==
| Specification | 2007–2013 | 2013–2017 | 2017–2018 |
Engine & transmission
| Layout | 4-stroke 4-valve SOHC single-cylinder | | 4-stroke 4-valve SOHC single-cylinder (V-Ixion); 4-stroke 4-valve SOHC single-cylinder with Variable Valve Actuation (V-Ixion R) |
| Capacity | 149.8 cc (9.14 cu in) | | 149.8 cc (9.14 cu in) (V-Ixion); 155.1 cc (9.46 cu in) (V-Ixion R) |
| Bore × stroke | 57.0 mm × 58.7 mm (2.24 in × 2.31 in) | | 57.0 mm × 58.7 mm (2.24 in × 2.31 in) (V-Ixion); 58.0 mm × 58.7 mm (2.28 in × 2.31 in) (V-Ixion R) |
| Compression ratio | 10.4:1 | | 10.4:1 (V-Ixion); 11.6 ± 0.4:1 (V-Ixion R) |
| Cooling system | Liquid-cooled | | |
| Carburation | Fuel injection | | |
| Starter | Electric and kick | | Electric and kick (V-Ixion); Electric (V-Ixion R) |
| Max. power | 11.1 kW (14.9 hp) @ 8,500 rpm | 12.2 kW (16.4 hp) @ 8,500 rpm | 12.2 kW (16.4 hp) @ 8,500 rpm (V-Ixion); 14.2 kW (19.0 hp) @ 10,000 rpm (V-Ixion R) |
| Max. torque | 13.1 N⋅m (9.7 lbf⋅ft) @ 7,500 rpm | 14.5 N⋅m (10.7 lbf⋅ft) @ 7,500 rpm | 14.5 N⋅m (10.7 lbf⋅ft) @ 7,500 rpm (V-Ixion); 14.7 N⋅m (10.8 lbf⋅ft) @ 8,500 rpm (V-Ixion R) |
| Transmission | 5-speed constant mesh, wet-type multi-plate clutch | | 5-speed constant mesh, wet-type multi-plate with assist/slipper clutch (V-Ixion); 6-speed constant mesh, wet-type multi-plate with assist/slipper clutch (V-Ixion R) |
| Final drive | Chain | | |
Cycle parts & suspension
| Frame | Steel twin-spar (Deltabox) | | |
| Front suspension | Conventional telescopic fork | | |
| Front tyre | 2.75-17 (41P) | 90/80-17M/C (46P) | |
| Front brakes | Single 245 mm (9.6 in) disc brake with 2-piston caliper | | Single 245 mm (9.6 in) disc brake with 2-piston caliper (V-Ixion); Single 282 mm (11.1 in) disc brake with 2-piston caliper (V-Ixion R) |
| Rake | 26° | | |
| Rear suspension | Steel swingarm with monoshock | | Steel swingarm with monoshock (V-Ixion); Aluminium swingarm with monoshock (V-Ixion R) |
| Rear tyre | 90/80–17M/C (49P) | 120/70-17M/C (58P) | 120/70-17M/C (58P) (V-Ixion); 130/70-17M/C (62P) (V-Ixion R) |
| Rear brakes | Drum | Single 203 mm (8.0 in) disc brake with 1-piston caliper | Single 203 mm (8.0 in) disc brake with 1-piston caliper (V-Ixion); Single 240 mm (9.4 in) disc brake with 1-piston caliper (V-Ixion R) |
| ABS | N/A | | |
Dimensions
| Length | 2,000 mm (78.7 in) | 2,010 mm (79.1 in) (2013–2015); 1,925 mm (75.8 in) (2015–2017) | 1,955 mm (77.0 in) (V-Ixion); 1,950 mm (76.8 in) (V-Ixion R) |
| Width | 705 mm (27.8 in) (2007–2015); 720 mm (28.3 in) (2015–2017) | | 720 mm (28.3 in) |
| Height | 1,035 mm (40.7 in) | 1,030 mm (40.6 in) | 1,025 mm (40.4 in) |
| Seat height | 790 mm (31.1 in) | | 795 mm (31.3 in) |
| Wheelbase | 1,282 mm (50.5 in) | 1,300 mm (51.2 in) | 1,295 mm (51.0 in) (V-Ixion); 1,320 mm (52.0 in) (V-Ixion R) |
| Ground clearance | 167 mm (6.6 in) | 165 mm (6.5 in) | |
| Trail | 100 mm (3.9 in) | | |
| Wet weight | 125 kg (276 lb) | 129 kg (284 lb) (2013–2015); 130 kg (287 lb) (2015–2017) | 132 kg (291 lb) (V-Ixion); 131 kg (289 lb) (V-Ixion R) |
| Fuel capacity | 12 L (2.6 imp gal; 3.2 US gal) | | 12 L (2.6 imp gal; 3.2 US gal) (V-Ixion); 11 L (2.4 imp gal; 2.9 US gal) (V-Ixion R) |
