= Yamaha FZ S Hybrid =

- Manufacturer: Yamaha Motor India
- Production: 2025–present
- Engine: 149 cc air-cooled single-cylinder, Blue Core
- Power: 12.4 PS @ 7,250 rpm
- Torque: 13.3 Nm @ 5,500 rpm
- Transmission: 5-speed manual
- Frame type: Diamond frame
- Brakes: Front disc with single-channel ABS
- Seat height: 790 mm
- Fuel capacity: 13 L

The Yamaha FZ S Hybrid is a 150cc commuter motorcycle introduced by Yamaha Motor India in March 2025. The model is described as India’s first hybrid motorcycle in the 150cc category and incorporates a Blue Core engine paired with a Smart Motor Generator (SMG) system.

== Design and features ==
The FZ S Hybrid follows the design language of the existing FZ series, with updates such as a sculpted fuel tank, LED headlamp, and revised switchgear. It is offered in two colours: Racing Blue and Cyan Metallic Grey.

A 4.2-inch TFT display supports Bluetooth connectivity through Yamaha’s Y-Connect app. The console provides navigation support, incoming alerts, and trip-related data.

== Engine and hybrid system ==
The FZ S Hybrid is powered by a 149cc air-cooled, Single-cylinder engine conforming to OBD-2B emission norms. It produces 12.4 PS at 7,250 rpm and 13.3 Nm of torque at 5,500 rpm. The Smart Motor Generator (SMG) provides motor-assisted acceleration, silent start, and enables a Start & Stop System during idling.

== Performance and efficiency ==
The manufacturer claims an ARAI-certified mileage of 60 kmpl. The model has a five-speed manual transmission and a top speed of approximately 115 km/h.

== Connectivity and safety ==
Bluetooth-based connectivity is offered via Yamaha’s Y-Connect app, providing navigation and diagnostic updates. Safety features include a single-channel ABS, tubeless tyres, and LED lighting.

== Pricing and availability ==
As of March 2025, the motorcycle is available in a single variant priced at ₹1,44,800 (ex-showroom, Delhi). It is positioned above the standard FZ lineup.

== Specifications ==
Specification	Details
Engine	149cc, air-cooled, single-cylinder, Blue Core
Power	12.4 PS @ 7,250 rpm
Torque	13.3 Nm @ 5,500 rpm
Transmission	5-speed manual
Mileage (claimed)	60 kmpl (ARAI)
Top Speed	115 km/h
Kerb Weight	138 kg
Fuel Tank Capacity	13 litres
Seat Height	790 mm
Display	4.2-inch TFT, Bluetooth connectivity
ABS	Single Channel
Colours	Racing Blue, Cyan Metallic Grey

== Market reception ==
The FZ S Hybrid received attention in automotive publications for introducing hybrid technology in the commuter segment. According to sales data, Yamaha’s FZ lineup, including the hybrid model, recorded over 13,000 units sold in India in April 2025.

== See also ==
- Yamaha Motor Company
- List of Yamaha motorcycles
- Hybrid vehicle
- Motorcycle
