= Yamaha MT-15 =

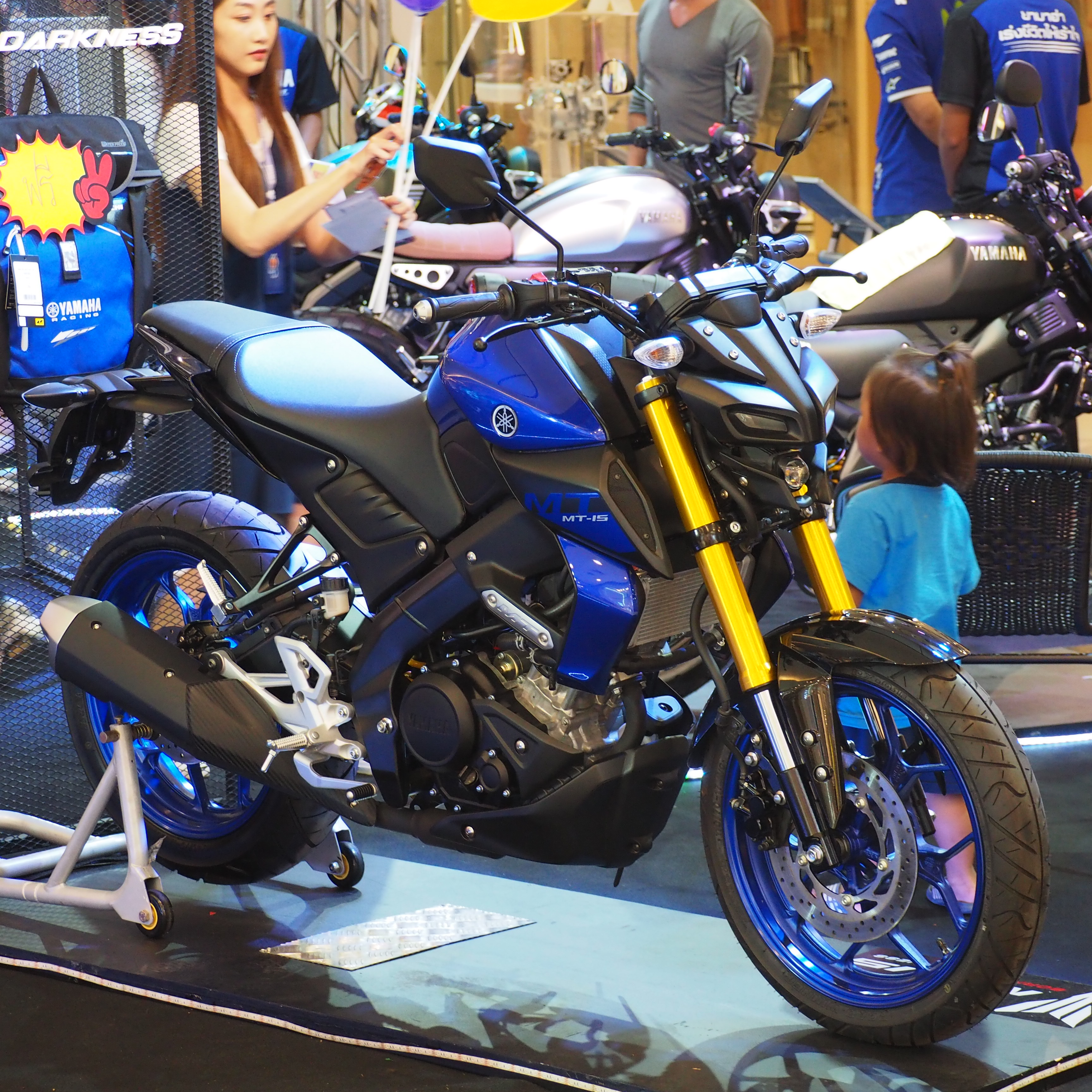
- Manufacturer: Yamaha Motor Company
- Production: 2018-present
- Class: Naked
- Engine: 155 cc (9.46 cu in) liquid-cooled 4-stroke 4-valve SOHC single-cylinder
- Bore / stroke: 58.0 mm × 58.7 mm (2.3 in × 2.3 in)
- Compression ratio: 11.6:1
- Power: 18.4 PS (13.5 kW) @ 10,000 r/min
- Torque: 14.1 N⋅m (10.4 lbf⋅ft) @ 7,500 r/min
- Transmission: Constant mesh, 6-speed / Return
- Frame type: twin-spar (Deltabox)
- Suspension: Front: Inverted telescopic fork Rear: Aluminum swingarm with monoshock
- Tires: Front: 110/70-17; Rear: 140/70-17
- Rake, trail: 89 mm (3.5 in)
- Wheelbase: 1,335 mm (52.6 in)
- Dimensions: L: 1,965 mm (77.4 in); W: 800 mm (31 in); H: 1,065 mm (41.9 in)
- Seat height: 810 mm (32 in)
- Fuel capacity: 10 L (2.2 imp gal; 2.6 US gal)
- Oil capacity: 1.05 L (0.23 imp gal; 0.28 US gal)
- Related: Yamaha FZ150i

Yamaha MT-15 is a motorcycle manufactured by Yamaha since 2018. It is based on the Yamaha YZF-R15, with 155cc water-cooled single-cylinder engine equipped with the mainframe and variable valve timing mechanism (VVA), the inverted front fork, etc. The exterior parts are specially designed, but the shape of the front mask is based on the Yamaha MT-09 from the 2017 model.

== Overview ==
Started manufacture in Thailand in December 2018, then January 2019 in Indonesia. Indonesia's specifications are also exported to the Philippines and Vietnam. Started manufacture in Malaysia in November 2020.

Manufactured in India from April 2019, with same engine body and frame design from Thailand's specifications, with differences on several parts such as the front fork, swing arm, wheel size, etc. Although the shape is quite similar except for telescopic front fork in terms of appearance, the ABS are standard equipment for India's specifications.

The latest generation MT in India gets inverted front forks, aluminum swing arm and dual channel ABS and Bluetooth connectivity as standard.
