= Yamaha FZ and FZR =

Motorcycle series

The Yamaha FZ is a series of Standard/Naked and Sport bikes made by Yamaha since 1984 under various incarnations.

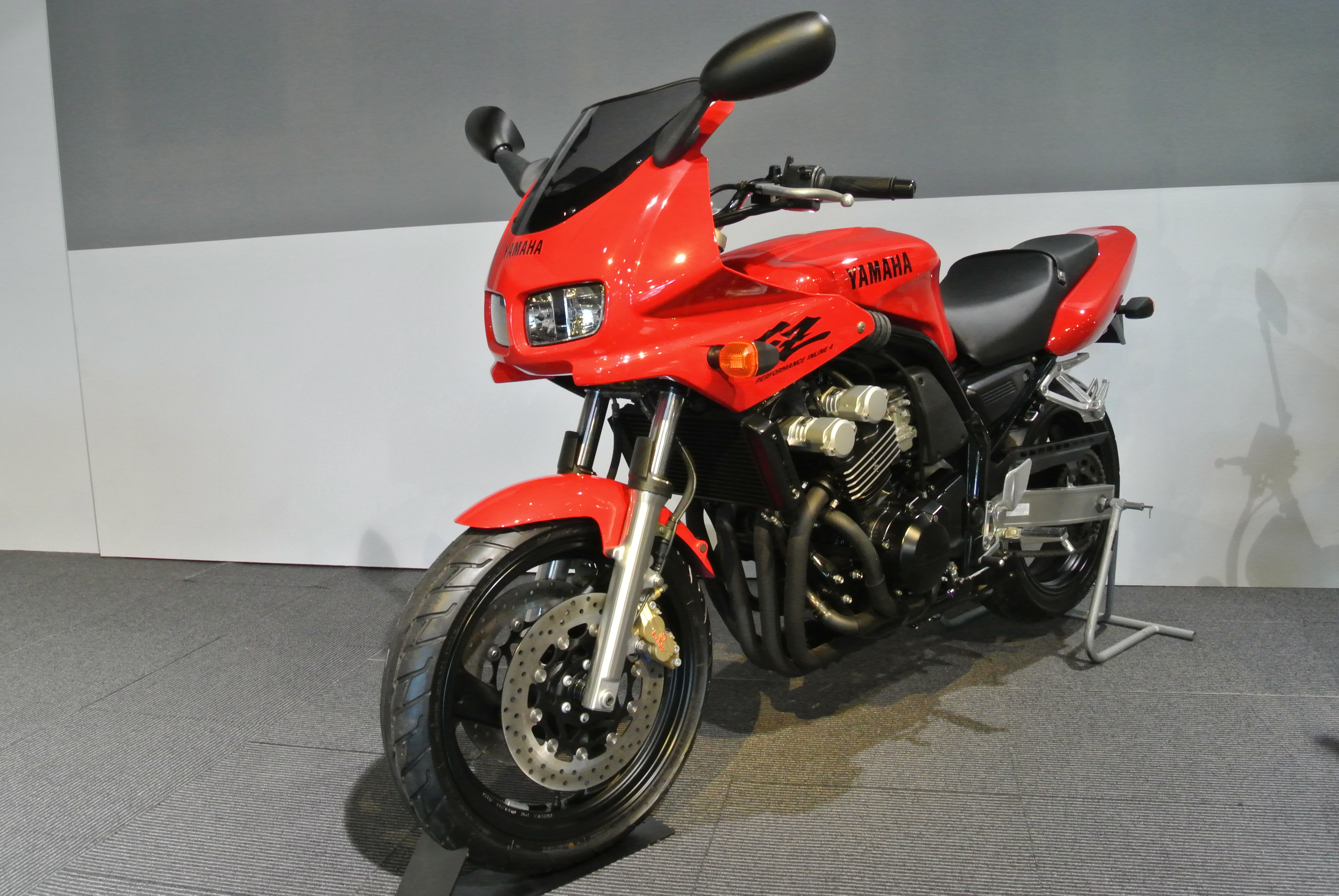
1997 Yamaha FZ400

== Original Series/Genesis Models ==
- FZX750 (1986–1995)
- FZ750 (1986–1991)
- FZ600 (1986–1988)
- FZ400R (1984–1988)
- FZ400 (1997–1999)
- FZ250 (1985–1986)

== Second Series ==
- FZ1 (2006–2015)
- FZ8 (2010–2015)
- FZ6 (2004–2009)
- FZ25 (2017–present)
- FZ16 (2008–present)
- FZ150i (2007–present)

== FZR Series ==
- FZR1000 (1987–1995)
- FZR750 (1987–1992)
- FZR600 (1988–1995)
- FZR400 (1987–1994)
- FZR250 (1986–1994)

== FZS Series ==
- FZS1000 Fazer (2001–2005)
- FZS600 Fazer (1998–2004)

== See also ==
- Yamaha FZ S Hybrid
