= Yamaha Phazer =

Snowmobile by the Yamaha Motor Company

Phazer is the name of a model of snowmobile produced by the Yamaha Motor Company. Introduced in 1984, it became a popular model for Yamaha and spawned several follow-up models (such as the Phazer II, Phazer Deluxe, Phazer Mountain Lite, Phazer FX, and Phazer GT); its design features were also incorporated into other models (such as later-model Exciters as well as the Venture Lite).

Of particular note on the Phazer is way in which the headlight is directly connected to the handlebars so that the headlight follows the direction of a turn. This feature was certainly new among Yamaha models when it was introduced in 1984, and Yamaha claims that it and other features 'began a new era in snowmobiling'. The Phazer was always known for its sharp handling, free-revving 485cc fan-cooled engine, solid reliability (most notably on Phazer II), light weight, and most importantly, value. Ride quality akin to most of the snowmobiles of that era.

Snowmobiles under the original Phazer name appeared until 1989; new models such as the Phazer II, Phazer Deluxe, Phazer SS etc., were sold until 1998, when it was revamped to the more traditional looking snowmobile and was known as the Phazer 500 (1999-2001). For the 2002 model year the Phazer nameplate was axed, where it would take a five-year absence.

Yamaha released a bold new snowmobile under the Phazer name-plate for the 2007 model year. The snowmobile featured a radical new design which is inspired from the YZ250F motocross bike. The new Phazer is powered by a new 80 hp 499cc fuel-injected liquid-cooled four-stroke twin which makes its peak power at 11,000RPM. The engine is based on Yamaha's highly successful and dependable YZ250F dirt bike engine. With a 487-pound estimated dry weight, it is one of the lightest production four-strokes.

The 2007-era Yamaha Phazer was discontinued at the end of the 2018 model year amidst Yamaha's restructuring of their model lineups for 2019.
