= Yamaha FZ6 =

Motorcycle

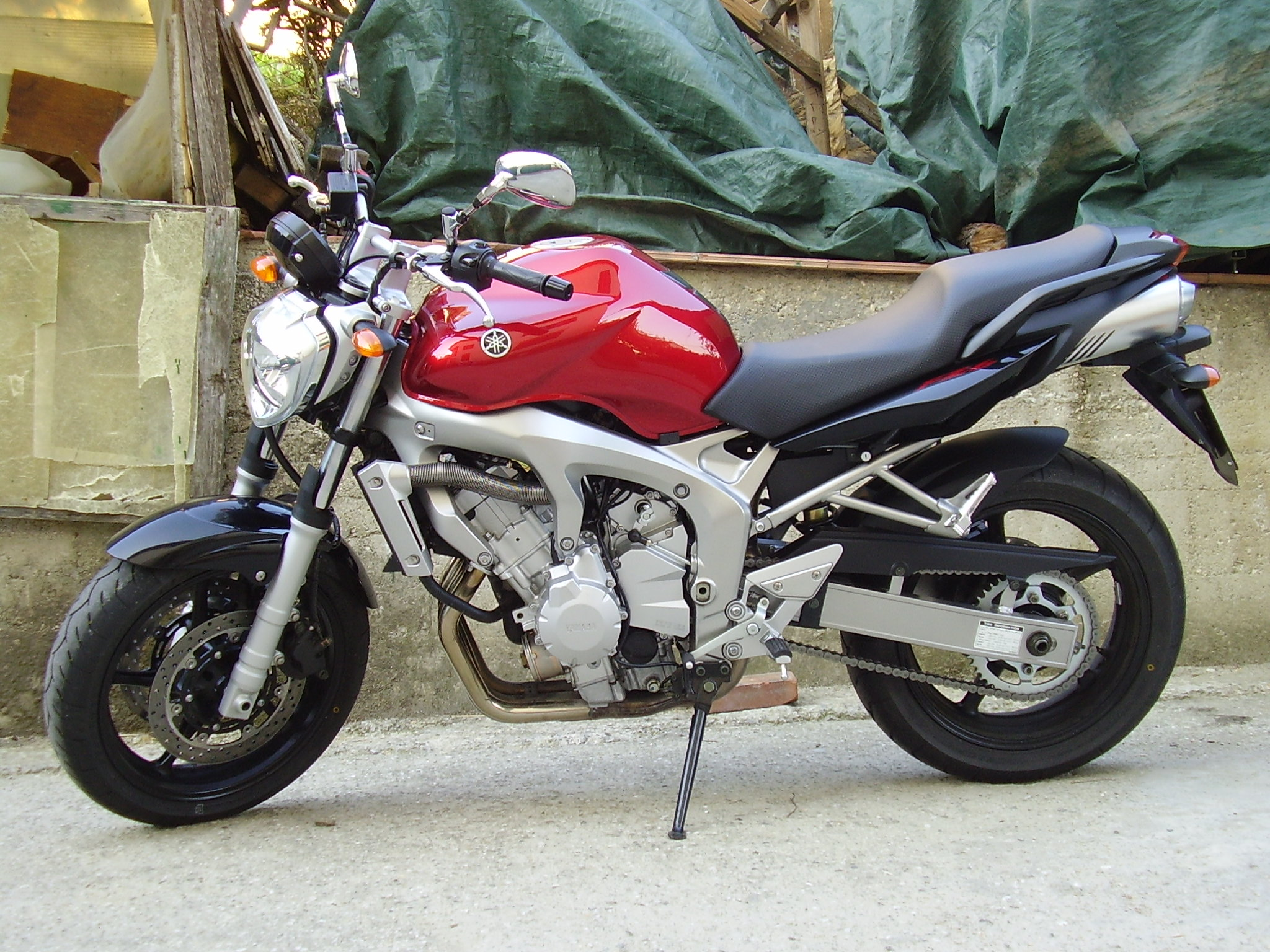
- Yamaha FZ6N
- Manufacturer: Yamaha Motor Company
- Also called: FZ6 Fazer
- Production: 2004–2009
- Predecessor: FZS600 Fazer
- Class: Standard or sport bike
- Engine: 600 cc (37 cu in), liquid-cooled, DOHC, inline 4-cylinder, 16 valves
- Bore / stroke: 65.5 mm × 44.5 mm (2.6 in × 1.8 in)
- Compression ratio: 12.2:1
- Transmission: Multi-plate clutch, 6-speed, chain
- Rake, trail: 25.0°, 97 mm (3.8 in)
- Wheelbase: 1,440 mm (56.7 in)
- Dimensions: L: 2,100 mm (82.5 in); W: 750 mm (29.5 in)
- Seat height: 790 mm (31.1 in)
- Fuel capacity: 19.4 L (4.3 imp gal; 5.1 US gal)
- Related: Yamaha FZ Series; Yamaha FZ1

The Yamaha FZ6, also known as the FZ6 FAZER, is a 600 cc (37 cu in) motorcycle that was introduced by Yamaha in 2004 as a middleweight street bike built around the 2003 YZF-R6 engine. The engine is retuned for more usable midrange power. As a multi-purpose motorcycle it can handle sport riding, touring, and commuting. In 2010, the FZ6 was replaced by the fully faired FZ6R in North America, and the XJ6 in Europe. The FZ6 styling was continued in 2011 with the Yamaha FZ8.

This bike is a popular choice for its half-fairing, upright seating position, and underseat exhaust. These features position it between a full supersport and a naked streetfighter (although in Europe and Australia, there is an available naked FZ6N option).

== Model history ==
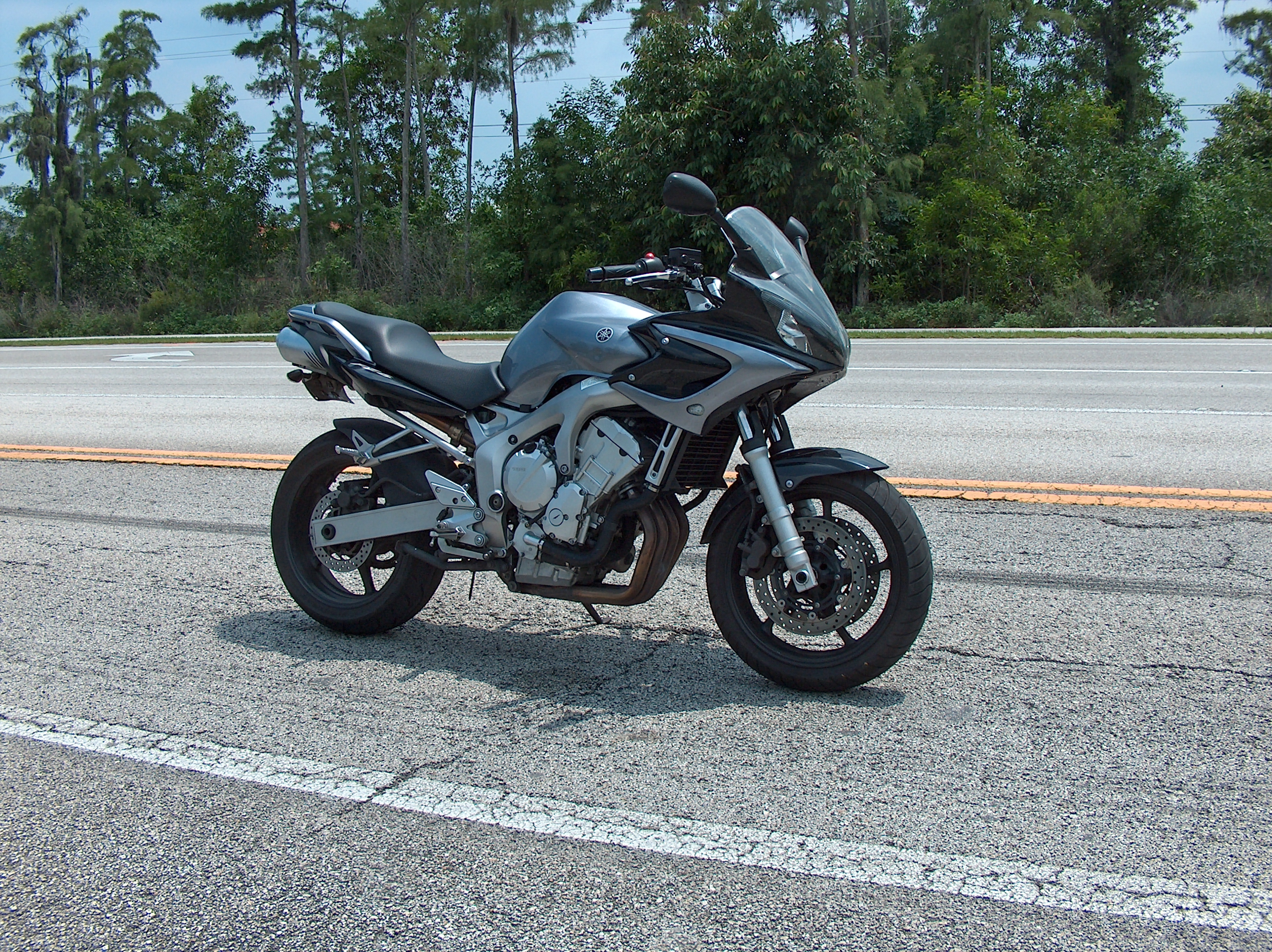
2005 Yamaha FZ6

=== 2006 revision ===
The FZ6 in 2006 has a revised engine, frame, subframe, grabhandle, rear swingarm and wheels are painted in black. It had a metal honeycomb type catalytic converter satisfies EU2 and CARB emissions standards, and optimized fuel injection (FI) system mapping to increase torque at lower engine speeds.

=== 2007 revision ===
In October 2006, Yamaha announced an updated FZ6 for the 2007 model year. The FZ6 received optimized fuel injection (FI) system mapping, redesigned fairing and windscreen, new instrument cluster with analog tachometer and digital speedometer (similar to the FZ1), new four-piston monoblock brake calipers for the front brake, alumite-finished front forks with revised damping, a three-way catalytic converter, a new seat design, a new rear swingarm, and new passenger footpegs.

=== 2008 revision ===
The 2008 model is technically unchanged from 2007. The only difference is in appearance of front cowling around the headlights, which is now black regardless of motorcycle color. The European model 'FZ6 Fazer S2 ABS' has ABS and electronic immobilizer as standard.

=== 2009 revision ===
The 2009 model (introduced on September 8, 2008) is technically unchanged from 2008/2007, besides the optional more comfortable seat becoming standard.

=== 2010 revision ===
For the 2010 model year, Yamaha continued to sell the FZ6 Fazer S2 (half-faired) and FZ6 S2 (naked) in Europe. Both have full power (98 HP) and ABS.

Reduced power models have been discontinued and replaced with the XJ6 with optional ABS. In North America, the fully faired XJ6 Diversion F, having no ABS and electronic immobilizer, is known as FZ6R and replaces the FZ6 in its second season on the market.

== Specifications ==
Model Year	2004	2005	2006	2007	2008	2009
Engine
Engine Type	600 cc, liquid-cooled, inline 4-cylinder					
Bore/Stroke	65.5 mm × 44.5 mm (2.58 in × 1.75 in)					
Compression Ratio	12.1:1					
Valve train	DOHC, four valves per cylinder					
Carburetion	Group fuel injection, 36 mm throttle bodies					
Ignition	Digital TCI					
Drivetrain
Transmission	6-speed w/multi-plate clutch					
Gear Ratios 1st 2nd 3rd 4th 5th 6th	37/13 (2.846); 37/19 (1.947); 28/18 (1.556); 32/24 (1.333); 25/21 (1.190); 26/24 (1.083)					
Primary reduction ratio	86/44 (1.955)					
Final reduction ratio	46/16 (2.875)					
Final drive	#530 O-ring chain					
Chassis/Suspension/Brakes
Front suspension	43 mm telescopic fork, 5.1" (130 mm) travel					
Rear suspension	Single shock, adjustable preload; 5.1" (130 mm) travel					
Front brakes	Dual 298 mm floating discs w/2-piston slide pin-type calipers			Dual 298.0 × 5.0 mm (11.73 × 0.20 in) floating discs w/4-piston monoblock calipers		
Rear brakes	245 × 5.0 mm (9.65 × 0.20 in) mm disc w/single-piston caliper					
Front tire	120/70ZR-17M/C 58W (Bridgestone/BT020F GG or Dunlop/D252F)					
Rear tire	180/55ZR-17M/C 73W (Bridgestone/BT020R GG or Dunlop/D252)					
Dimensions
Fuel capacity / Reserve	19.4 L (4.3 imp gal; 5.1 US gal); 3.6 L (0.79 imp gal; 0.95 US gal)					
Cooling system	Radiator capacity (including all routes) - 2.00 L (2.11 US qt); Radiator capacity - 0.60 L (0.63 US qt); Coolant reservoir capacity (up to the maximum level mark) - 0.25 L (0.26 US qt)					
Height	47.8 in (1214 mm)			47.6 in (1210 mm)		
Length	82.5 in (2095 mm)					
Wet weight				FZS6W 207.0 kg (456 lb) FZS6WC 208.0 kg (459 lb)		
Rake	25.0°					
Seat height	31.5 in (800 mm)		31.3 in (795 mm)			
Trail	3.84 in (97.5 mm)					
Wheelbase	56.7 in (1440 mm)					
Width	29.5 in (750 mm)					
Ground Clearance	5.7 in (145 mm)					
Performance
Maximum power	98 HP / 73kW @12 000 RPM					
Maximum torque	46.5 ft-lb / 63.1 Nm @10 000 RPM					

== FZ6N ==
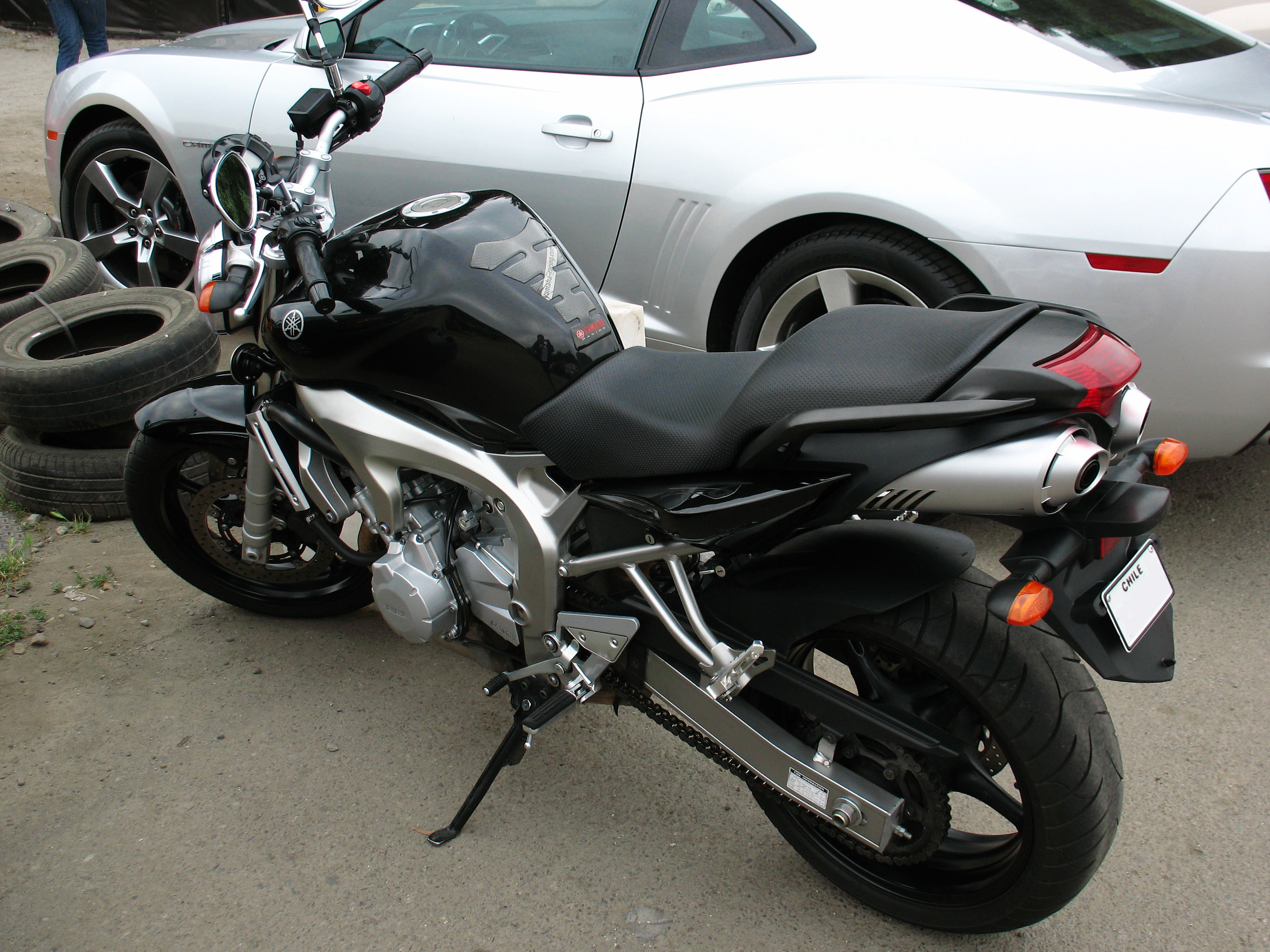
2009 Yamaha FZ6N

The FZ6N is virtually identical to the standard FZ6 Fazer model with the exception of not having the half-fairing fitted.
