= Yamaha XJ900 =

Japanese motorcycle model

The Yamaha XJ900 is a motorcycle manufactured by Yamaha from 1983. It was a development of the original Yamaha XJ model, the XJ 650, which was the foundation for the entire XJ series.

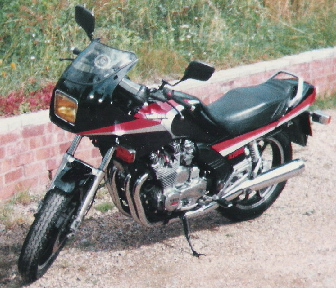
Yamaha XJ900 31A

In its original incarnation, the XJ900 had an air-cooled, double overhead camshaft, 853 cc (52.1 cu in) 4-stroke, 4-cylinder, 8-valve engine. Originally fitted with a handlebar mounted bikini fairing, its handling came in for criticism. This was quickly replaced with a frame mounted upper fairing and retrofitted to all models. The 1983 XJ900 came with anti-dive front forks, shaft drive and has triple disc brakes (2 front, 1 rear).

A revised version was launched in 1984 and displaced 891 cc (54.4 cu in). Aside from the engine capacity increase it was equipped with more conventional forks than its predecessor and a belly pan came as standard. The increase in engine capacity meant the carburettors went up from 35 mm to 36 mm. Fuel capacity is 22 litres and the transmission is a 5-speed. Aside from these changes it was nearly identical to the original and was manufactured until 1994.

The XJ900 Diversions were their replacements.

== Model engine and frame codes ==
1983 to 1984 - 853 cc 31A

1984 to 1990 - 891 cc 58L

1990 to 1994 - 891 cc 4BB1

== See also ==
- Yamaha motorcycles
