= Yamaha FZ8 =

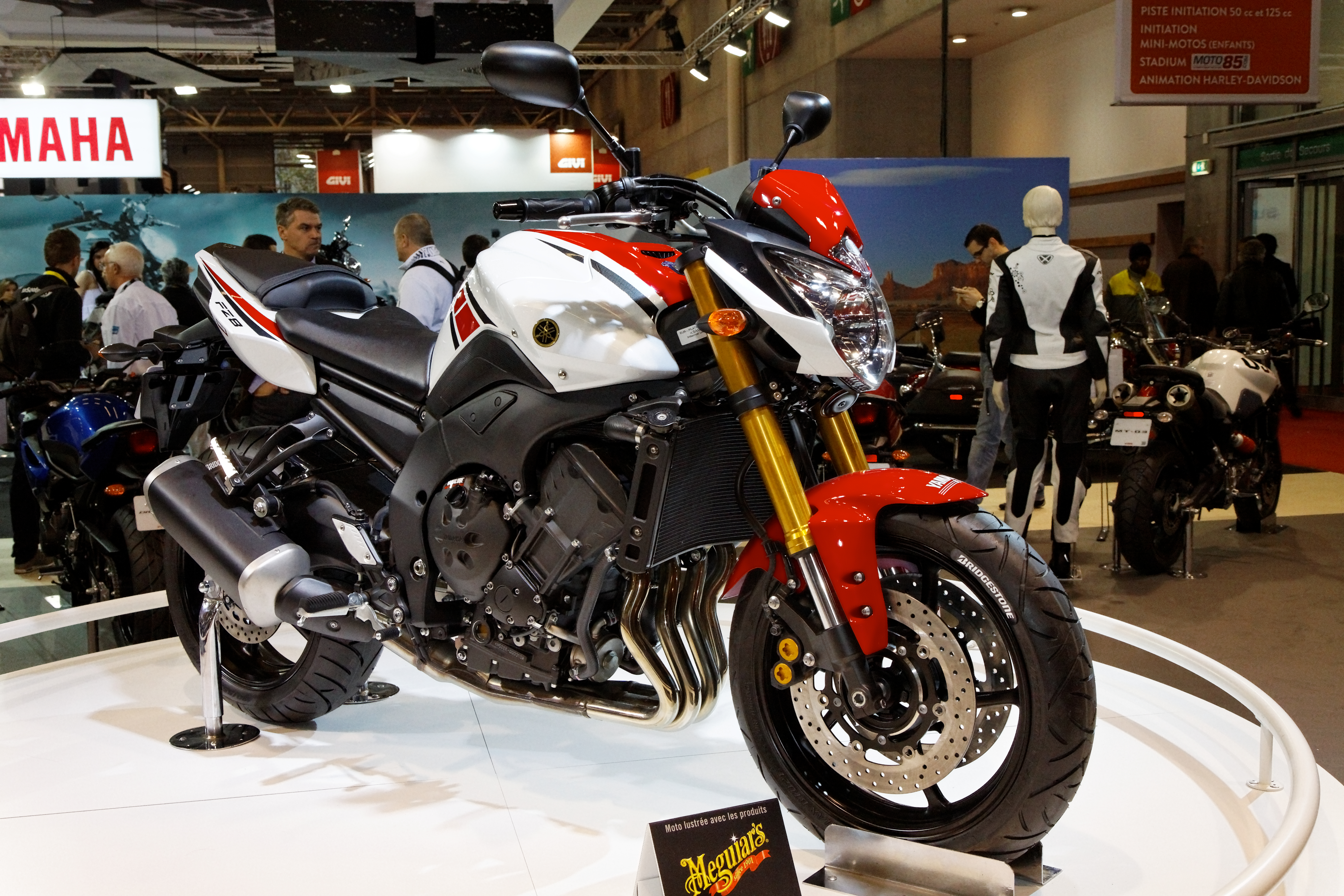
- Manufacturer: Yamaha Motor Corporation
- Also called: FZ8-N & FZ8-S
- Production: 2010–2015
- Predecessor: Yamaha FZ6
- Successor: Yamaha MT-09
- Class: Naked bike
- Engine: 779 cc inline-4
- Bore / stroke: 68.0 mm × 53.6 mm (2.68 in × 2.11 in)
- Compression ratio: 12.0:1
- Top speed: 117–162 mph (189–260 km/h)
- Power: 66.72–68.31 kW (89.47–91.6 hp) @ 9,900 rpm
- Torque: 69.40–71.04 N⋅m (51.19–52.4 lb⋅ft) @ 8,100 rpm
- Transmission: 6-speed, chain drive
- Frame type: Aluminium
- Suspension: Front: 43 mm inverted telescopic forks (adjustable after 2013); Rear: single shock (Adjustable for spring pre-load from 2013)
- Brakes: Front: Dual discs, 310 mm, 4-piston calipers Rear: Single disc, 267 mm, 1-piston caliper ABS standard on FAZER8
- Tyres: Front: 120/70ZR17; Rear: 180/55 ZR17; Bridgestone BT21s
- Rake, trail: 25°, 109 mm (4.3 in)
- Wheelbase: 1,460 mm (57 in)
- Dimensions: L: 2,140 mm (84 in); W: 770 mm (30 in); H: 1,225 mm (48.2 in)
- Seat height: 815 mm (32.1 in)
- Weight: 212–215 kg (468–473 lb) (wet)
- Fuel capacity: 17 L (3.7 imp gal; 4.5 US gal)
- Oil capacity: 3.10 L (3.28 US qt)
- Fuel consumption: 5.60–5.33 L/100 km; 50.4–53.0 mpg_{‑imp} (42–44.1 mpg_{‑US})
- Related: Yamaha FZ Series

The Yamaha FZ8 and FAZER8, also known as the FZ8N and FZ8S, are motorcycles produced since 2010 by Yamaha Motor Corporation for sale in the United States, Europe, Canada, Australia and New Zealand. The FZ8 is a naked bike, while the virtually identical FAZER8 features a half fairing and ABS. The FZ8 and FAZER8 replace the smaller capacity FZ6 and FZ6 FAZER, although as of July 2010 these continue to be sold in other markets.

Both motorcycles have a 779 cc inline-four engine, derived from the 998 cc FZ1 engine, but with a bore reduced from 77 to 68 mm (3.0 to 2.7 in), and the same stroke of 53.6 mm (2.11 in). Other differences from the FZ1 engine include a lighter crankshaft, smaller valves and revised camshaft profiles. The aluminium frame and swingarm are also taken from the FZ1.

The FZ8 has been discontinued in the United States after 2013.

Some UK reviewers have criticised the bikes for being expensive compared with rivals such as the Triumph Street Triple and Kawasaki Z750. Motorcycle Consumer News tested the 2011 FZ8's wet weight at 212 kg (468 lb), with an engine output of 66.72 kW (89.47 hp) and 69.40 N⋅m (51.19 lb⋅ft) torque at the rear wheel. They found an average fuel economy of 5.33 L/100 km; 53.0 mpg_{‑imp} (44.1 mpg_{‑US}) and a top speed of 221.1 km/h (137.4 mph). The bike showed an acceleration of 0 to 97 km/h (0 to 60 mph) in 3.51 seconds and 0.00 to 0.40 km (0 to 1/4 mi) in 11.55 seconds at 186.22 km/h (115.71 mph). Motorcycle Consumer News tested the braking at 97 to 0 km/h (60 to 0 mph) in 34.7 m (113.9 ft).

Cycle World reported a wet weight of 215 kg (473 lb) and an average fuel economy of 5.6 L/100 km; 50 mpg_{‑imp} (42 mpg_{‑US}), and 97 to 0 km/h (60 to 0 mph) braking in 42 m (137 ft). They saw acceleration of 0 to 97 km/h (0 to 60 mph) in 3.3 seconds and 0.00 to 0.40 km (0 to 1/4 mi) in 11.31 seconds at 192.64 km/h (119.70 mph), and measured the FZ8's top speed at 230 km/h (140 mph). They dynamometer tested the rear wheel horsepower at 68.3 kW (91.6 hp) @ 9,900 rpm and torque at 71.0 J (52.4 ft⋅lb) @ 8,100 rpm.

In 2013 the front suspension became adjustable.
