= Yamaha FZ1 =

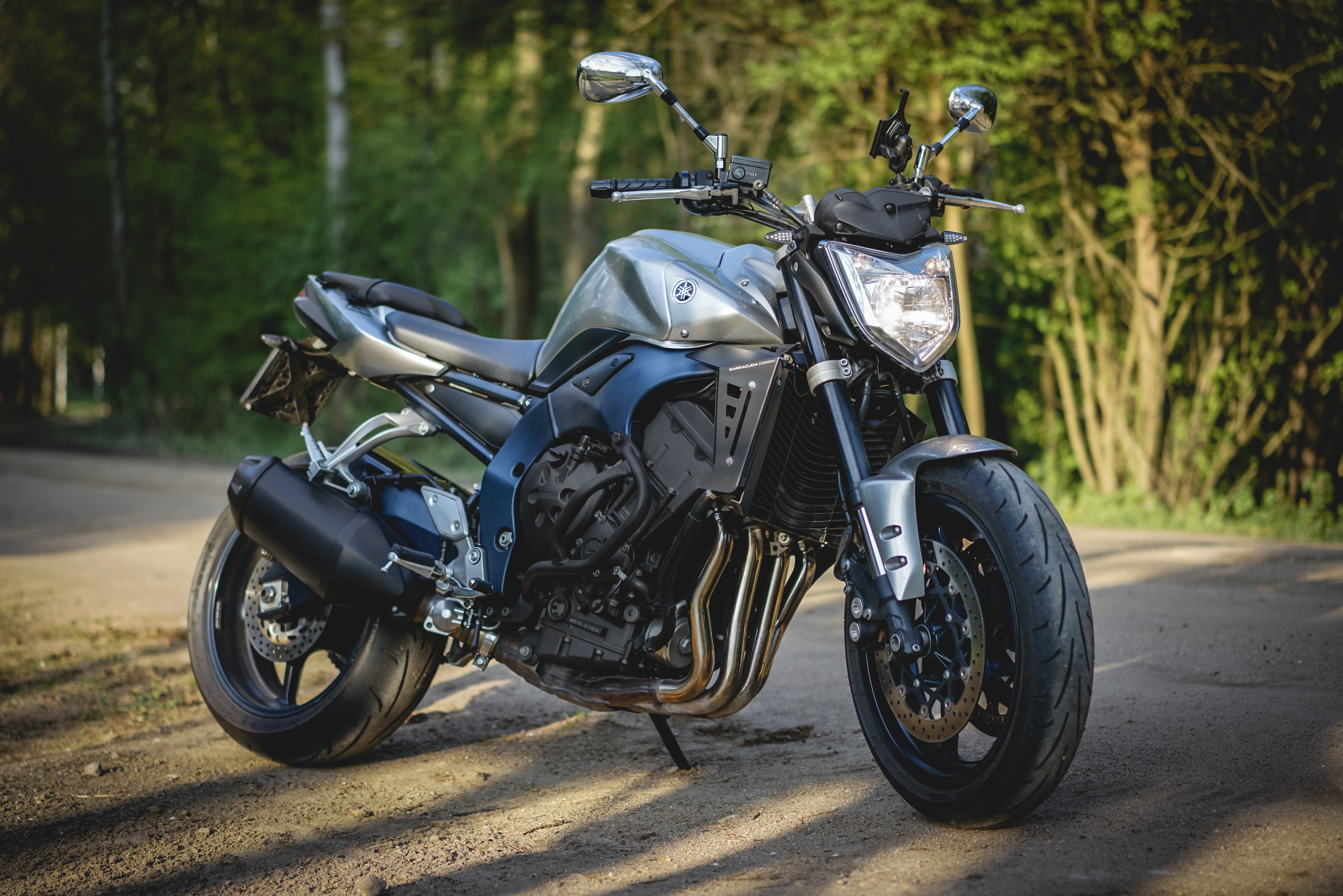
- Manufacturer: Yamaha Motor Company
- Also called: Yamaha FZS1000 Fazer (2001–2005); Yamaha FZ1 Fazer (2006–2015)
- Parent company: Yamaha Corporation
- Production: 2001–2015
- Successor: Yamaha MT-10/FZ-10
- Class: Naked bike
- Engine: 998 cc (60.9 cu in) liquid-cooled 4-stroke 20-valve DOHC inline-four
- Power: 111.8 kW (149.9 hp; 152.0 PS) @ 11,000 rpm (claimed)
- Torque: 106.8 N⋅m (78.8 lbf⋅ft) @ 8,000 rpm (claimed)
- Related: Yamaha FZ Series; Yamaha FZ6; Yamaha FZ8; Yamaha YZF-R1

The Yamaha FZ1 is a naked bike made by Yamaha Motor Company in Japan.

== First generation (FZS1000 Fazer; 2001–05) ==
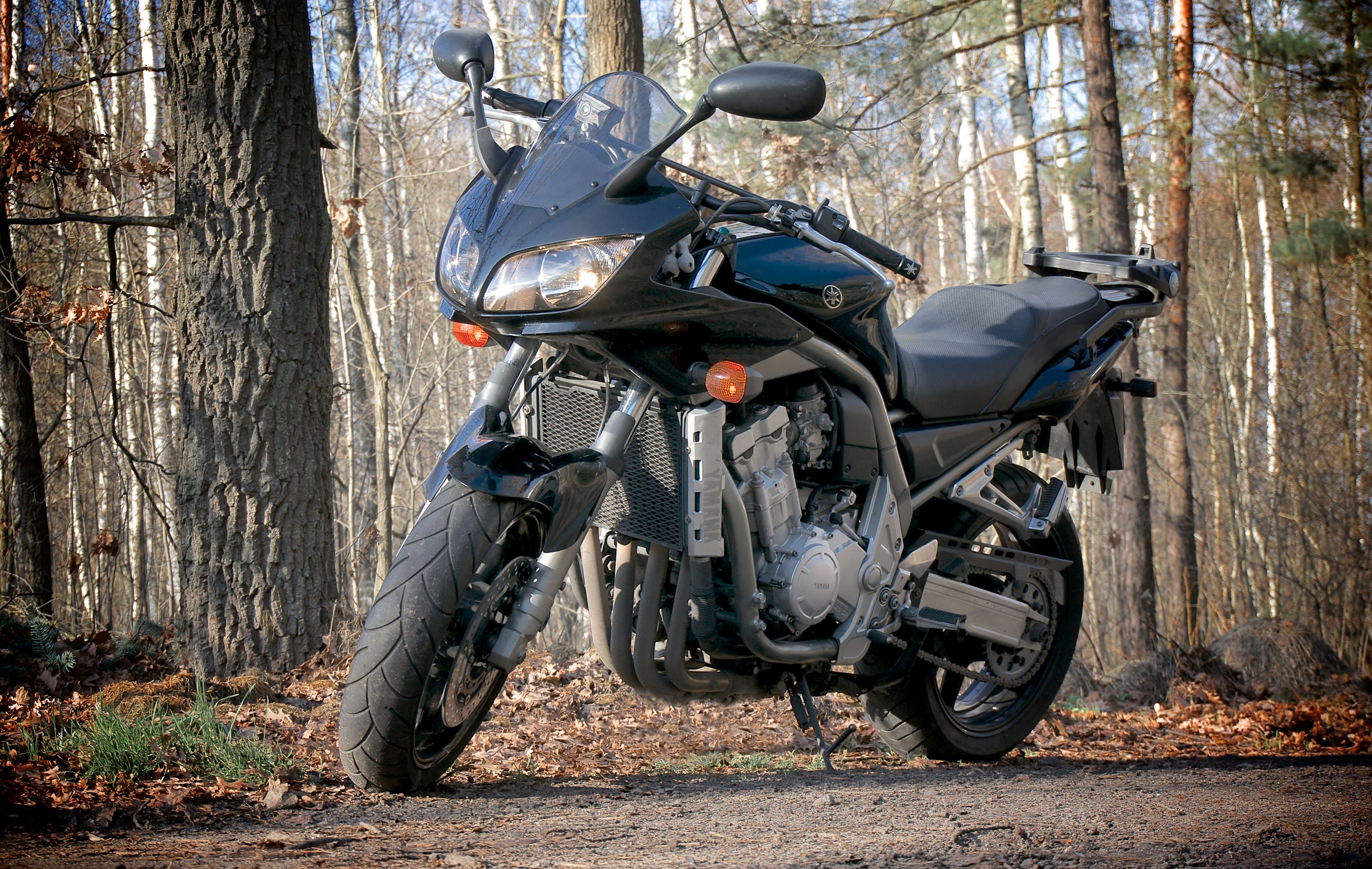
2002 Yamaha FZS1000S Fazer

First generation models are known as the FZ1 in the United States and FZS1000 Fazer in Europe. They have tubular steel frames and modified YZF-R1 engines which are carbureted. The models were virtually unchanged over this period, except for colour options, the introduction of the FZS1000S which had a black engine, and in some European countries the 2005 models were fitted with rudimentary catalytic converters.

== Second generation (FZ1 Fazer; 2006–15) ==
In 2006, the bike got a completely different model, still known as FZ1 in USA. In Europe and other markets, it was known as FZ1-S Fazer, which is semi-faired alongside a naked (without fairing) version which was known as FZ1-N. The main changes included a new chassis, suspension, bodywork and a completely different engine. Cast aluminum diecast diamond-shaped frame with the engine as stressed member replaced the older tubular steel frame along with a control-filled die-cast swingarm. This brought the bike up to date with modern rivals. The new model has a 150 bhp 998 cc (60.9 cu in) 20-valve DOHC engine from the 2004–2006 YZF-R1 tuned for better midrange torque, set in an all-new compact diamond-shaped aluminium frame. Most of this engine is identical to the YZF-R1. The primary internal changes are a 40 percent heavier flywheel and revised balance shaft. New camshafts with reduced lift and duration aim to boost performance at lower revs, and the gearbox's top two ratios are higher to give a more relaxed feel at cruising speeds. Modifications are as follows:

=== 2006 ===
- Stiff rear spring with a 700 lb/in
- 2006 version when first introduced had distinct throttle snatch at 5,000––6,000 rpm, where rolling off the throttle and rolling back on caused a distinct surge in acceleration due to 'fuel cut' for emissions reasons.

=== 2007 ===
- Softened rear shock spring.
- Updated fuel injection system. Throttle snatch reduced to normal by slowing secondary butterfly opening. This smoothed out the surge caused by 'fuel cut' and subsequent re-application of fuel.

=== 2010 ===
- Revised ECU mapping to achieve improved throttle response in the low to mid rpm range.

=== 2011 ===
- The ECU mapping revised for improved throttle response at low rpm.

=== 2014–15 ===
- The ECU mapping revised again for smoother mid range. 2014 and 2015 models are the same except for the color. 2015 is the last year for the FZ1 in the US. First in Europe, the naked FZ1-N and half-faired FZ1-S Fazer were replaced by the FZ-10/MT-10 of Yamaha's new ″Hyper Naked″ class, which is available with accessory touring pack.

2006-14 models are known for rotor failure; the magnets delaminate which can cause catastrophic engine damage. Generally, owners replace the factory rotors with updated ones.

EU models were offered with optional ABS, adding 6kg to weight due to ABS unit to a total wet weight of 226kg. Yamaha also offered in EU a GT version with full fairing and side bags. Full fairing was possible to purchase separately for converting existing bikes to GT version.

== Specifications ==
	2001–2004	2005	2006–2007	2008–2009	2010–2012
Engine
Type	998 cc, liquid-cooled, 20-valve, DOHC, in-line four-cylinder				
Bore x stroke	74 x 58 mm		77 x 53.6 mm		
Carburetion	(4) 37 mm Mikuni (model BSR37 x 4) CV w/ throttle position sensor (TPS)		32-bit Mikuni R1-based Electronic Fuel Injection, 45mm throttle bodies w/ throttle position sensor (TPS)		
Compression ratio	11.4:1		11.5:1		
Final drive	O-ring chain				
Ignition	Digital TCI		Digital TCI: Transistor Controlled Ignition with 32-bit ECU		
Transmission	Constant-Mesh 6-speed w/multi-plate clutch				
Performance
Power	93.1 kW (124.9 hp) (rear wheel)		110 kW (150 hp) (claimed); 94.4 kW (126.6 hp) (rear wheel)	94.13 kW (126.23 hp) (rear wheel)	95.7 kW (128.3 hp) (rear wheel)
Torque	100.2 N⋅m (73.9 lb⋅ft) (rear wheel)		89.1 N⋅m (65.7 lb⋅ft) (rear wheel)	88.36 N⋅m (65.17 lb⋅ft) (rear wheel)	90.4 N⋅m (66.7 lb⋅ft) (rear wheel)
Top speed	154 mph (248 km/h)		154 mph (248 km/h)	153.6 mph (247.2 km/h)	160 mph (260 km/h)
Chassis
Brakes front	Dual 298mm floating discs w/4-piston calipers		Dual 320 mm floating discs; forged monoblock 4-piston Sumitomo calipers		
Brakes rear	Single 267mm disc w/2-piston caliper		245mm disc w/ single-piston pin-slide Nissin caliper		
Suspension front	43mm telescopic fork w/adjustable preload, compression and rebound damping; 5.6 in (142 mm) travel		MotoGP style 43 mm Kayaba telescopic USD fork w/adjustable preload, compression damping (left leg), rebound damping (right leg); 5.1 in (130 mm) travel		
Suspension rear	Single shock w/ piggyback reservoir and adjustable preload, adjustable compression, and adjustable rebound damping; Coil Spring / Gas-oil Damper; 5.31 in (135 mm) travel		Single link-actuated Kayaba monoshock w/adjustable spring preload, rebound damping; 5.1 in (130 mm) travel		
Tires front	120/70-ZR17 (58W)				
Tires rear	180/55-ZR17 (73W)		190/50-ZR17		
Dimensions
Length	83.7 in (2,126 mm)		84.3 in (2,141 mm)		
Width	30.1 in (765 mm)		30.3 in (770 mm)		
Height	46.9 in (1,191 mm)		47.4 in (1,204 mm)		
Seat height	32.3 in (820 mm)		32.1 in (815 mm)		
Wheelbase	57.1 in (1,450 mm)		57.5 in (1,460 mm)		
Rake/caster angle	26.0 °		25.0 °		
Trail	4.09 in (104 mm)		4.3 in (109 mm)		
Fuel capacity	21 L (4.6 imp gal; 5.5 US gal); 4 L (0.88 imp gal; 1.1 US gal) reserve		18 L (4.0 imp gal; 4.8 US gal); 3.4 L (0.75 imp gal; 0.90 US gal) reserve		
Recommended fuel	91+ research octane [RON] (86+ US pump octane [(R+M)/2])				
Oil capacity	3.7 L (3.9 US qt) Total; 3.0 L (3.2 US qt) w/ filter; 2.8 L (3.0 US qt) w/o filter		3.8 L (4.0 US qt) Total; 3.1 L (3.3 US qt) w/ filter; 2.9 L (3.1 US qt) w/o filter		
Coolant capacity	2.4 L (2.5 US qt) radiator; 0.3 L (0.32 US qt) reservoir		2.25 L (2.38 US qt) radiator; 0.25 L (0.26 US qt) reservoir		
Dry weight	458 lb (208 kg)	459 lb (208 kg)	438 lb (199 kg)	439 lb (199 kg)	440 lb (200 kg)
Wet weight	509 lb (231 kg)	510 lb (230 kg)	485 lb (220 kg)	486 lb (220 kg)	487 lb (221 kg)
Charging output	365 watts at 5,000 rpm		560 watts at 5,600 rpm		

== Reviews ==
The 2001 model received a good review from Motorcyclist Magazine

The 2001 model received a good review from Motorcycle-USA.com

The updated 2006 model received a good review from Motorcycle-USA.com

The 2006 model received a good review from Cycle World

FZ1 came second in a Rider Magazine Naked bike comparison

The 2009 model received an excellent review from Two Wheel Freaks

The 2008 model received an interesting review from Motorcycle Thailand

Building the Perfect Motorcycle
