= Yamaha Mio =

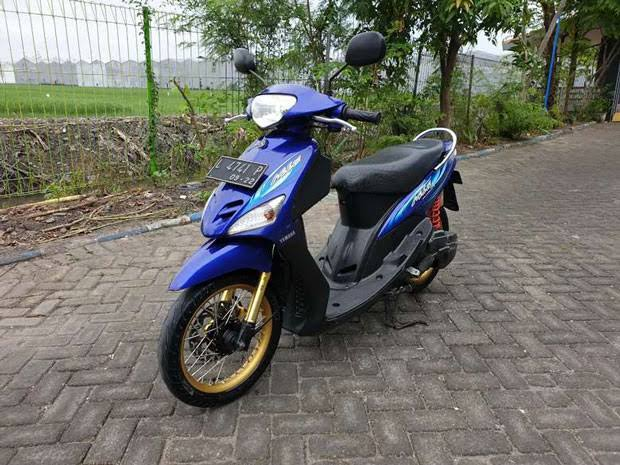
- Yamaha Mio "Sporty" In a used motorcycle website/article
- Manufacturer: Yamaha Motor Co., Ltd.
- Also called: Yamaha Ego (Malaysia); Yamaha Mio (Indonesia)
- Parent company: Yamaha
- Production: 2003-present
- Class: Scooter
- Engine: 113.7 cc (115), 4-stroke, SOHC, 2 valve, air cooled (124.8 cc (125), 4-stroke, SOHC, 2 valve, air cooled)
- Power: Carburetor 5.98kW (8.9 PS)@ 12,000 rpm Fuel injected 7,75 ps @ 8,500 rpm 125 version 7.0kW (9.5 PS)@ 8,500 rpm
- Torque: Carburetor 7.53Nm @ 7000 rpm Fuel injected 8,5Nm @ 5000 rpm 125 version 9.6Nm @ 5,500 rpm
- Transmission: CVT
- Suspension: Front telescopic fork; Rear swingarm
- Brakes: Front disc brake or drum brake (differ in several models); Rear drum brake
- Wheelbase: 1.26 m
- Dimensions: L: 1,870 mm W: 685 mm H: 1,035-1,060 mm
- Seat height: 750mm
- Weight: 87 kg (192 lb) (dry); 90 kg (200 lb) (wet)
- Fuel capacity: 4.1L - 4.2L
- Related: Yamaha Nouvo; Yamaha Vino 125; Yamaha Fino

The Yamaha Mio is a scooter with a CVT transmission made by Yamaha Motor. It was introduced for the Southeast Asia market in 2003 as the successor of the Nouvo. In Malaysia, this model is known as Yamaha Ego. As 2007, there were some 76,000 Ego customers in Malaysia. Together with its counterpart the Yamaha Nouvo, the Mio/Ego is a platform for customization in Thailand, Malaysia, Indonesia, Vietnam and the Philippines.

== Model history ==
=== 2003 ===
Based on sales performance and also technical studies of its predecessor Yamaha Nouvo by Yamaha's R&D team, in 2003 Yamaha Motor successfully developed and marketed Yamaha Mio in Southeast Asia countries and in March 2004, Hong Leong Yamaha (HLY) introduced this model in Malaysia, renaming it Yamaha Ego.

=== 2006 ===
2006 brought some new changes to the Mio. It was renamed and since then has been known as the Yamaha Mio Soul (except for the Malaysian market).

Physical change also can be seen in the 2006 model specifications. This includes an aggressive facelift by the Yamaha team: it features newly design V-shape headlight for better vision range at night and new body stripes. The engine, however, remained the same as in the 2003 model. For safety concerns, the taillight was re-designed with the addition of a retroreflector device.

For the Malaysian market, HLY again renamed the scooter as the Yamaha Ego S (S for Sport) and launched it in October 2007. The launch ceremony took place at the Sheraton Subang Hotel in Kuala Lumpur, Malaysia.

=== 2012 ===
2012 changed from carburetor to fuel injected with big pulley CVT, with DiaSil cylinder and forged piston to reduce engine weight.

=== 2014 ===
In 2014, all models switched to a new 125cc engine, using biggest size pulley in CVT and short range belt CVT, making more constant speed and easier acceleration in uphill. DiaSil cylinder engine with forged piston and lighter body structure reduce weight, this scooter has different fuel efficiency, better fuel economy than the previous version.

=== Philippine market ===
All Yamaha Mios are produced by Yamaha Motor Philippines.

- Mio Fino
- Mio Soul MX, its only release was in 2009
- Mio Soul, Mio Soul i 115 and Mio Soul i 125
- Mio i 125
- Mio MX 125 and 125 MXi
- Mio Sporty/Soulty and Amore Limited Edition
- Mio Aerox 155
- Mio Gravis (FreeGo)
- Mio Fazzio
- Mio Gear

"i" = fuel injected

MIO MIO 125i

=== Indonesian market ===
All Yamaha old and new model range are produced by PT Yamaha Indonesia Motor Manufacturing.

- Mio Sporty (renamed smile after 2008)
- Mio Soul, Soul GT 115 and Soul GT 125 (discontinued production since 30 June 2022)
- Mio Amore (Sporty) Limited Edition
- Mio J 115
- Mio GT 115
- Mio M3 125
- Mio Z 125 (mio M3 wide tyre)
- Mio S 125 (led headlight)
- XRIDE 115 and XRIDE 125 (semi adventure)
- Mio Fino 125
- XEON RC, Aerox 125 LC and XEON GT (discontinued since 2016 and replace Lexi 125 from based engine Aerox/NVX 125vva since 2018)
- FreeGo (12 inch tyre based on mio m3 engine with difference crankcase)
- GEAR 125 (based on mio S body used engine freego)
- Fazzio

=== Malaysian market ===
All Yamaha Ego old and new range are produced by Hong Leong Yamaha Motor Sdn. Bhd. (HLY).

- Ego 115cc (2004–2008)
- Ego S 115cc (2007–2011)
- Ego S Fi/Injection 125cc (YMjet-Fi)
- Ego LC 125cc
- Ego Avantiz 125cc (2017–2025)
- Ego Solariz 125cc (2017–2022)
- Ego Gear 125cc (2022–Present)

=== Other markets ===
- Yamaha Mio Ultimo
- Yamaha Luvias
- Yamaha Mio ZR
- Yamaha Neo 125
- Yamaha GT 125
- Yamaha Mio MX

== Gallery ==
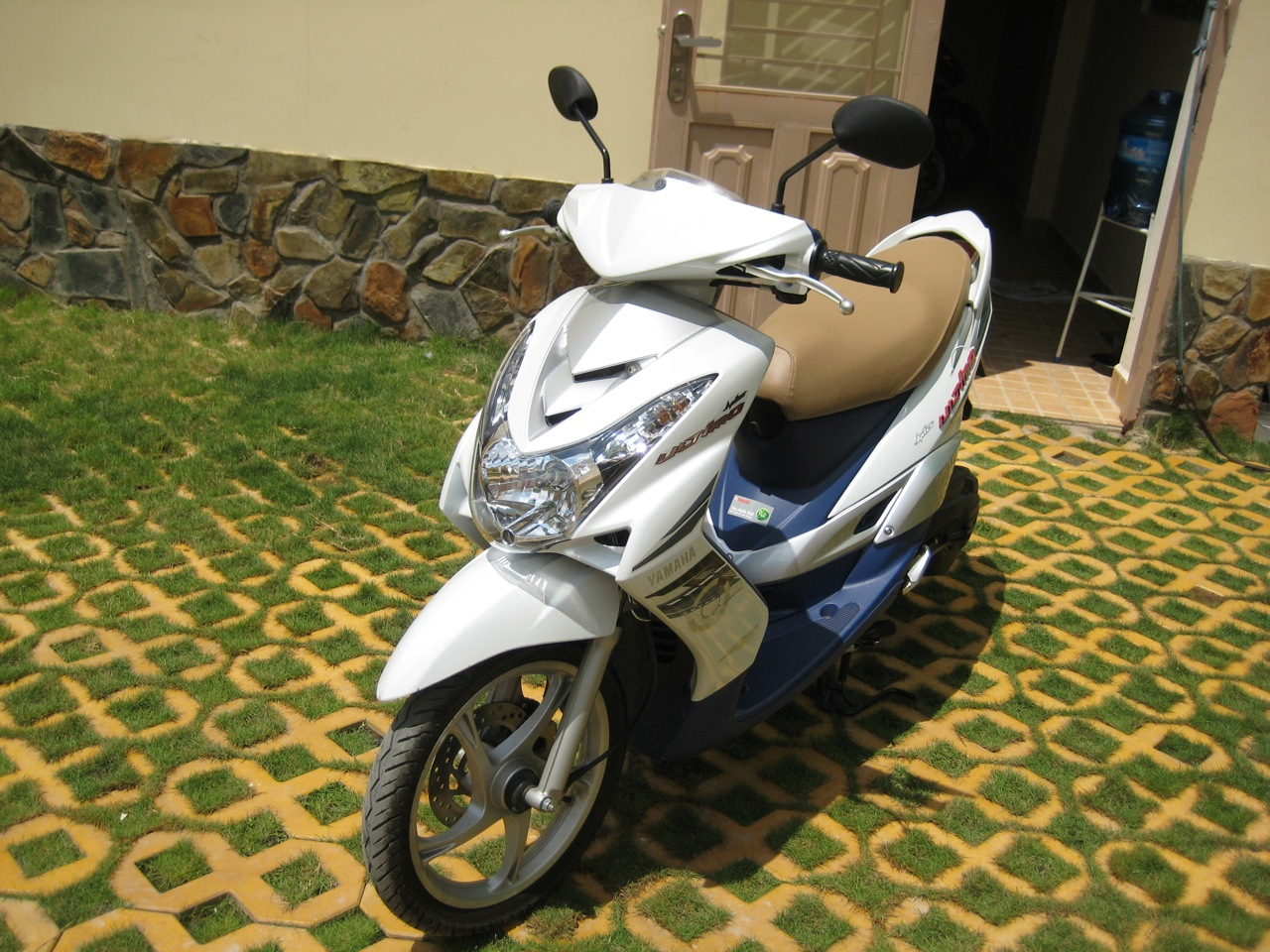
Yamaha Mio Ultimo

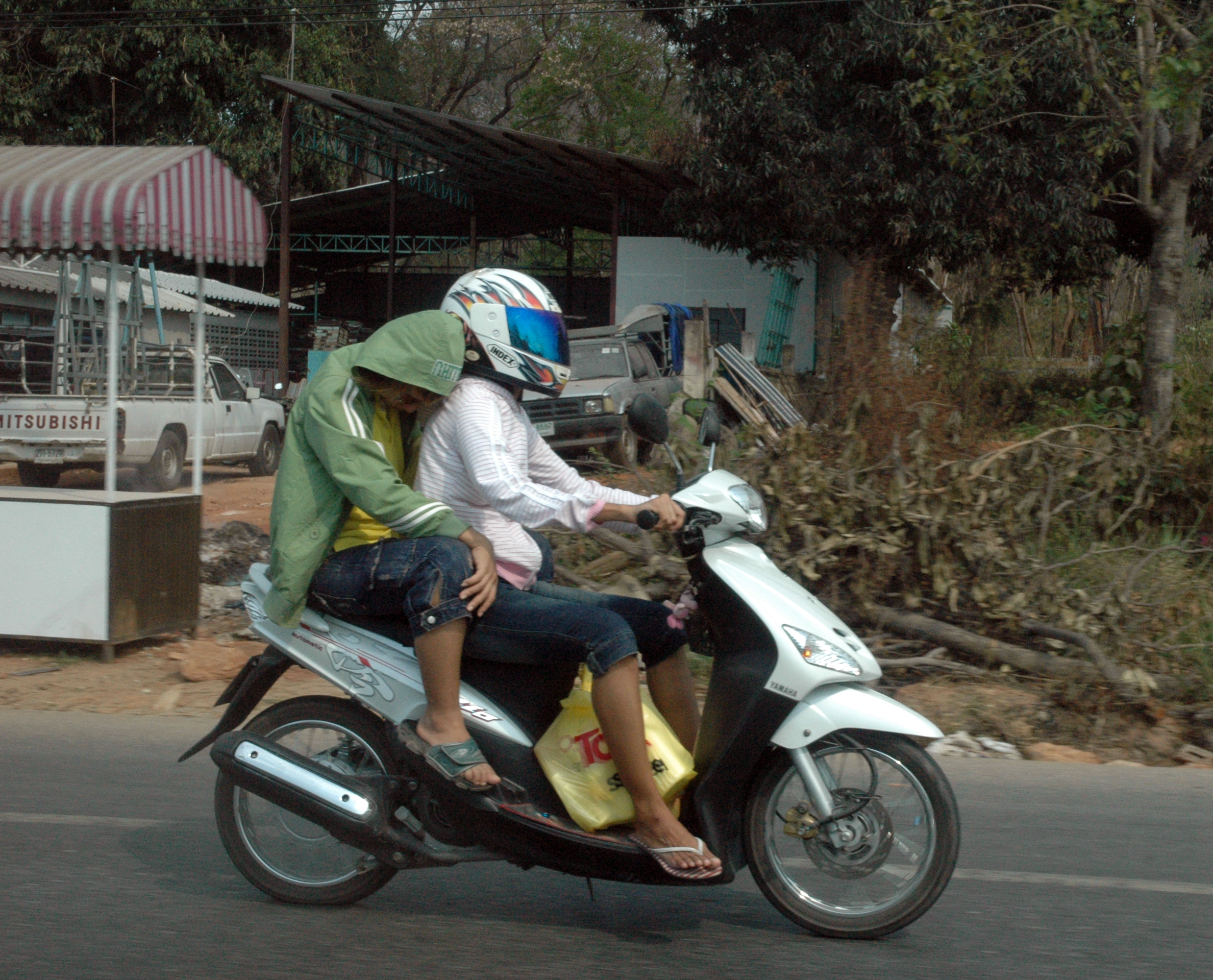
Yamaha Mio ZR

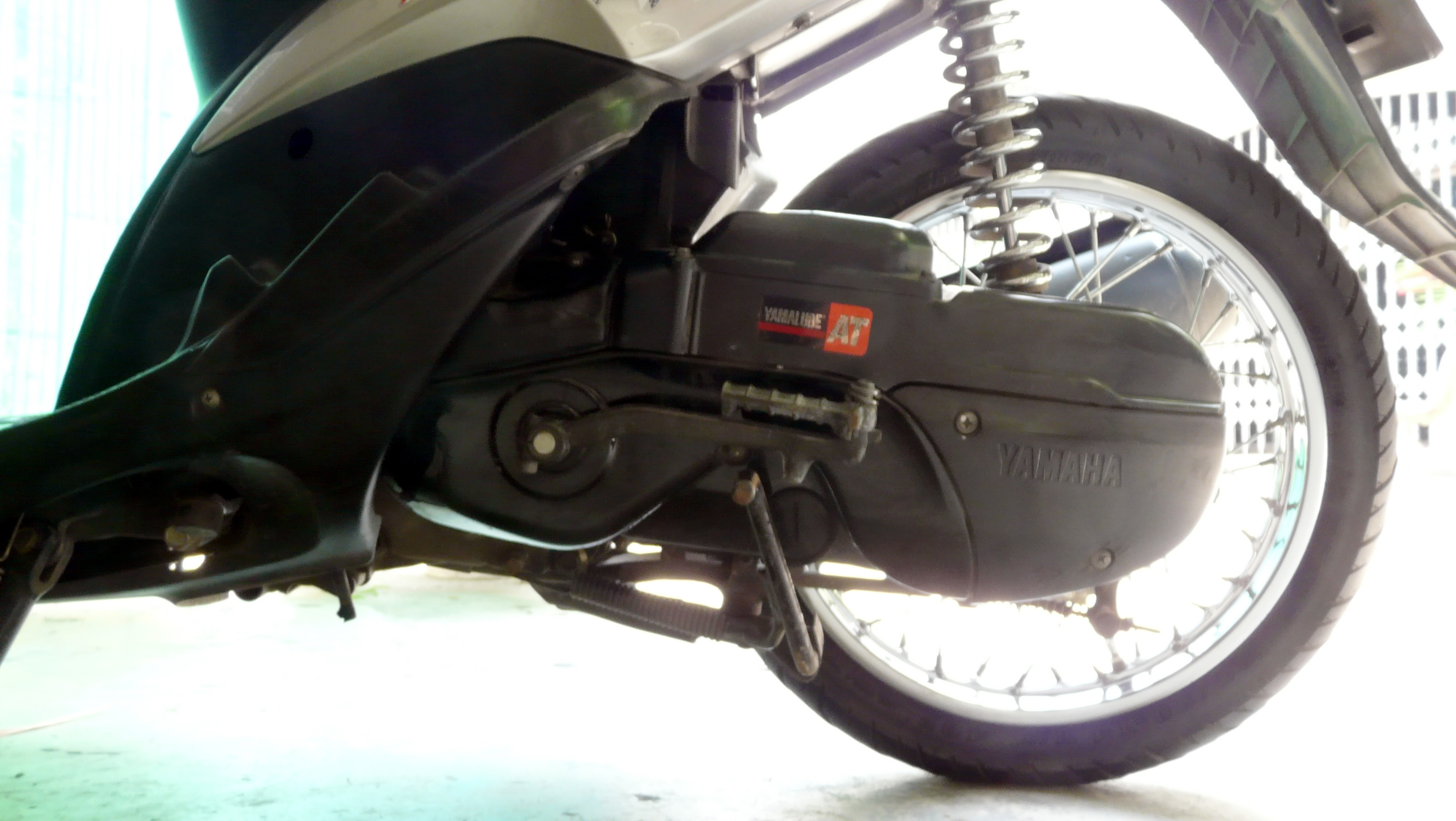
Yamaha Mio rear suspension

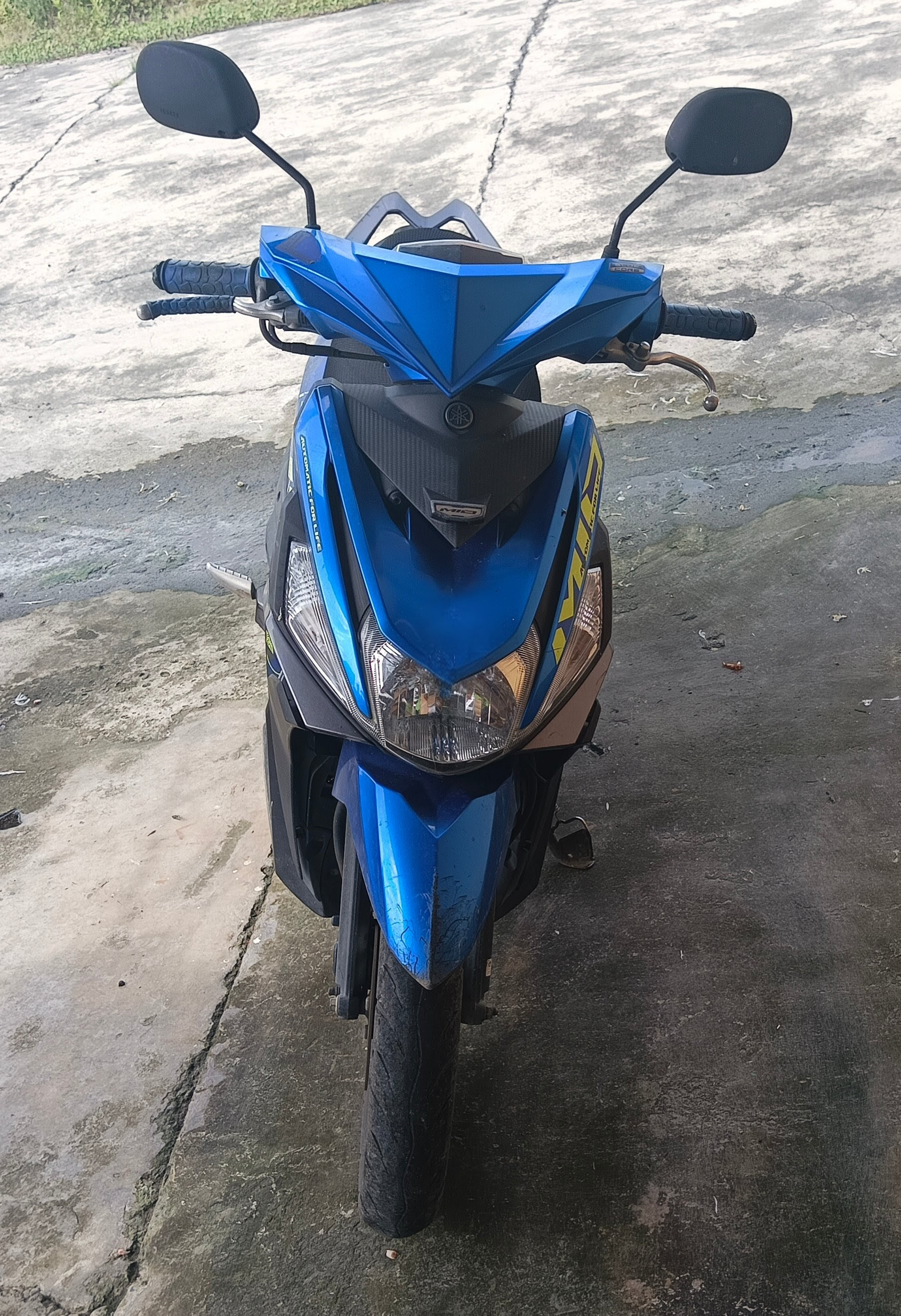
Yamaha Mio i25

== See also ==
- Scooter
