= Yamaha Vino 125 =

Scooter

Yamaha YJ125
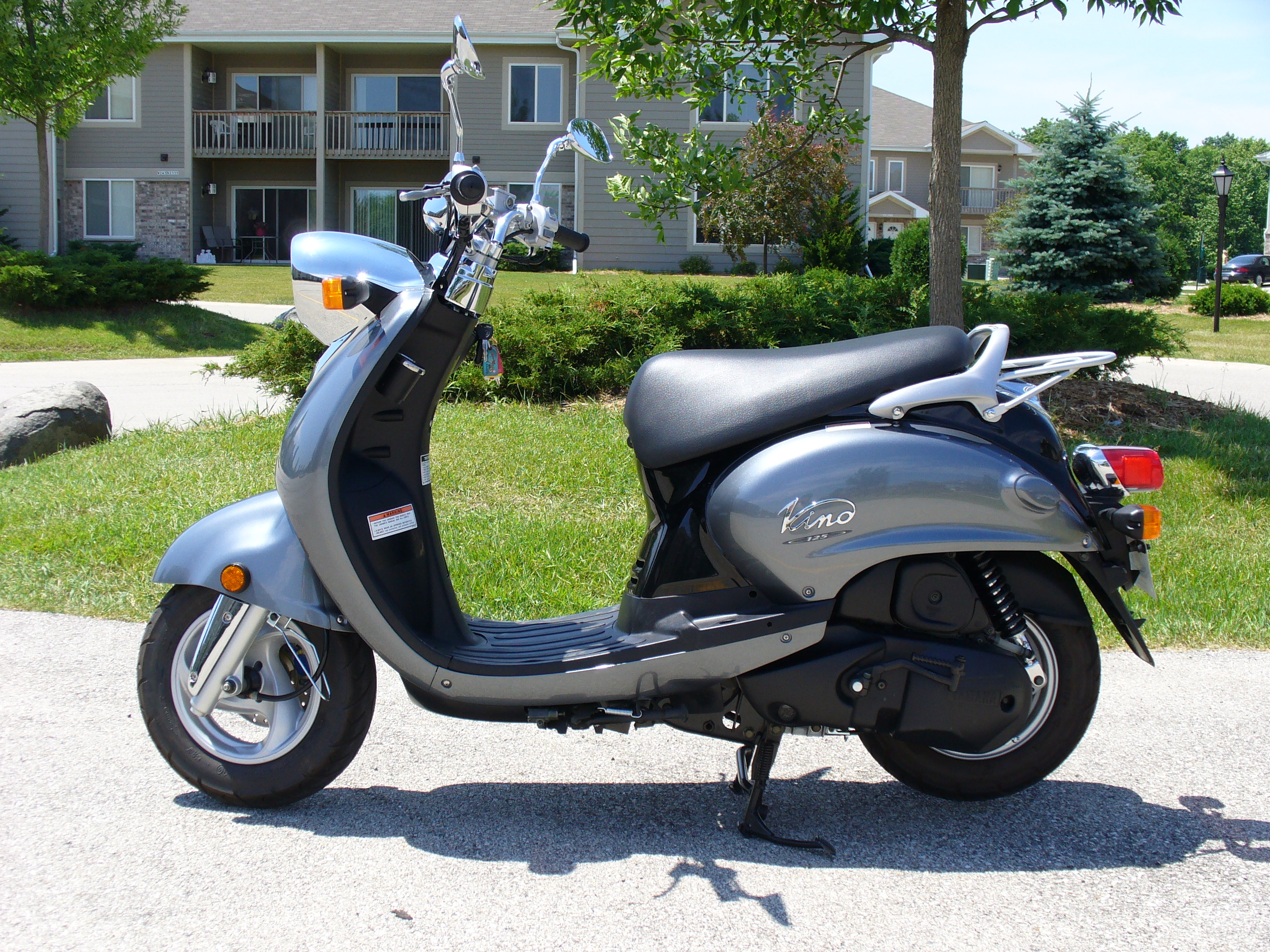
- Manufacturer: Yamaha Motor Company
- Also called: YJ125S, Vino 125, Fino 125
- Parent company: Yamaha Corporation
- Production: 2004–2009
- Predecessor: Yamaha XC125 Riva 125
- Class: Scooter
- Engine: 124 cc (7.6 cu in) SOHC air-cooled four-stroke single;
- Bore / stroke: 51.5 mm × 60.0 mm (2.03 in × 2.36 in)
- Compression ratio: 9.8:1
- Top speed: 89 km/h (55 mph)
- Transmission: Centrifugal clutch; V-belt automatic CVT
- Suspension: Front: telescopic coil spring/oil damper Rear: swingarm coil spring/oil dampener
- Brakes: Front: 180 mm disc Rear: 110 mm drum
- Tires: Tubeless Cheng Shin 3.50-10 51J
- Rake, trail: 32°, 75 mm
- Wheelbase: 1,229.4 mm (48.40 in)
- Dimensions: L: 1,752.6 mm (69.00 in); W: 698.5 mm (27.50 in); H: 759 mm (29.9 in)
- Seat height: 760 mm (30 in)
- Weight: 103.9 kg (229 lb) (dry); 109 kg (240 lb) (wet)
- Fuel capacity: 4.5 L (0.99 imp gal; 1.2 US gal)
- Oil capacity: 1.2 L (0.26 imp gal; 0.32 US gal)
- Fuel consumption: 4.2 L/100 km; 67 mpg_{‑imp} (56 mpg_{‑US})
- Related: Yamaha Mio

The Yamaha Vino 125 is a scooter introduced by Yamaha Motor Company in 2004 as a larger sibling to the 49 cc (3.0 cu in) Yamaha Vino/Vino Classic, replacing the Yamaha Riva 125 (XC125) scooter. Little has changed since the 2004 introduction of the Vino 125 with the exception of color choices. Because of the engine size and top speed, in many US States, the Vino 125 requires a motorcycle license to legally operate. The Vino 125 has a relatively low seat height, making it popular among smaller riders. The motorcycle was sold until 2009 in the United States (and 2010 in Canada.)

The Vino 125 has an air-cooled 124 cc (7.6 cu in) single-cylinder 4-stroke SOHC engine. The engine has a fan for supplemental cooling. It has a Mikuni BS carburetor with an auto-choke and carburetor heat device. Emissions controls are a catalyzed muffler, AIR Injection system, and an evaporative fuel canister. The braking system is a 180 mm (7.1 in) single disc front brake and a 110 mm drum rear brake. The tires are 3.50x10.

The Vino has a very similar counterpart in Thailand, called Fino, which looks almost identical.

Colors

- 2004: Dull Red Metallic, Stardust Silver, Fairy Silver, Black, Light Grayish Blue Cocktail
- 2005: Dark Purplish Red Cocktail, Black, Stardust Silver
- 2006: Deep Purplish Blue Metallic, Stardust Silver
- 2007: Deep Purplish Blue Metallic, Light Grey Metallic
- 2008: Deep Purplish Blue Metallic, Black Metallic
- 2009: Raspberry Metallic, Silver
- 2010 (Canada Only): Metallic Black, Metallic White

== Gallery ==
The picture below is a Yamaha Vino 50 but is so similar to the Vino 125 that it is hard to tell. The major difference is the overall width as well that the rear luggage rack is much more substantial in overall size on the Vino 125. The Vino 125 also has a large, rear, hand holding rail.

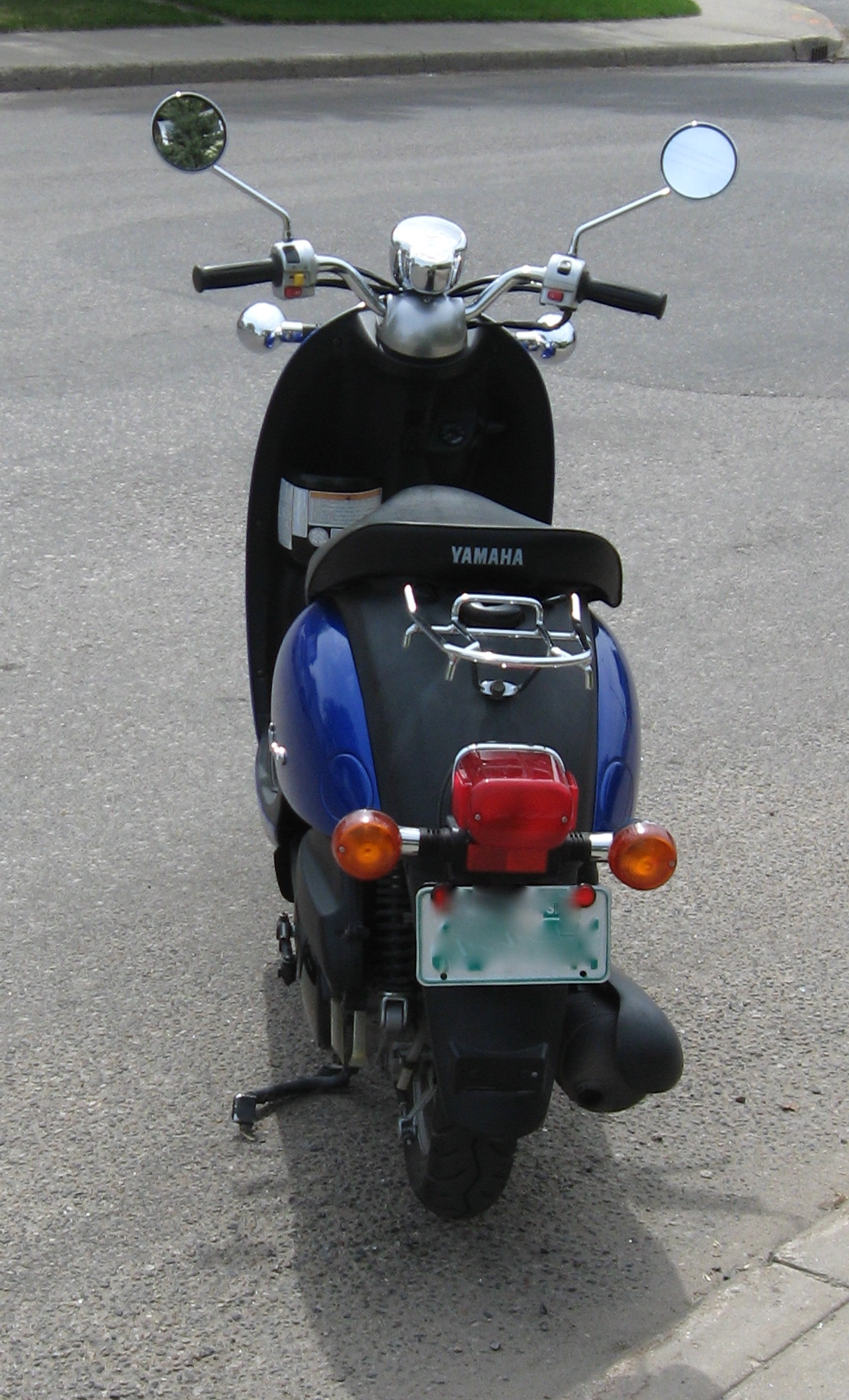
Rear view
