= Yamaha Nouvo =

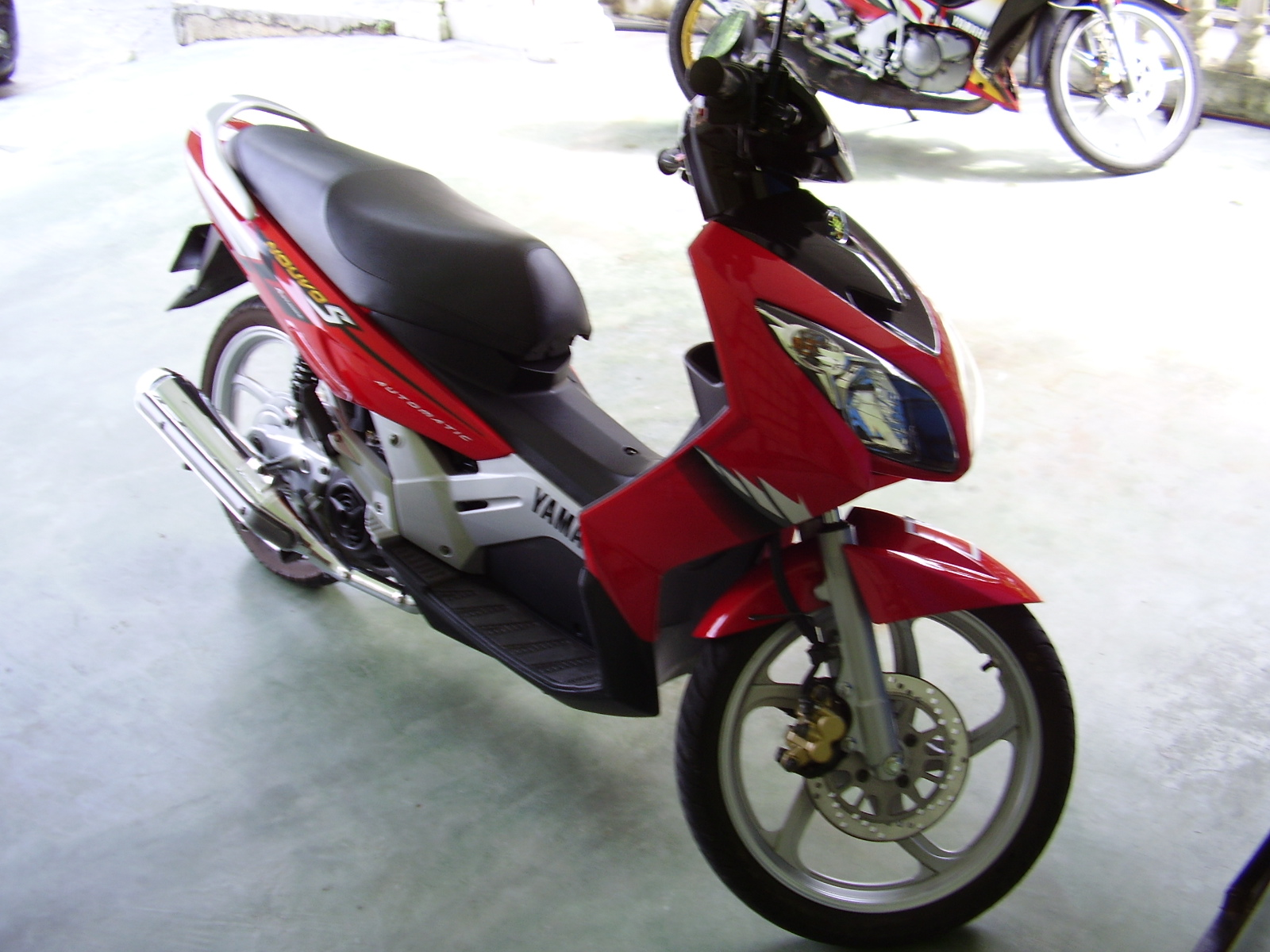
- Yamaha Nouvo S
- Manufacturer: Yamaha Motor Co., Ltd.
- Also called: Yamaha Nouvo S in Malaysia; Yamaha Nouvo MX in Thailand; Yamaha Nouvo RC in Vietnam; Yamaha Nouvo Z in Indonesia and Philippines; Yamaha Neo in Brazil; Yamaha Next in Colombia
- Production: 2002-present
- Successor: Yamaha Nouvo Elegance; Yamaha Nouvo LX; Yamaha Nouvo LC
- Class: Underbone
- Transmission: CVT
- Related: Yamaha Mio

The Yamaha Nouvo is a CVT underbone manufactured by Yamaha Motor. It was introduced in April 2002 for Southeast Asia markets and In 2004, Brazil, where it was renamed the Yamaha Neo. Nouvo is from the French word Nouveau, which means new or fashionable.

== Model history ==
=== 2002 ===
The Nouvo was developed under the model code "AT115" and in April 2002, and marketed in Malaysia, Indonesia, Thailand and other ASİAN countries.

Yamaha engineers intended to develop the frame with the same or higher level of rigidity as a moped bike in order to achieve a moped-like ride and good handling performance but also have the same level of comfort as a scooter. This vehicle is powered by a 4-stroke, SOHC 2-valve single-cylinder engine, giving it strong torque in the mid-to low-speed range.

=== 2004 ===
In 2004, the Nouvo was given a facelift by the Yamaha team. Part of the facelift includes headlights similar to the Yamaha YZF-R1 sport bike. For safety, the taillight also has been designed with the addition of a retroreflector device. In order to improve stability, the front suspension is also given new settings. Other cosmetic changes include the body panels and passenger footrest.

Yamaha Motor Company Vietnam has release a special edition model for their market in 2007, the Yamaha Nouvo Limited. It features a newly designed V-shape headlight and new body stripes, but the engine specifications are the same with all Nouvo series available (except for Nouvo Elegance). This model only comes in two colors, black or white.

As of 2008, Nouvo is still the best selling moped-like motorcycle in the Southeast Asia region especially in Thailand, Malaysia and Indonesia.

=== 2008 ===
In February 2008 the Yamaha Motor Company in Thailand and Vietnam launched an all-new version, the Yamaha Nouvo Elegance (LX in Vietnam) for their markets under the model code "AT135." Major changes in this motorcycle are the engine, with the displacement increased from 115 cc to 135 cc. In addition, the engine cylinder and forged piston are now made from die-cast aluminum silicon (DiASil), making it more lightweight and giving it a better power-to-weight ratio, to reduce engine overheating. The new model is also water-cooled, indicated by the addition of a radiator, installed at the right side of the engine. Cosmetic changes includes the body cover: sharper edges were added with larger seat. The Nouvo Elegance was also launched in Malaysia in August 2008 as the Yamaha Nouvo LC. The Nouvo Elegance model will also be released in Brazil in 2009 according to Yamaha.

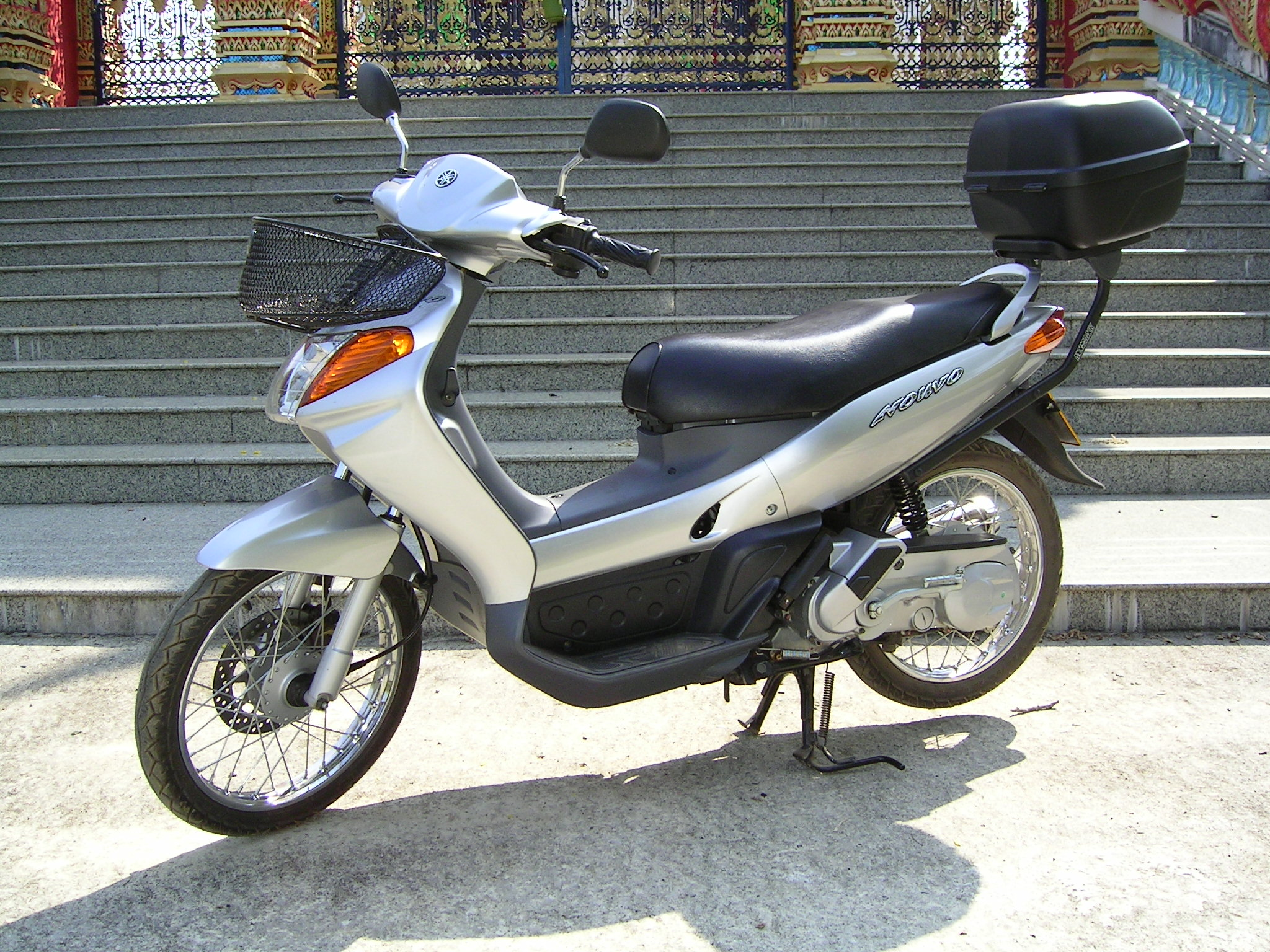
2002 Yamaha Nouvo with top box at the rear

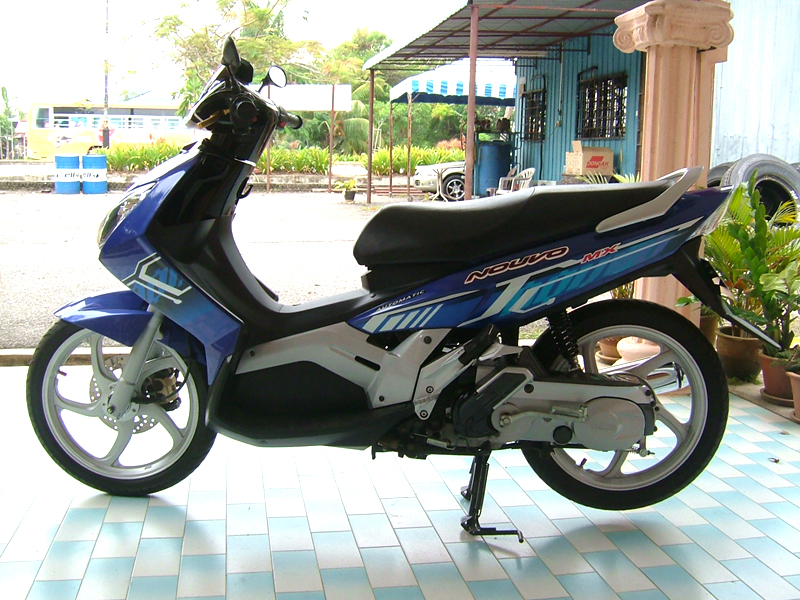
2006 Yamaha Nouvo MX

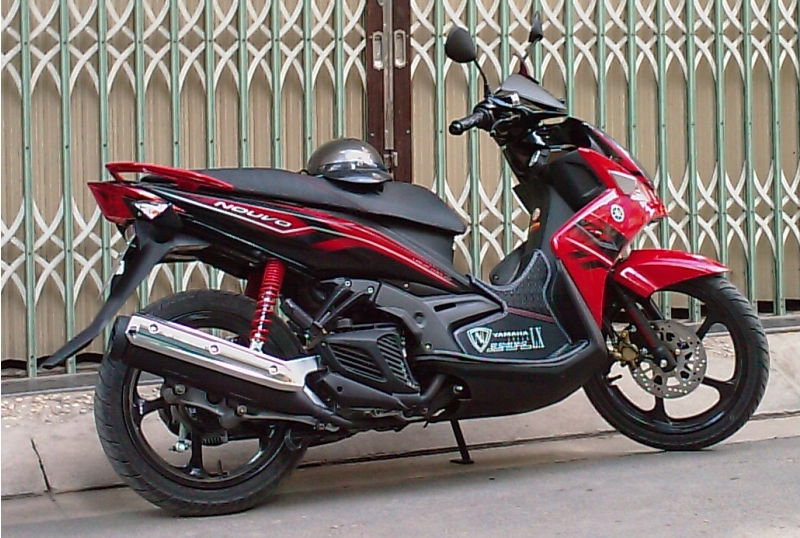
2008 Yamaha Nouvo LX-RC

== Modifications ==
Although Nouvos are not designed to be performance motorcycles nor hold any legitimate racing victories, they have been used for racing ever since their introduction. In 2003, several privateer and sponsored motorcycle teams in Malaysia entered the Nouvo for competition in the Malaysian Cub Prix Championship. In Thailand, the Nouvo is also being raced in underbone drag racing.

In recent years, the Nouvo has rapidly gained popularity as a platform for modification and customization (e.g: airbrushing or addition of onboard audio systems) by the enthusiast community, especially in Thailand and Malaysia. With a huge variety of aftermarket performance parts, including racing engine blocks, racing carburetors and fine tuning suspension kits to make the Nouvo quicker, it became popular in the legal and illegal street racing scene, to a point that it has become a subculture phenomenon, particularly in Southeast Asian countries.

== See also ==
- Underbones
