= NVX =

NVX may refer to:

- N-version execution environment (NVX) used for N-version programming
- Yamaha NVX, several motorscooters in the Yamaha Aerox lineup
- Novavax, a pharmaceutical company which uses the product code "NVX-"
- Invoxia, an electronics company which uses the model code "NVX"

== See also ==
- 1NVX, a protein configuration for HRAS
