= Yamaha Aerox =

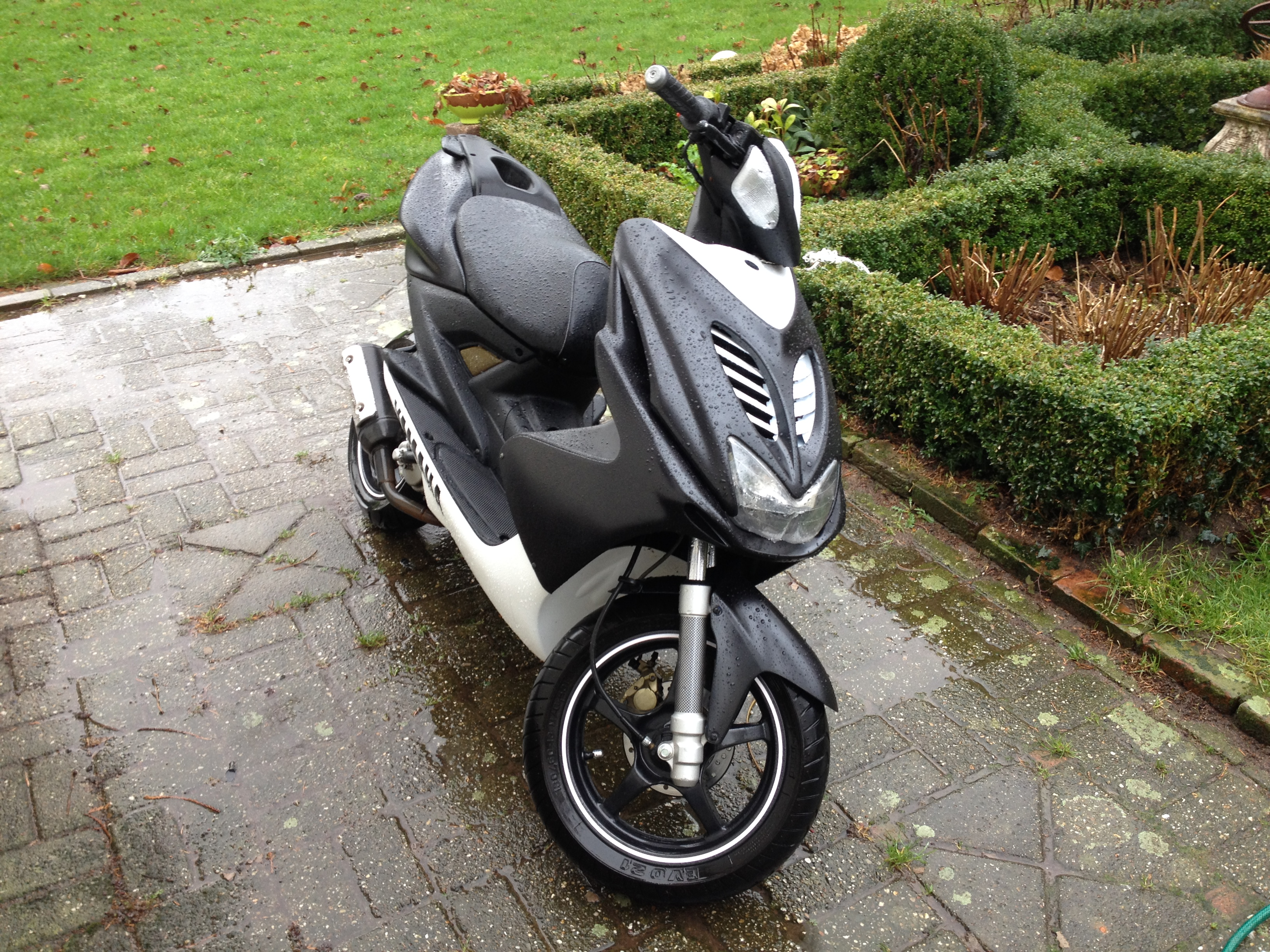
- 2011 Yamaha Aerox
- Manufacturer: Yamaha Motor Company
- Parent company: Yamaha Corporation
- Production: 1997–present (Europe); 2016–present (Southeast Asia)
- Class: Scooter
- Transmission: CVT

The Yamaha Aerox is a lineup of single-cylinder scooters made by Yamaha since 1997, available in either 50 or 100 cc for the European market, and 125 or 155 cc for the Southeast Asian and Indian markets. There are also several different body designs.

== Markets ==
=== Europe ===
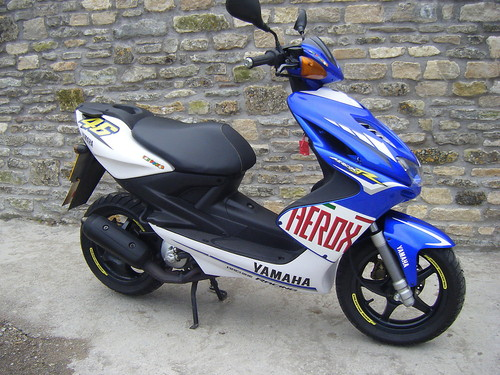
Aerox YQ50 Race Replica

Yamaha introduced the Aerox in the European market in 1997. It came in two models, the two-stroke 50 cc (internally known as the YQ50) powered by the Minarelli MA-50 horizontal Liquid cooled engine with a front and rear disc brake (DD). This model came restricted to 45 km/h (28 mph) from the factory to follow European law on 50 cc mopeds. The 101 cc YQ100 version is powered by a horizontal forced air cooled Minarelli two-stroke engine and features a single front disc and rear drum brake (SD). Both models came equipped with an automatic lubrication system with a separate oil tank for two-stroke oil.

Slight changes were made in 2003. The Aerox was renamed to Aerox R and the 101 cc model was discontinued. The two-stroke 50 cc model was updated with a newer exhaust, tachometer and a newer type of ignition and CDI. In 2013, Yamaha launched an updated Aerox with a revised body design and the introduction of the Aerox Naked and Aerox 4 (fitted with a 4-stroke engine, also of 50 cc).

=== Southeast Asia ===
==== Aerox 125 (2-valve) ====
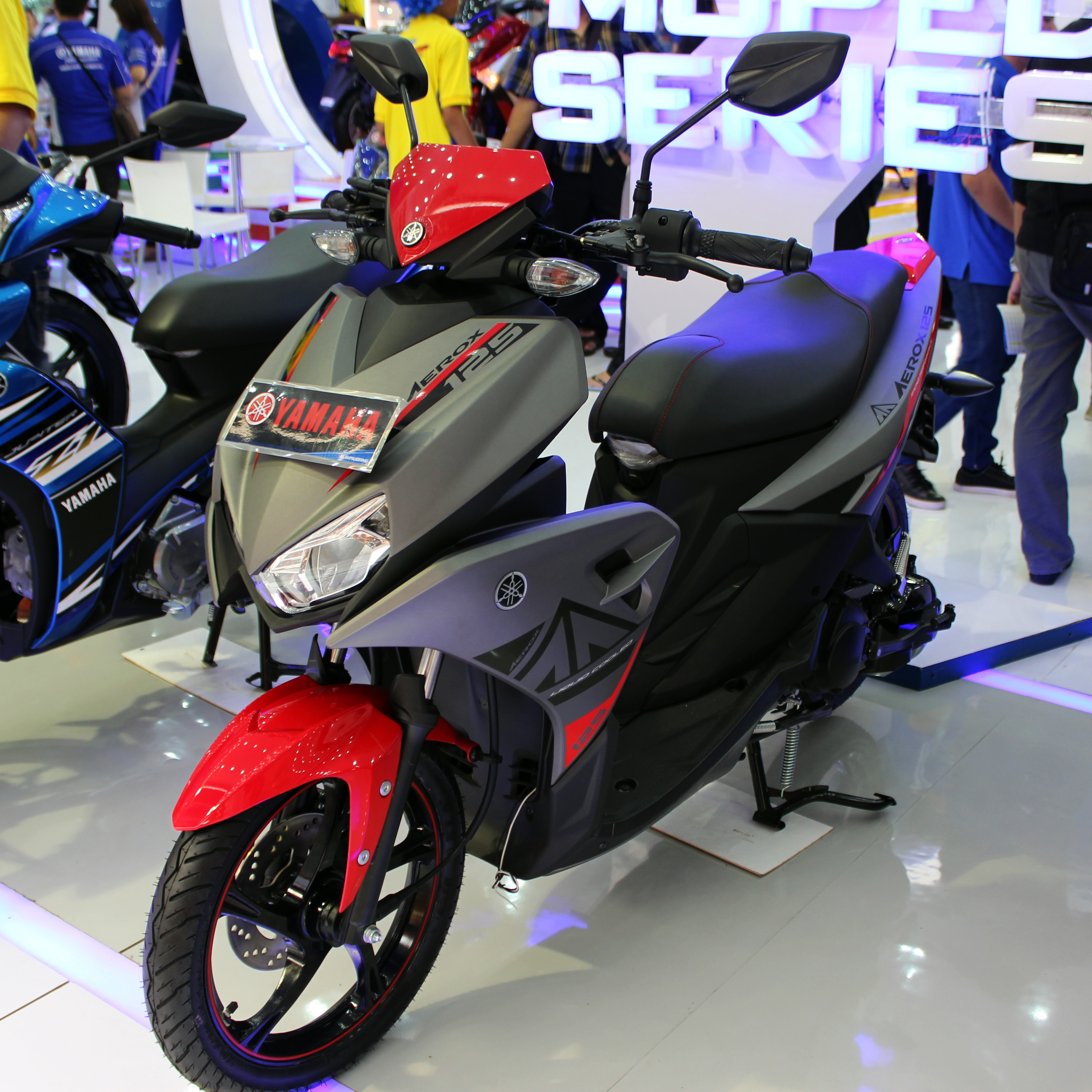
Aerox 125 LC

The liquid-cooled 4-stroke 2-valve 125 cc model of the Aerox was launched in Indonesia in January 2016 under the name Aerox 125 LC. It had a claimed power output of 8.4 kW (11.3 hp; 11.4 PS) @ 9,000 rpm and 10.4 N⋅m (7.7 lb⋅ft) of torque at 6,500 rpm. It was only sold in Indonesia and discontinued ten months later due to low sales. This model was succeeded by the 155 cc Aerox 155.

==== Aerox 125 (4-valve)/155 ====
The liquid-cooled, four-stroke, four-valve 125/155 cc versions of the Aerox (internally known as the GDR125/GDR155/GPR155) was unveiled at Sepang International Circuit in Malaysia in October 2016. It is powered by a 125 cc (unrelated to the engine used in Indonesian-only Aerox 125 LC) or bored-up 155 cc Blue Core engine equipped with Variable Valve Actuation (VVA) that produces a claimed power output of 8.8 kW (12.0 PS; 11.8 hp) or 11–11.3 kW (15.0–15.4 PS; 14.8–15.2 hp) respectively. These engines are shared with the NMAX. It is sold under the Aerox 155 name in Indonesia and Thailand and as the Yamaha Mio Aerox 155 in the Philippines, NVX 155 in Malaysia, NVX 125/155 in Vietnam, and Aerosports X 155 in China.

The Aerox 155 received its first facelift in November 2020 that included connected motorcycle technology. The second facelift Aerox, called Aerox Alpha, was launched in December 2024. The Aerox Alpha features a redesigned model and Yamaha Electronic CVT (YECVT) system marketed as "Turbo" which is shared with the third facelift NMAX.

Other than Southeast Asia, the Aerox 155 has also been made available in India since September 2021.

The battery electric variant named Aerox E was unveiled in India on 12 November 2025.

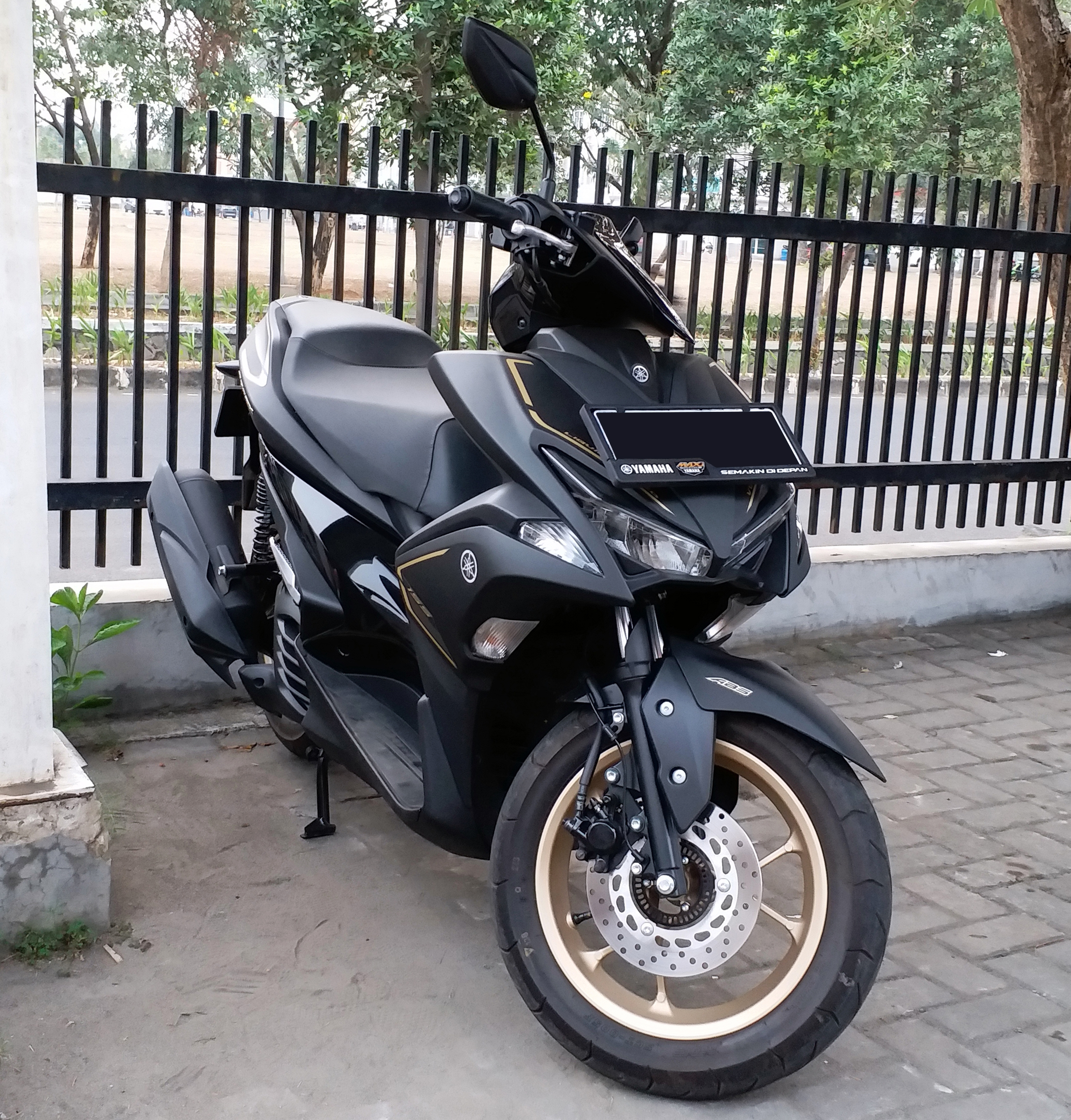
2019 Aerox 155 VVA

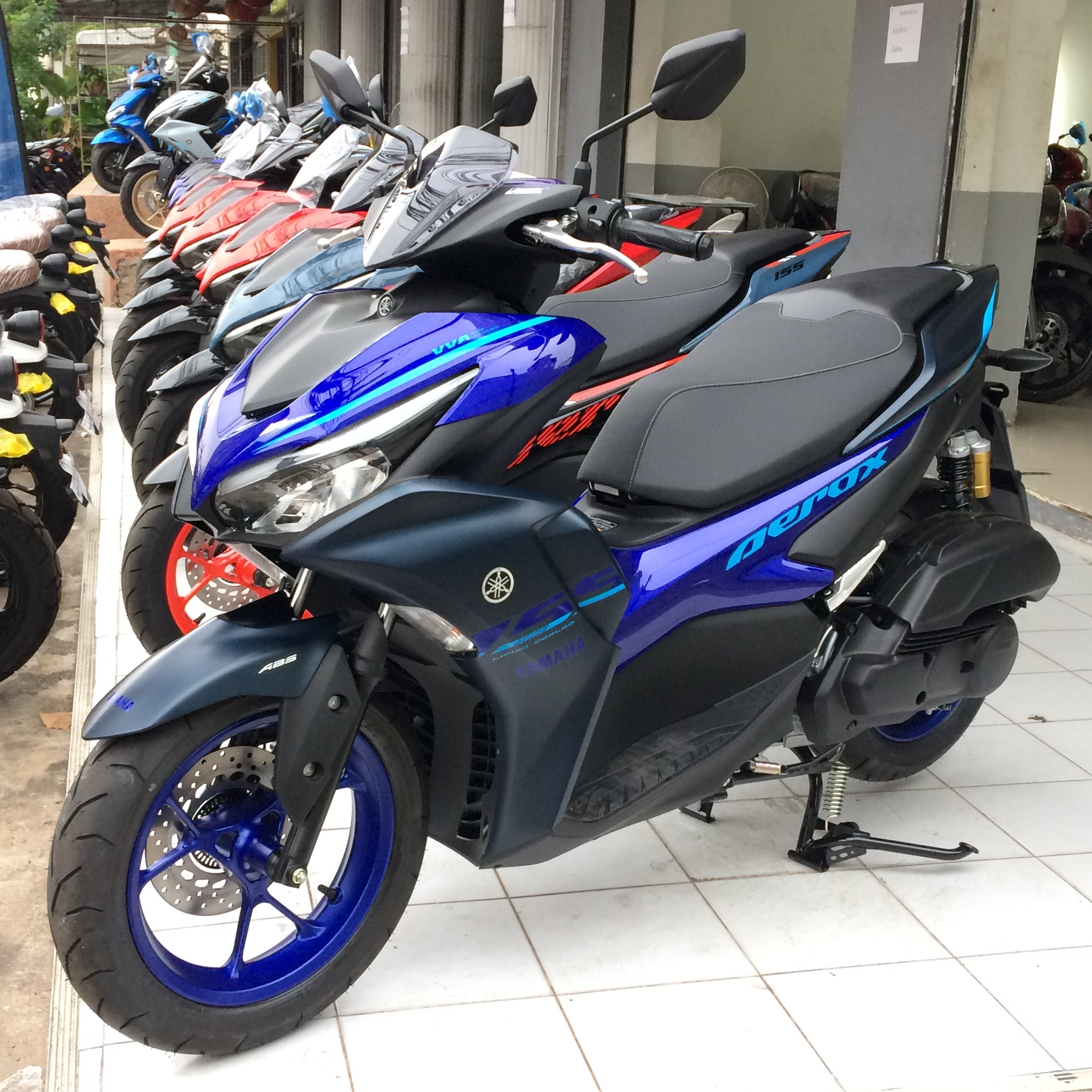
2022 Yamaha Aerox 155 ABS

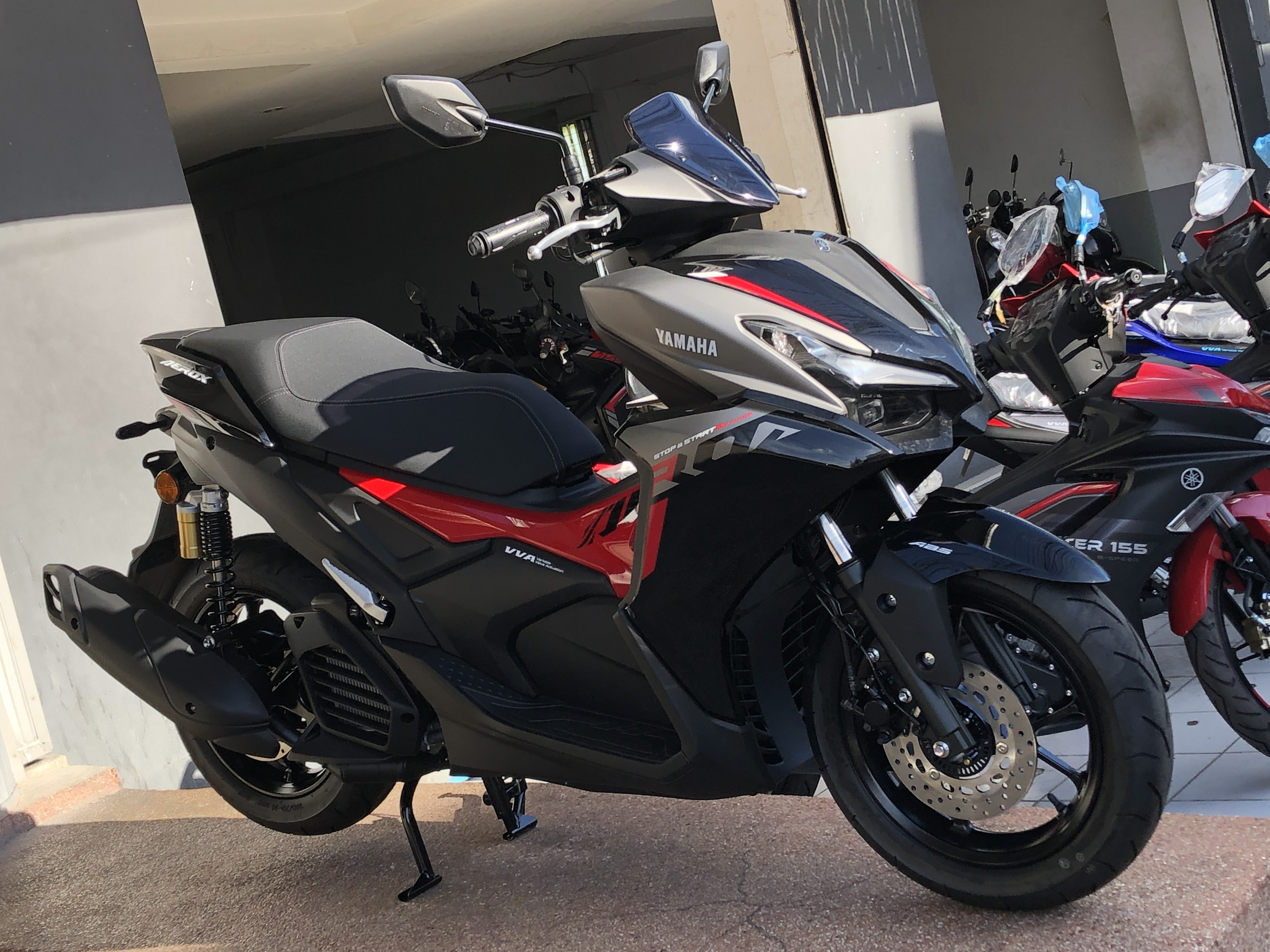
2025 Aerox 155 VVA
