= Yamaha NMAX =

Model of scooter

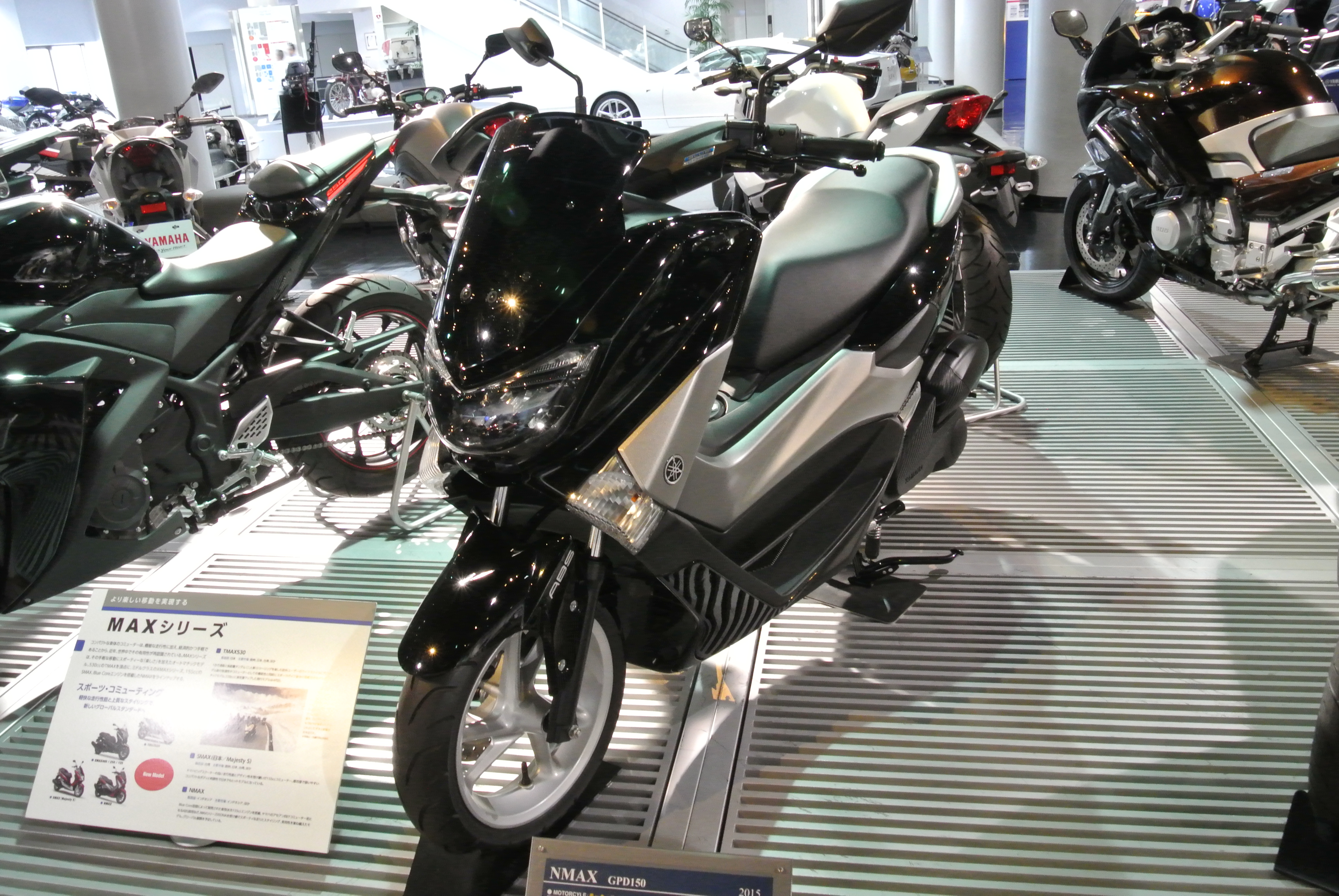
- Manufacturer: Yamaha Motor Company
- Also called: Yamaha NM-X; MBK Ocito (France)
- Parent company: Yamaha Corporation
- Production: 2015–present
- Assembly: Indonesia: Pulo Gadung, East Jakarta (PT Yamaha Indonesia Motor Manufacturing); Philippines: Malvar, Batangas (Yamaha Motor Philippines; since 2021)
- Class: Scooter
- Engine: 124.7 cc (7.6 cu in) liquid-cooled 4-stroke 4-valve SOHC single-cylinder (NMAX 125); 155.1 cc (9.5 cu in) liquid-cooled, 4-stroke 4-valve SOHC single-cylinder (NMAX 155/160)
- Bore / stroke: 52.0 mm × 58.7 mm (2.0 in × 2.3 in) (NMAX 125); 58.0 mm × 58.7 mm (2.3 in × 2.3 in) (NMAX 155/160)
- Compression ratio: 11.2:1 (NMAX 125); 10.5:1 (NMAX 155/160)
- Transmission: CVT, belt end drive
- Suspension: Front: Telescopic fork; Rear: Swingarm with double shock absorbers
- Brakes: Front: Single-piston caliper with single 230 mm (9.1 in) disc; Rear: Single-piston caliper with single 230 mm (9.1 in) disc
- Tires: Front: 110/70–13; Back: 130/70–13
- Wheelbase: 1,350 mm (53.1 in)
- Dimensions: L: 1,955 mm (77.0 in); W: 740 mm (29.1 in); H: 1,115 mm (43.9 in)
- Seat height: 765 mm (30.1 in)
- Fuel capacity: 6.6 L (402.8 cu in)

The Yamaha NMAX is a maxi scooter produced by Yamaha since 2015. It was officially launched in February 2015 at the Sentul International Circuit in West Java, Indonesia. The scooter's production base is in Indonesia and has been exported to various countries as Yamaha's global scooter model.

== Model updates ==
=== 2017 ===
In December 2017, Yamaha released a minor update to the NMAX 155, which was marketed as the 2018 model. This update featured several changes, including a new speedometer design, a different colour for the gold wheels on certain colour variants, modifications to the seat design, and the addition of an external oil tank to the rear shock absorbers. These changes were only applicable in Indonesia; in other countries, the model remained unchanged.

=== 2019 ===
In December 2019, Yamaha issued a major change from the NMAX 155 which was marketed as the 2020 model.

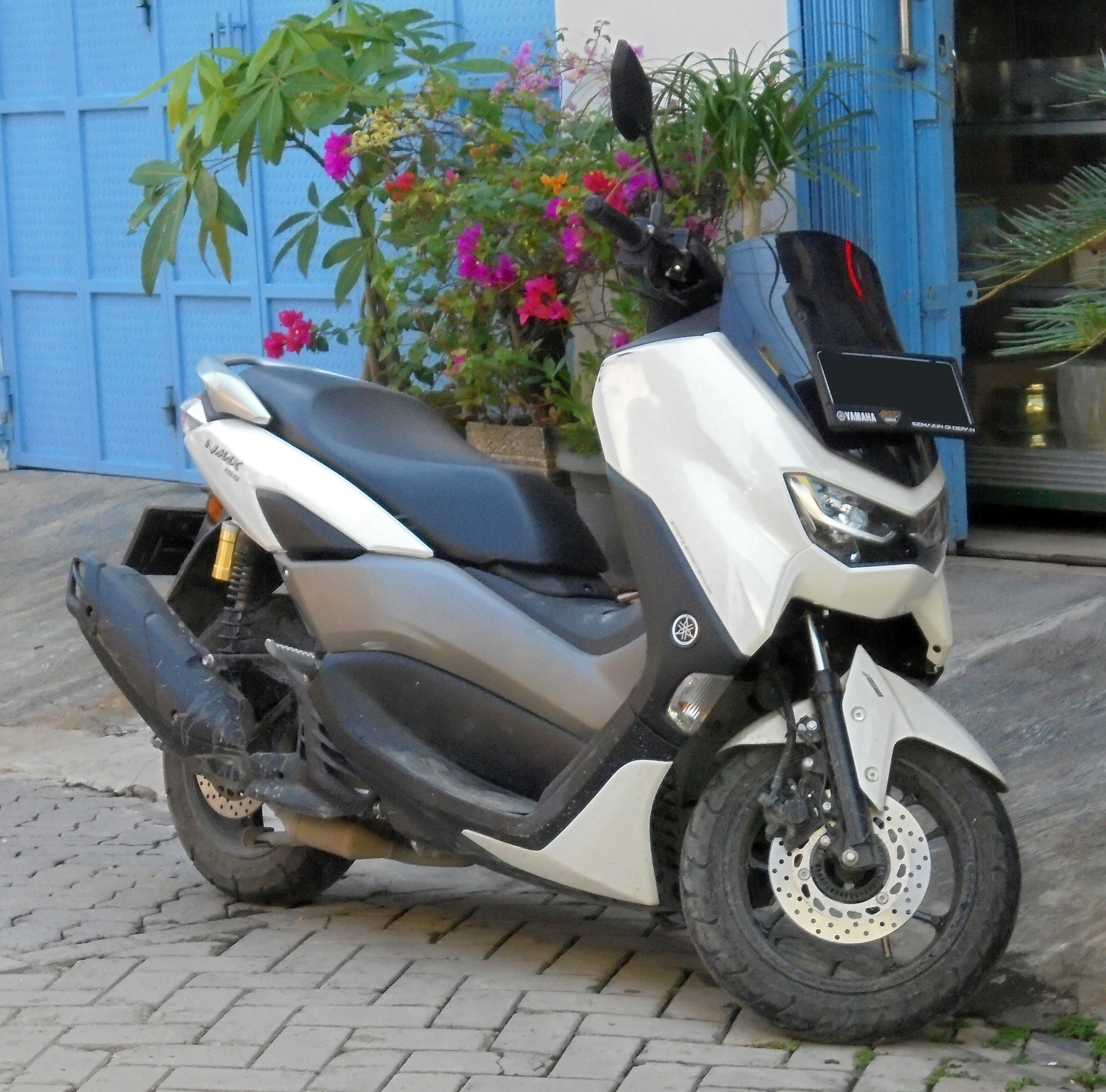
2020 Yamaha NMAX

=== 2024 ===
The NMAX received its third update in June 2024. This update includes a new model and additional features such as YECVT (Yamaha Electric CVT) on higher models which then will be named NMAX Neo (non-YECVT model) and NMAX "Turbo (this model is only sold in Indonesia).

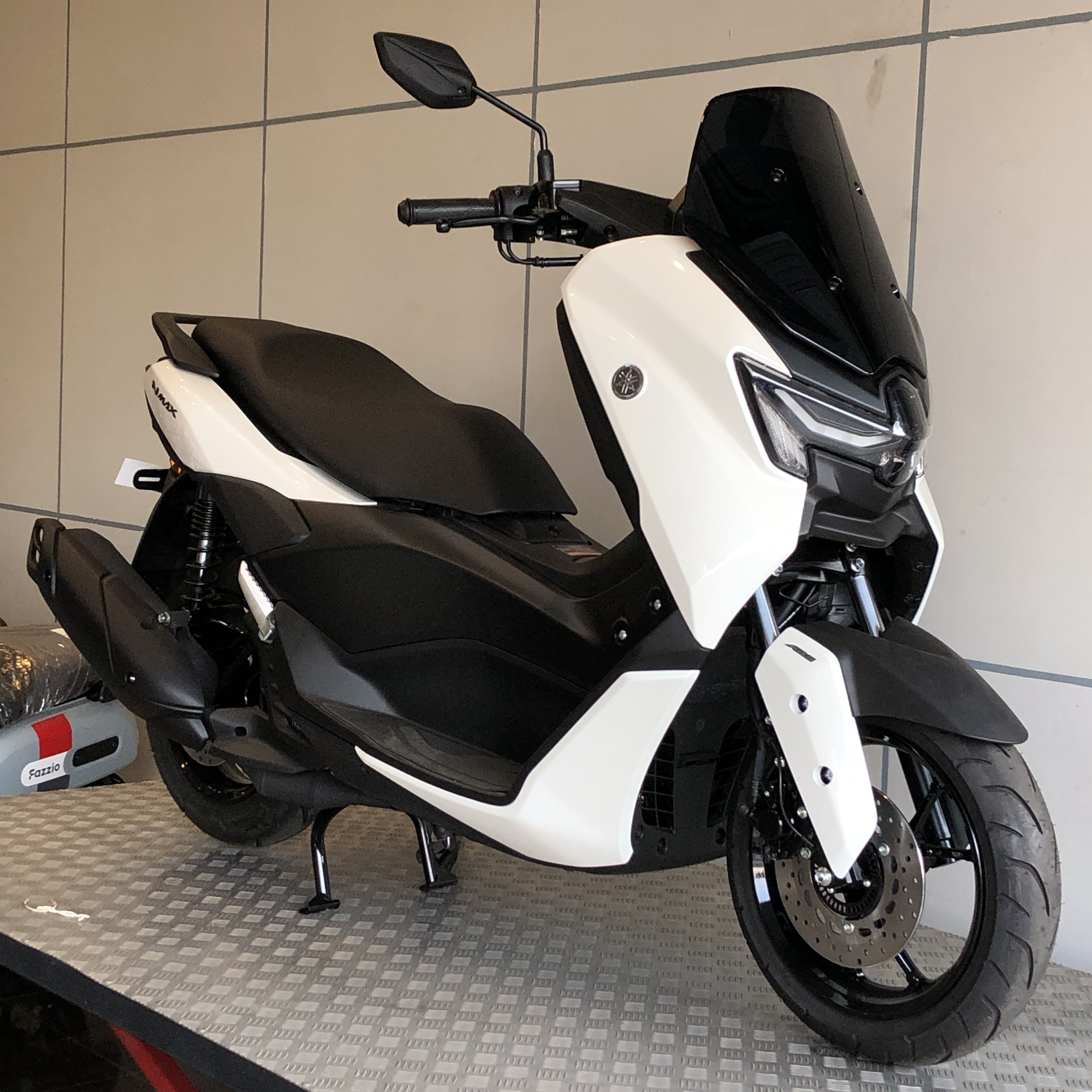
2025 Yamaha NMAX

=== NMAX E ===
The battery electric version, called NMAX E, was introduced in November 2026.

NMAX E

== Engines and specifications ==
The original 155 cc NMAX featured Yamaha's BLUE CORE engine technology, which was designed to improve combustion efficiency and fuel economy.

| | 2021 NMAX 125 | 2021 NMAX 155 |
Engine
| Engine Type | 125 cc (7.6 cu in) single cylinder four-stroke | 155 cc (9.5 cu in) & 197.7 cc (12.06 cu in) single cylinder four-stroke |
| Bore/Stroke | 52.0 mm × 58.7 mm (2.05 in × 2.31 in) | 58.0 mm × 58.7 mm (2.28 in × 2.31 in) |
| Compression Ratio | 11.2:1 | 11.6:1 |
Drivetrain
| Transmission | V-Belt Automatic | |
| Front Suspension | Telescopic fork | |
| Rear Suspension | Unit Swing | |
| Front Brakes | Hydraulic single disk brake | |
| Rear Brakes | Hydraulic single disk brake | |
| Front Tire | 110/70-13" | |
| Rear Tire | 130/70-13" | |
Electricity
| Ignition | TCI: Transistor Controlled Ignition | |
Dimensions
| Wheelbase | 1,340 mm (53 in) | |
| Length | 1,935 mm (76.2 in) | |
| Width | 740 mm (29 in) | |
| Seat height | 765 mm (30.1 in) | |
| Wet Weight | 131 kg (289 lb) | |
Performance
| Power Output | 9 kW (12 hp) @ 8000 rpm | 11.1 kW (15 hp) @ 8000 rpm |
| Torque | 11.2 N-m @ 6000 rpm | 14 N-m @ 6500 rpm |
| Fuel | 7.1 L (1.6 imp gal; 1.9 US gal) | |
| Fuel consumption | 2.2 L/100 km (128 mpg_{‑imp}; 107 mpg_{‑US}) | 2.3 L/100 km (123 mpg_{‑imp}; 102 mpg_{‑US}) |
| CO2 emission | 52g/km | 54g/km |
