= Facelift (product) =

Revival of a product through cosmetic means

A facelift is the revival of a product through cosmetic means, for example by changing its appearance while leaving its underlying engineering or design intact.

Web sites, magazines or other industries may also be facelifted, for instance when their titles and products appear dated.

The term probably comes from the same term used in plastic surgery.

== Purpose ==
It is commonly applied to many kinds of products to keep them competitive during a model's product life cycle and to increasing the sales revenue of products. To earn high sales revenue and profits for as long as possible with one product generation, one must enhance the product's attractiveness from time to time.

In automotive industry, the product lifecycle of mass-produced productions is always 4 to 6 years, and during that period, the competitor company will introduce new product to hold more market share. When new cars have launched into the market for 2 and 3 years, to keep their strength in the market, company will push out a facelift version to attract new and past customers to change their cars as they observe the sales revenue starts decreasing. This process is controlled by product life cycle management.

== Manifestation in Automobiles ==
In automobiles industry, facelift often be shown as a small change in its outlook, updating its engine output, adding some new equipment or creating a new edition etc.

== Sugar Water Gets a Facelift ==
A good facelift can bring an increasing revenue and a better reputation to the company.

In 2008, Coke, Pepsi Bottles try new sizes to pump up sales. While U.S. soda sales in major retail channels overall declined 3.5% in the first quarter, convenience-store sales dropped 4.2%, according to Beverage Digest, an industry publication. The 20-ounce bottle accounts for most convenience-store soda sales. To win back sales, several Coca-Cola and Pepsi bottlers are conducting pilot tests on a variety of bottle sizes they hope will appeal to consumers put off by the 20-ounce bottle or looking for a cheaper option to cushion the blow of high food and energy prices.

== Facelifts of websites ==
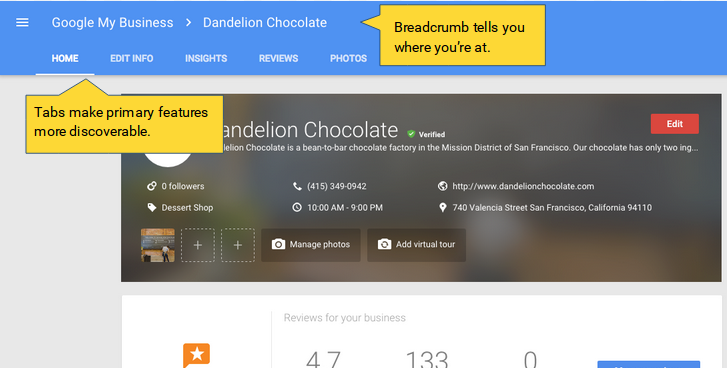

Facelifts of websites may take the form of changes in the appearance of the web, a new function being added, etc.

For example, to improve the GMB website, a new navigation panel was built to help users get less confused when navigating around in the dashboard.

Also, in response to the increasingly mobile nature of web usage, Facebook rolled out key updates to make Pages more mobile-friendly and user-friendly. To make Pages more mobile-friendly, Facebook has changed the layout to include tabs for each Page section – allowing a visitor to get the information they need in a streamlined fashion, while eliminating cumbersome scrolling and clicking.

When a website is not able to give the result people want, do not meet the modern functionality standards, and is not responsive and mobile-friendly, then it may need a facelift to improve the situation.
