= Yamaha Fino =

Yamaha scooter model

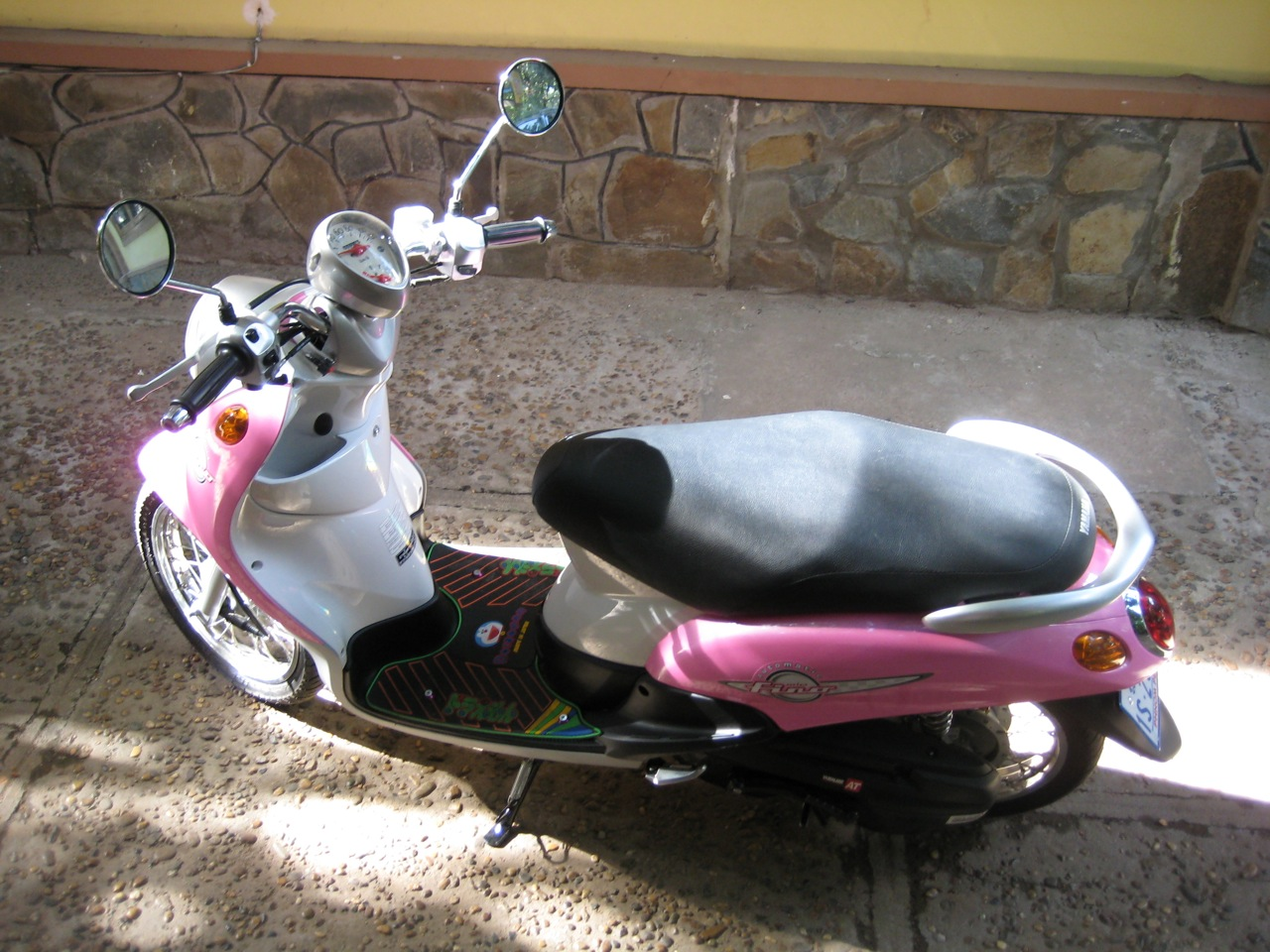
Yamaha Fino Bike in pink color scheme

The Yamaha Fino 115 is a scooter introduced by Yamaha Motor Company Thailand in 2006. The Fino 115 has a relatively low seat height, making it popular among smaller riders, as well as an air-cooled 115 cc single-cylinder 4-stroke SOHC engine.

Little has changed about the Fino 115 since its introduction with the exception of color choices.

For the 2019 model Yamaha Fino in Indonesia, new colors are included. There are 3 types available in the Indonesia market, Fino Grande with 2 color options, Fino Premium with 3 and Fino Sporty with 3.

The 2019 model year Yamaha Fino comes in 8 colors.

1. Fino Grande Luxury Red
2. Fino Grande Royal Blue
3. Fino Premium Caramel Brown
4. Fino Premium Black Expresso
5. Fino Premium White Latte
6. Fino Sporty Retro Green
7. Fino Sporty Classic Blue
8. Fino Sporty Vintage Red

The 2019 New Yamaha Fino now comes with a 125 cc Blue Core Technology engine (the same engine as the Mio M3).
