= Yamaha Libero (G5) =

Yamaha Libero G5
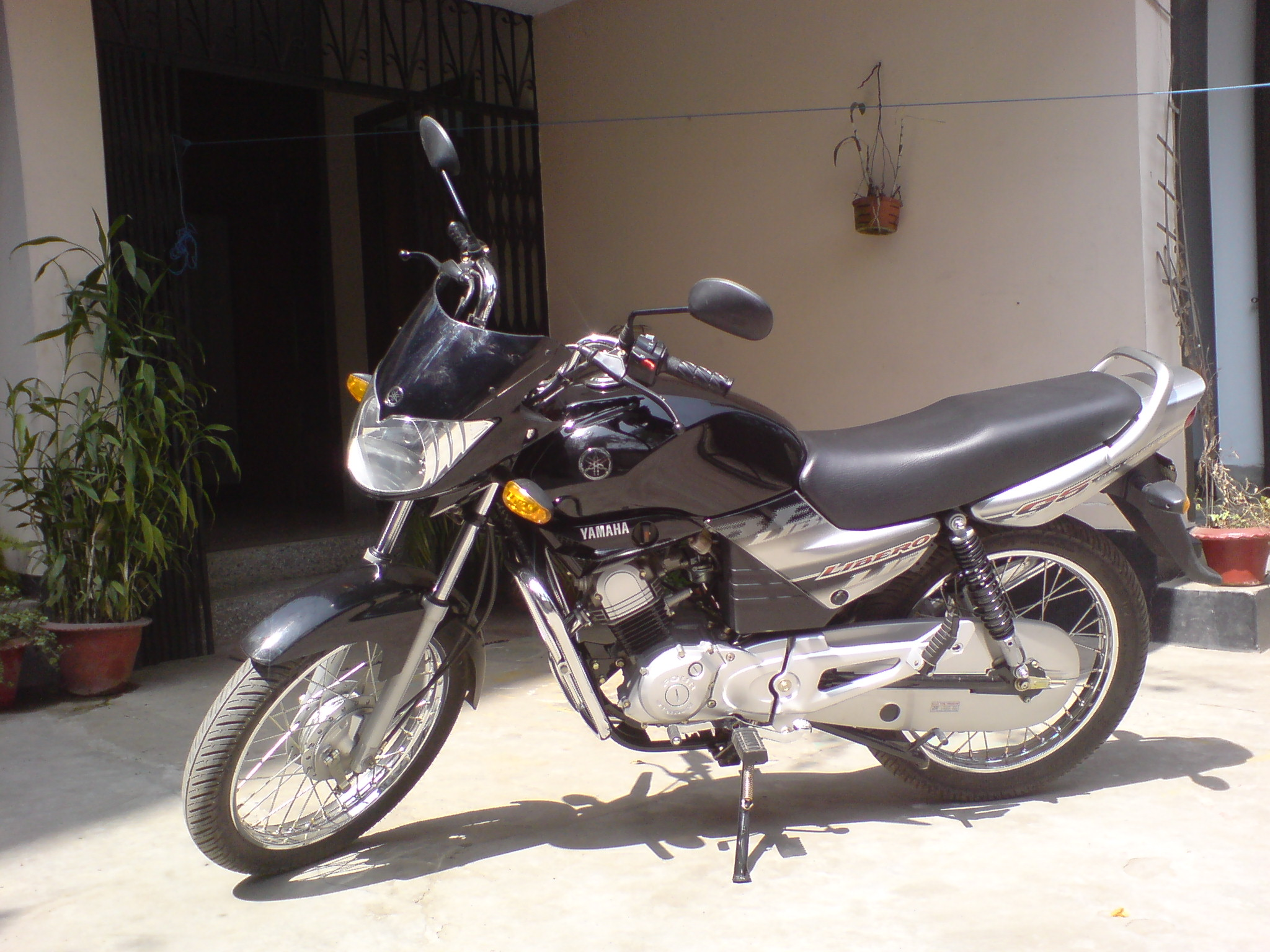
- 2006 model
- Manufacturer: India Yamaha Motor
- Parent company: Yamaha Motor Company
- Production: 2002 - 2010
- Predecessor: Yamaha Libero
- Class: Standard
- Engine: 106 cc (6.5 cu in), 4-stroke, air-cooled single
- Transmission: 4-speed manual
- Brakes: Drum
- Tires: Rear tyre: 3.00 X 18" 6 PR; Front tyre: 2.75 X 18" 4 PR
- Wheelbase: 1,290 mm (51 in)
- Dimensions: L: 2,000 mm (79 in); W: 730 mm (29 in); H: 1,050 mm (41 in)
- Seat height: 800 mm (31 in)
- Weight: 119 kg (with 90% fuel) (wet)
- Fuel capacity: 13 L (2.9 imp gal; 3.4 US gal)
- Related: Yamaha Crux; Yamaha Alba; Yamaha Gladiator

Yamaha Libero G5 is a 106 cc, single-cylinder four-stroke motorcycle manufactured by India Yamaha Motor. Its predecessor was known as just Yamaha Libero. Unlike Libero G5, Libero had tachometer and round headlights but lacked fuel gauge. However, Libero G5 came with a sporty headlight and fuel gauge, but lacked the tachometer. A new set of air scoops with a honeycomb grille do dual duty; directing airflow over the engine block and also neatly covering the gap between the engine and the fuel tank. The Libero G5's frame continues to be the tubular dual-cradle type.

Yamaha has introduced a compulsive pressure wet sump lubrication system in the 106 cc engine of the Libero G5. This new system works on a constant pressure build-up that is generated by the engine itself thus enables the engine oil or lubricant to flow evenly over all the engine components, unlike conventional lubrication that works more on gravitational forces thus may not perform as effectively.

Yamaha Libero G5 was, particularly, made for Indian market. However, in Bangladesh, Yamaha Libero G5 was also popular. Ground clearance is comfortable 173 mm, enabling the bike to take on speed-breakers and potholes with greater confidence.

Yamaha released an upgraded Libero G5 model with alloy wheels and electric starter in 2007. Like most Indian motorcycles, this bike came with a saree guard to increase the safety of female pillion riders. A less sporty-looking version (with same engine) of this bike is marketed as Yamaha Alba. A bigger cousin of this bike with 125 cc engine is Yamaha Gladiator. Some similar/competitor bikes are Hero Honda Splendor, Bajaj Platina, Bajaj CT 100. India Yamaha Motor stopped manufacturing Yamaha Libero G5 in the year 2010.

== Technical specification ==
Technical specifications below as reported by the manufacturer.

Engine type: Air-cooled, 4-stroke, SOHC, 2-valve

Cylinder arrangement: Single-cylinder

Bore x stroke: 49.0 x 56.0 mm

Compression ratio: 9.0:1

Starting system: Kick start/Self starter (from 2008 models)

Lubrication: Compulsive pressure wet sump

Carburettor: Variable venturi type

Ignition system: Capacitor discharge ignition (advanced micro processor), Magneto dependent

Battery type: 12 V, 2.5 A·h

Clutch type: Wet multiple-disc

Transmission type: Four steps of regular engagement formula advance. 1 down, 3 up; toe-heel shifter

Gear ratios: 1st=3.000, 2nd=1.688, 3rd:=1.200, 4th=0.875 Primary / Secondary reduction ratio 3.722 / 3.214

Frame type: Double cradle type

Caster angle (degree): 26.4°

Suspension type: (front/rear) Telescopic/swing arm

Headlight: 12 V 35/35 W halogen bulb (HS1)

Top speed: +/-87 km/h (54 mi/h) (with 80 kg payload)

Fuel efficiency: +/- 100 km/2 liters of gasoline
