= Yamaha SZ =

Yamaha SZ16
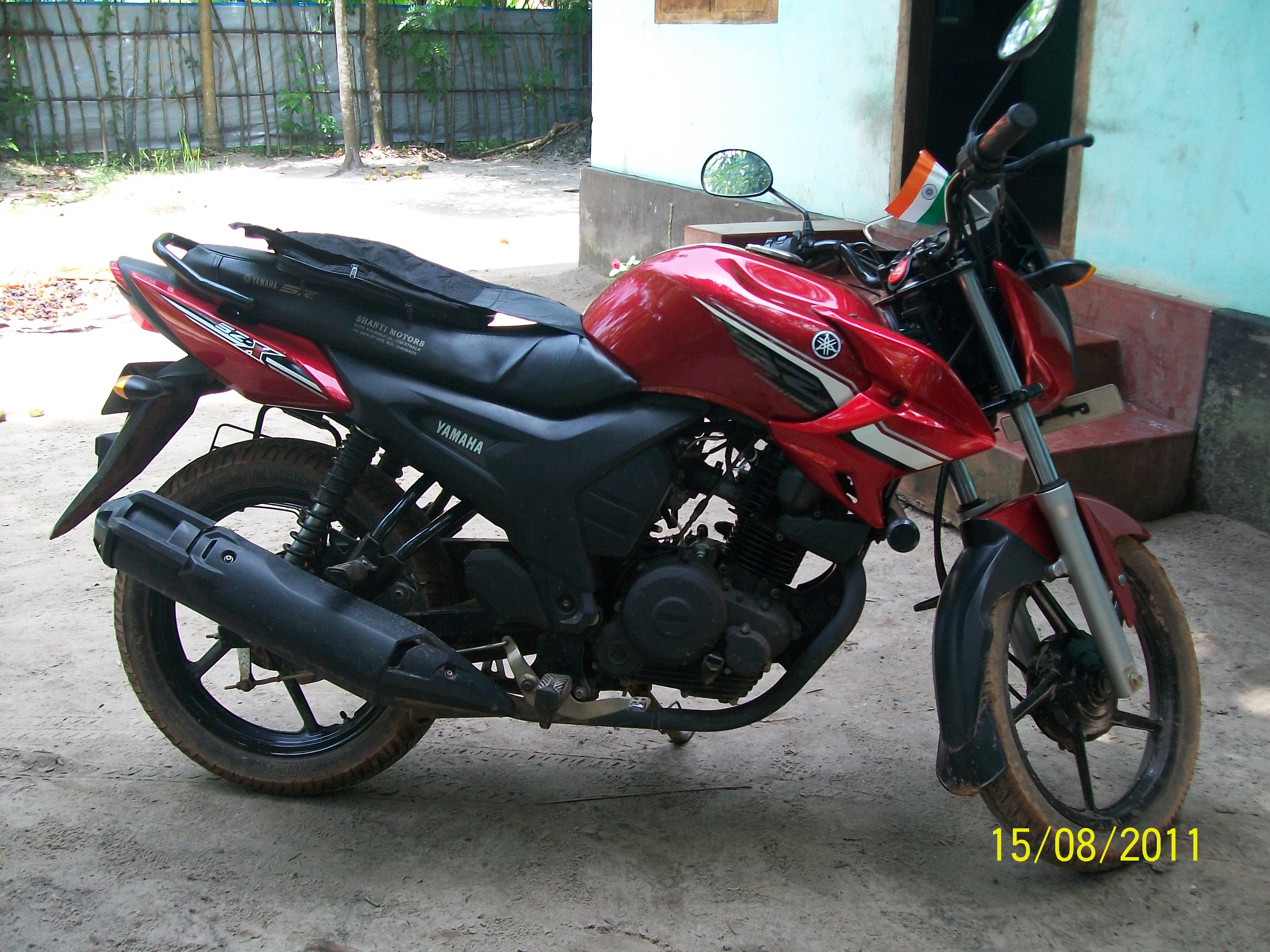
- Manufacturer: India Yamaha Motor
- Parent company: Yamaha Motor Company
- Assembly: India
- Predecessor: SS 125
- Class: Standard
- Engine: SOHC 153 cc (9.3 cu in) air-cooled, 4-stroke single
- Bore / stroke: 58.0 mm × 57.9 mm (2.28 in × 2.28 in)
- Compression ratio: 9.5:1
- Ignition type: CDI
- Transmission: Wet clutch, 5 speed
- Frame type: Diamond
- Suspension: Front: telescopic fork, Rear: swingarm
- Brakes: F: Hydraulic Disc, R: Drum
- Tires: Front: 2.75-17 41P; Rear: 100/90-17 55P
- Wheelbase: 1,320 mm (52 in)
- Dimensions: L: 2,050 mm (81 in); W: 730 mm (29 in); H: 1,040 mm (41 in)
- Seat height: 800 mm (31 in)
- Fuel capacity: 14L
- Oil capacity: 0.8L
- Fuel consumption: 14 L (3.1 imp gal; 3.7 US gal)
- Related: Yamaha SZ RR; Yamaha FZ16

The Yamaha SZ16 is a light motorcycle manufactured by the India Yamaha Motor. Introduced in 2010, it comes in naked as well as faired variants. It has a carbureted single-cylinder, air-cooled, four-stroke engine, displacing 153 cc (9.3 cu in).

A new model for the Philippine market was launched for 2015. The engine has a lower 149.3cc displacement. Minor changes were made as it is now equipped with a kill switch. The instrument cluster has also been redesigned. The passenger one-piece rear grab bar was replaced by a split aluminum grab bar. It is offered in 3 color options: vivid red, dark purplish blue metallic and matte black.
