= Bajaj Kawasaki Wind 125 =

Bajaj Wind 125
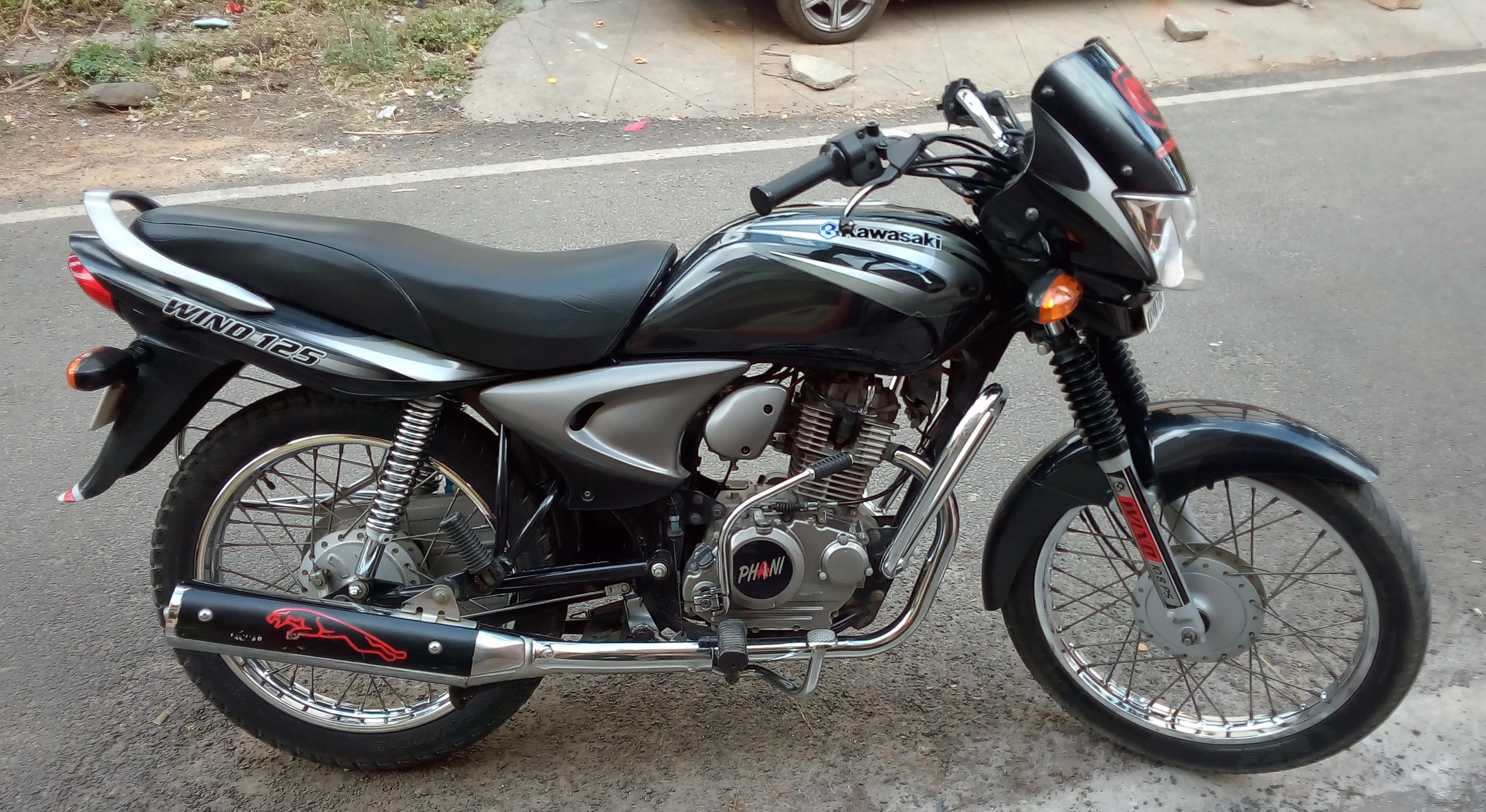
- Manufacturer: Kawasaki (distribution in India by Bajaj)
- Also called: Kawasaki Wind 125
- Production: 2003-2006
- Successor: Bajaj Platina
- Class: Executive
- Engine: 124.6 cc (7.60 cu in) K-TEC Engine, air-cooled, four-stroke cycle, single, kick start
- Transmission: 5-speed manual
- Suspension: Hydrodynamic (HDS) suspension
- Brakes: 240mm hydraulic disc front (optional); 130mm drum rear
- Wheelbase: 1,260 mm (50 in)
- Dimensions: L: 2,025 mm (79.7 in); W: 740 mm (29 in); H: 1,115 mm (43.9 in)
- Fuel capacity: 13 L (2.9 imp gal; 3.4 US gal) (2 L (0.44 imp gal; 0.53 US gal) reserve)

The Bajaj Wind 125 is a standard motorcycle by Bajaj Auto. It was designed with intent to be used by middle class urban riders in India, and for tricycle and delivery business in the Philippines. It is now no longer in production for the Indian market, though the bike is made for the export market.

== Overview ==
The Bajaj Wind125 was Kawasaki's entry into the Southeast Asian markets such as Thailand, Taiwan, and Indonesia, where the entry level bike is a 125 CC (rather than 100 CC, as in India, where Bajaj is based). After discontinuing it, Kawasaki reused the design of the motorcycle for the Platina in 2006, which had a 100 CC engine.
