= Yamaha SZ RR =

- Manufacturer: Yamaha Motor Company
- Production: 2015-2020
- Class: Standard
- Engine: 149 cc (9.1 cu in), 4-stroke, SOHC, air-cooled, single
- Bore / stroke: 57.3 mm × 57.9 mm (2.26 in × 2.28 in)
- Compression ratio: 9.5:1
- Ignition type: CDI Capacitor discharge ignition
- Transmission: Constant Mesh, 5 speed
- Frame type: Diamond
- Suspension: Front: telescopic fork Rear: swingarm
- Brakes: Front: Hydraulic single Disc; Rear: Mechanical leading trailing Drum
- Tires: Front: 2.75-17 41P 4PR Tubeless; Rear: 100/90-17 55P Tubeless
- Wheelbase: 1,320 mm (52 in)
- Dimensions: L: 1,990 mm (78 in); W: 750 mm (30 in); H: 1,100 mm (43 in)
- Seat height: 800 mm (31 in)
- Fuel capacity: 14L
- Oil capacity: 1.2L
- Related: Yamaha SZ16

The Yamaha SZ RR is a motorbike designed by the Yamaha Corporation.

== History ==
Yamaha introduced their bike SZ RR in 2013 after that they improved it technically and relaunched it as SZ RR version 2.0. Yamaha used its new Blue Core technology in the new SZ RR version 2.0, resulting in improved mileage and performance.

== Features ==
The new sz rr is available in 4 colors: Matte Green, Red Dash, Ivory white, and Green arrow. Matte Green is a limited edition color that costs extra.
