= Bajaj CT 100 =

Bajaj CT100
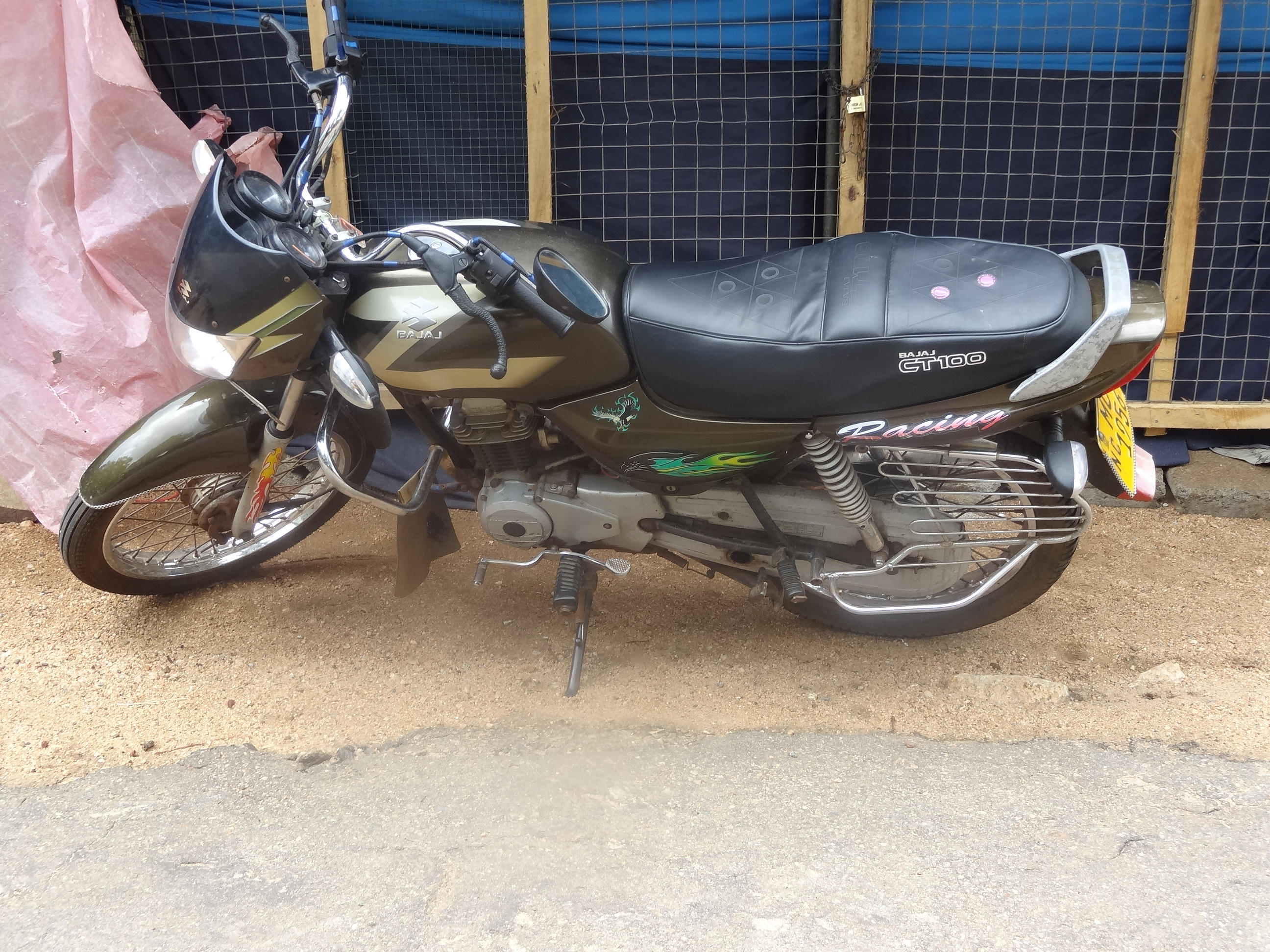
- Bajaj CT100
- Manufacturer: Bajaj
- Production: 2004–2006; 2015–2021
- Predecessor: Boxer
- Successor: Platina
- Class: Standard
- Engine: 99.2 cc (6.05 cu in) and 115 cc (7.0 cu in) 4-stroke with ride control selector (previous models)
- Ignition type: Capacitor discharge ignition (CDI)
- Transmission: 4-speed manual
- Suspension: Hydraulic, telescopic (front); Trailing arm with co-axial hydraulic shock absorb (rear)
- Brakes: Drum brakes (front and rear)
- Tires: Tube Type, Front 2.75/17, Rear 3.00/17
- Wheelbase: 1,235 mm (48.6 in)
- Dimensions: L: 1,965 mm (77.4 in); W: 770 mm (30 in); H: 1,072 mm (42.2 in)
- Seat height: 678 mm (26.7 in)

The Bajaj CT 100 is a 100 cc commuter motorcycle built by Bajaj Auto. It is the entry level commuter motorcycle offered by Bajaj Auto.

== Overview ==
The CT 100 replaced the Bajaj Boxer. The new CT-100 have the same four-stroke, 99.27 cc (6.058 cu in) engine as the Boxer. It came with a "Ride Control" switch which enables the rider to select between the economy and power mode; this feature was scrapped in the later models. The CT 100 used to give apx up to 104 km/L mileage, but current modifications due to emission standards have reduced its mileage capability to around 75 kmpl. The previous variant was discontinued in 2006 from the Indian market and the CT 100 relaunched in the Indian market in 2015 with all new graphics and alloy wheels. It spawned a variant of the much successful Bajaj Platina powered by a 115 cm^{3} engine called the CT 110 in 2019. It was the 9th best-selling motorcycle in India in 2019.

== History ==
=== First generation (2004–2006) ===
The first variant of the Bajaj CT100 was produced in 2004, featuring a 100cc engine. It competed with the then Hero Honda Splendor in the line of commuter bikes. This model was offered with a "Ride Control Switch", which improved fuel efficiency by manipulating the throttle response. This model came in six graphic colours. Production of this variant stopped in 2006. It was only available with spoke wheels and kickstart option; self-start was not provided then.

=== Second generation (2015–2019) ===
The CT100 was rebooted in 2015 featuring the same body styling, albeit featuring new graphics and alloy wheels and an upgraded engine complying with the BS3 emission standards. This variant was now available with self-start feature and comes in six colours. The Ride Control Switch offered in the previous generation was scrapped in this model.

=== Third generation (2020–present) ===
The BS6 compliant CT100 was launched in July 2020, amid the COVID-19 pandemic in India. It was also later launched in sri lanka and is still on sale. This model sports the same features as its previous generation albeit the graphics were updated to resemble its more powerful counterpart, the CT110, with notable difference being the absence of bellows covering the front suspension and fuel tank guards that are present on the CT110 as standard. It comes with the same graphic options as with the CT110.

== Bajaj CT110 ==
The success of the Bajaj CT 100 spawned a variant with a bigger 115cc engine called the CT 110 in 2019. Aesthetically, the bike resembles its predecessor, the Kawasaki Bajaj Caliber 115.

=== BS4 variant (2017–2019) ===
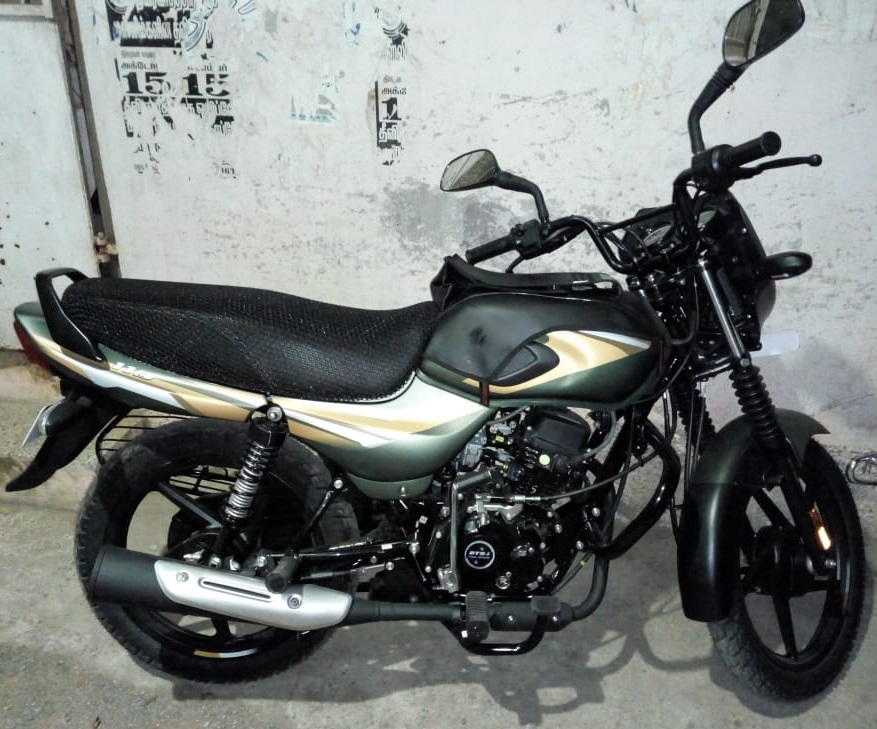
2019 Bajaj CT 110, BS4 model

It comes with three graphic colour options, namely gloss flame red with red decals, gloss ebony black with blue decals and matte olive green with yellow decals (picturised below). The CT 110 features a 10.5 L fuel tank, black alloy wheels and engine, analogue dashboard, 4-speed gearbox and produces an output of 8.6 PS @ 7000 rpm. It is capable of reaching a top speed of 95 km/h. The bike gives a fuel economy of 75 km/L. The CT 110's base model comes with electric start as standard issue and also features a combi-brake system (known as anti-skid braking system; it is featured in all models of the CT 110). Other than this, the CT 110 shares almost the same features as its 100cc counterpart. The motorcycle was offered only in the BS4 compliant variant and was succeeded by the BS6 variant in 2020.

=== BS6 variant (2020) ===
The BS6 compliant CT110 was launched in July 2020. Most of the features of the bike remain the same as its BS4 predecessor; the differences being as follows: featuring LED DRL lights above the main headlamp and a control switch to toggle either the DRL or main headlight. The graphics options remain the same, while a bigger catalytic converter was provided. The dashboard also comes with a check engine light to warn the rider of any anomalies in the bike in case of issues.

=== CT110X (2021) ===
The Bajaj CT110x was launched in April 2021, again complying with the BS6 emission norms. The bike gets a bunch of components that are not present in the standard CT110 model, while otherwise featuring the same chassis and power plant as the standard variant. Distinguishing features include round headlights, rear taillights resembling the CT 100B, a more rugged look and added luggage rack for off-road commuting.
