= Yamaha Gladiator =

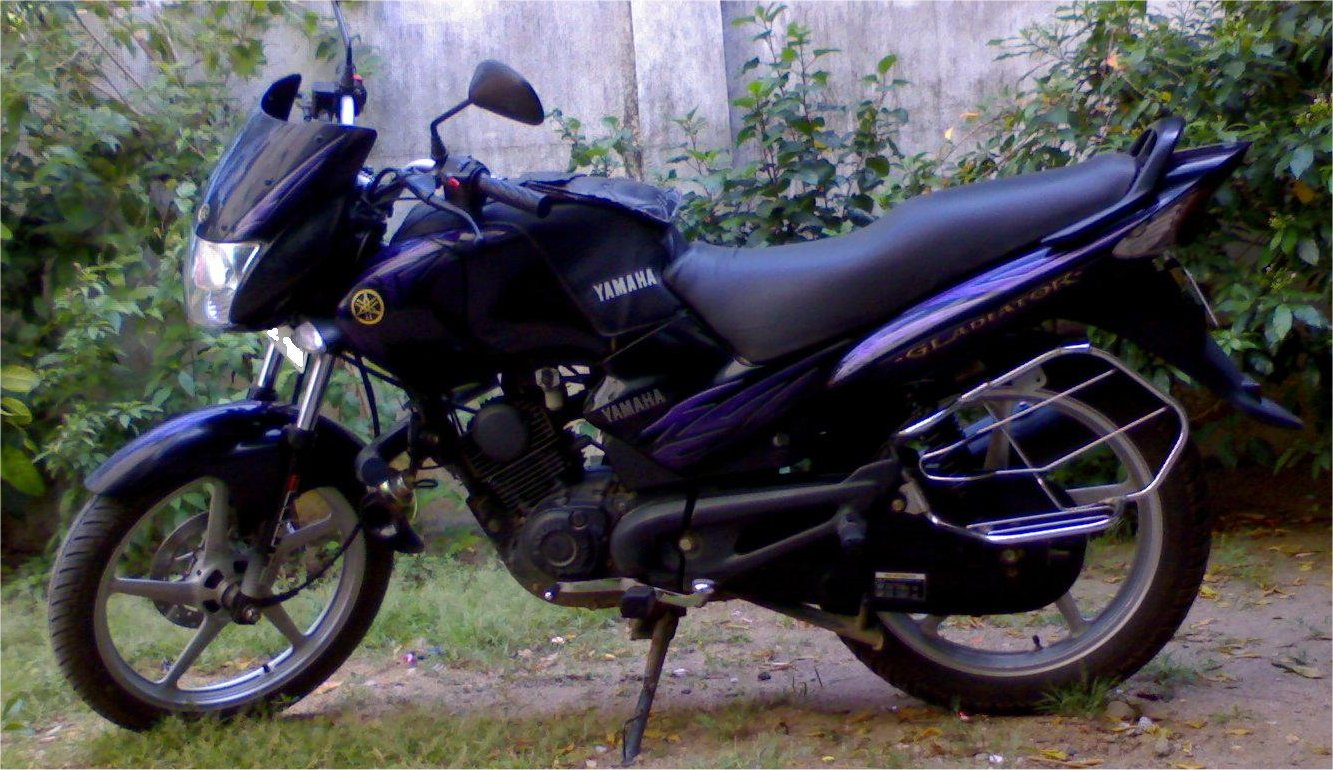
- Manufacturer: India Yamaha Motor
- Parent company: Yamaha Motor Company
- Production: 2006-2010
- Predecessor: Yamaha Fazer 125cc
- Successor: Yamaha SS 125
- Class: Standard
- Engine: 123.7 cc, 10.0:1 CR, air cooled, SOHC
- Transmission: 5-speed constant mesh
- Suspension: Front: Hydraulic Telescopic Fork; Rear:Rectangular swing arm with hydraulic shock absorber
- Brakes: Front: 240 mm disc Rear: 130 mm drum
- Tires: Front: 2.75*18" 4PR,42P; Rear: 3.00 X 18" 6PR, 52P
- Wheelbase: 1,300 mm (51 in)
- Dimensions: L: 2,065 mm (81.3 in); W: 730 mm (29 in); H: 1,100 mm (43 in)
- Seat height: 790 mm (31 in)
- Weight: 117 kg (258 lb) (dry)
- Fuel capacity: 13 litres (3.4 US gal)

The Yamaha Gladiator alias YBR 125 is a 125 cc motorcycle, developed by India Yamaha Motor. Production began in 2006.

The bike can be started in any gear and offers excellent corner handling. Yamaha claimed that the Gladiator bike will be able to give a mileage of 67 km/L (160 mpg_{‑US}) in actual city conditions.

== Marketing ==
At the launch of Yamaha Gladiator in India, Yamaha announced said that it planned to sell 4 lakh bikes in India and six lakhs later. Yamaha would also be setting up a new plant to manufacture two wheelers in India between 2008 and 2010.

== Features and specifications ==
	SPECIFICATIONS
Type	Single Cylinder Air Cooled, 4 Stroke Sohc
Valve Train	2 Valve
Displacement	123.7 cc
Bore & Stroke	54 X 54 MM
Comp. Ratio	10.0:1
Max. Power	8.0kW (10.7hp) @ 7,500 rpm
Max. Torque	10.4 NM (7.7 lb-ft) @ 6,500 rpm
Idle Speed	1,400 +- 100 rpm
Starting	Kick Start / Electric Start
Spark Plug	NGK CR7HSA - R
Gear Box	5 Speed Constant Mesh
Shift Pattern	1 Down, 4up
Primary Reduction	3.4
Final Reduction	3.214
Gear Ratio	1 St: 3.000, 2nd:1.777. 3rd: 1.316, 4th:1.045, 5th: 0.875
Clutch	Multiplate Wet Type
Battery	12V- 5AH(Self)
Head Light	12HS1(12v 35/35 W Halogen Bulb
Tail Lamp	12v 21/5w
Indicator	12v 10w
Indicator	12v 10w
Chassis Type	Diamond Tubular Type
Caster/ Trail	26 degree/ 90mm
Suspension Front	Telescopic Hydraulic Type
Suspension Rear	Rectangular Swing Arm With Hydraulic Shock Absorber
Brakes Front	Drum Type/ Disc Type
Brakes Rear	Drum Type
Tyre Front	2.75 X 18" 42 P
Tyre Rear	3.00 X 18" 6pr, 52 P
Kerb Weight	Kerb Wt - 127 kg (Deluxe)
Max Payload	130 kg
Wheel Base	1,300 mm
Length	2,065 mm
Width	730 mm
Overall Height	1,100 mm
Ground Clearance	160 mm
Tank Capacity	13 Lts.
