= Yamaha SS 125 =

Yamaha SS125
- Manufacturer: India Yamaha Motor
- Parent company: Yamaha Motor Company
- Production: 2010-2015
- Predecessor: Yamaha Gladiator
- Class: Standard
- Engine: 123.7 cc, air-cooled, SOHC
- Compression ratio: 10.0:1
- Top speed: 105 kmph
- Transmission: 5-speed constant mesh
- Suspension: Front: Hydraulic Telescopic Fork; Rear:Rectangular swing arm with hydraulic shock absorber
- Brakes: Front: 240 mm disc Rear: 130 mm drum
- Tires: Front: 2.75 x 18-inch 4PR, 42P; Rear: 3.00 x 18-inch 6PR, 52P
- Wheelbase: 1,295 mm (51.0 in)
- Dimensions: L: 1,995 mm (78.5 in); W: 730 mm (29 in); H: 1,110 mm (44 in)
- Seat height: 795 mm (31.3 in)
- Fuel capacity: 13.6 L (3.0 imp gal; 3.6 US gal)
- Related: YBR 125

The Yamaha SS 125 is a rechristened version of the Yamaha Gladiator. It is a 125 cc motorcycle, produced by India Yamaha Motor.

In the beginning of March 2008, Yamaha introduced two new models of the Gladiator, Type RS and Type SS. In August 2010, Yamaha discontinued the Gladiator and launched the SS 125. The SS 125 had minor changes in the chassis which shortened its dimensions and made it lighter by 3 kg. It also features a high-flow paper air-filter, racing engine cowl and a stylish exhaust muffler.

== Features and specifications ==
	SPECIFICATIONS
Type	Single-cylinder, air-cooled, four-stroke SOHC, two-valve
Displacement	123.7 cc
Bore & stroke	54 mm × 54 mm (2.1 in × 2.1 in)
Compression ratio	10.0:1
Power	11 PS @ 7,500 rpm
Torque	10.4 Nm @ 6,500 rpm
Idle Speed	1,400 +- 100 rpm
Starting	Kick Start / Electric Start
Spark Plug	NGK CR7HSA - R
Gearbox	Five-speed constant mesh
Shift pattern	1 down, 4 up
Primary reduction	3.4
Final reduction	3.214
Gear ratios	1st: 3.000, 2nd:1.777. 3rd: 1.316, 4th:1.045, 5th: 0.875
Clutch	Multiplate Wet Type
Battery	12V- 5AH(Self)
Head Light	12HS1(12v 35/35 W Halogen Bulb
Tail Lamp	12v 21/5w
Indicators	12v 10w
Chassis Type	Diamond Tubular Type
Caster/ Trail	18° / 90 mm
Suspension Front	Telescopic Hydraulic Type
Suspension Rear	Rectangular Swing Arm With Hydraulic Shock Absorber
Brakes Front	Disc Type
Brakes Rear	Drum Type
Tyre Front	2.75 x 18-inch 42 P
Tyre Rear	18.00 x 18-inch 6pr, 52 P
Kerb Weight	Kerb Wt - 125 kg
Max Payload	130 kg
Wheel Base	1,295 mm
Length	1,995 mm
Width	730 mm
Overall Height	1,110 mm
Ground Clearance	155 mm
Tank Capacity	13.6 L (3.0 imp gal; 3.6 US gal)
