= Bajaj Platina =

- Manufacturer: Bajaj Auto
- Production: 2006–present
- Predecessor: Bajaj CT 100
- Class: Commuter
- Engine: 99.3 cc (6.06 cu in) air-cooled, four-stroke, single
- Transmission: 4-speed, manual
- Suspension: Front: telescopic fork, 125 mm travel Rear: Hydraulic, 105 mm travel
- Brakes: Front: 130 mm (drum); Rear: 110 mm (drum)
- Tires: Front:2.75*17"; Rear:3.00*17"
- Wheelbase: 1,275 mm (50.2 in)
- Dimensions: L: 1,990 mm (78 in); W: 770 mm (30 in); H: 1,090 mm (43 in)
- Related: Bajaj Kawasaki Wind 125

Bajaj Platina is a 100 cc motorcycle manufactured by Bajaj Auto. The Platina was launched in April 2006 at an ex-showroom price of ₹35,000 and crossed sales of 500,000 units within eight months of its launch. A 125 DTS-Si variant with the same engine as the XCD was introduced in September 2007 with sales of more than 30,000 units per month but subsequently discontinued.

== Design and styling ==
The Platina's design is the same as Bajaj Kawasaki Wind 125, which was launched in late 2003. It is much more relaxed and upright than its rivals in the 100 cc segment. Bajaj Platina's front end might feel lighter when a pillion is on the bike. A new model of the same bike was recently launched named Bajaj Platina ES Comfortec.

== Comfort and handling ==
The bike has a plush ride without sacrificing handling. It has an upright riding posture inline with other commuter bikes.

== Performance and fuel economy ==
The engine of Platina is from another 100 cc bike from Bajaj, the Bajaj CT 100, but with a new Bajaj technology, ExhausTec. It has one of the best 100 cc engines which is very frugal and feels less stressed at high speeds than other bikes in the segment. The bike is capable of a top speed of around 91 km/h (57 mph) and does 0–60 km/h (0–37 mph) acceleration in 7.89 seconds. In city traffic, the bike returns 72 km/L (170 mpg_{‑US}; 200 mpg_{‑imp}), while on the highway it returns more than 80 km/L (190 mpg_{‑US}; 230 mpg_{‑imp}) if ridden at economy speeds.

== Awards ==
The 100 cc Platina won the 2007 NDTV Profit Bike India-100 cc bike of the year award.
