= Bajaj Kawasaki Caliber =

- Manufacturer: Bajaj Auto; Kawasaki
- Production: 1998–2006
- Assembly: Mumbai
- Predecessor: Bajaj Kawasaki 4S Champion
- Class: Executive commuter
- Engine: 111 cc (6.8 cu in) / 124.6 cc (7.60 cu in) single-cylinder
- Top speed: 152 km/h (94 mph) (with 50 kg (110 lb) rider)
- Power: 10.8 PS (7.9 kW)
- Torque: 12 N⋅m (8.9 lbf⋅ft)
- Transmission: 4-speed manual
- Suspension: Bubble
- Brakes: Drum
- Tires: 2.75×18 (front); 3.00×18 (rear)
- Wheelbase: 1,245 mm (49.0 in)
- Dimensions: L: 1,995 mm (78.5 in); H: 1,060 mm (42 in)
- Fuel capacity: 14 L (3.1 imp gal; 3.7 US gal)

The Bajaj Kawasaki Caliber was a motorcycle developed and sold by Kawasaki and Bajaj in India from 1998 to 2006. It was made by incorporating improvements to the Bajaj Kawasaki 4S Champion, including the addition of an oil filter. The Caliber was equipped with a 124.6-cubic-centimetre (7.60 cu in) engine and capable of a top speed of 152 km/h (94 mph) with a 50-kilogram (110 lb) rider.
