= Yamaha YBR125 =

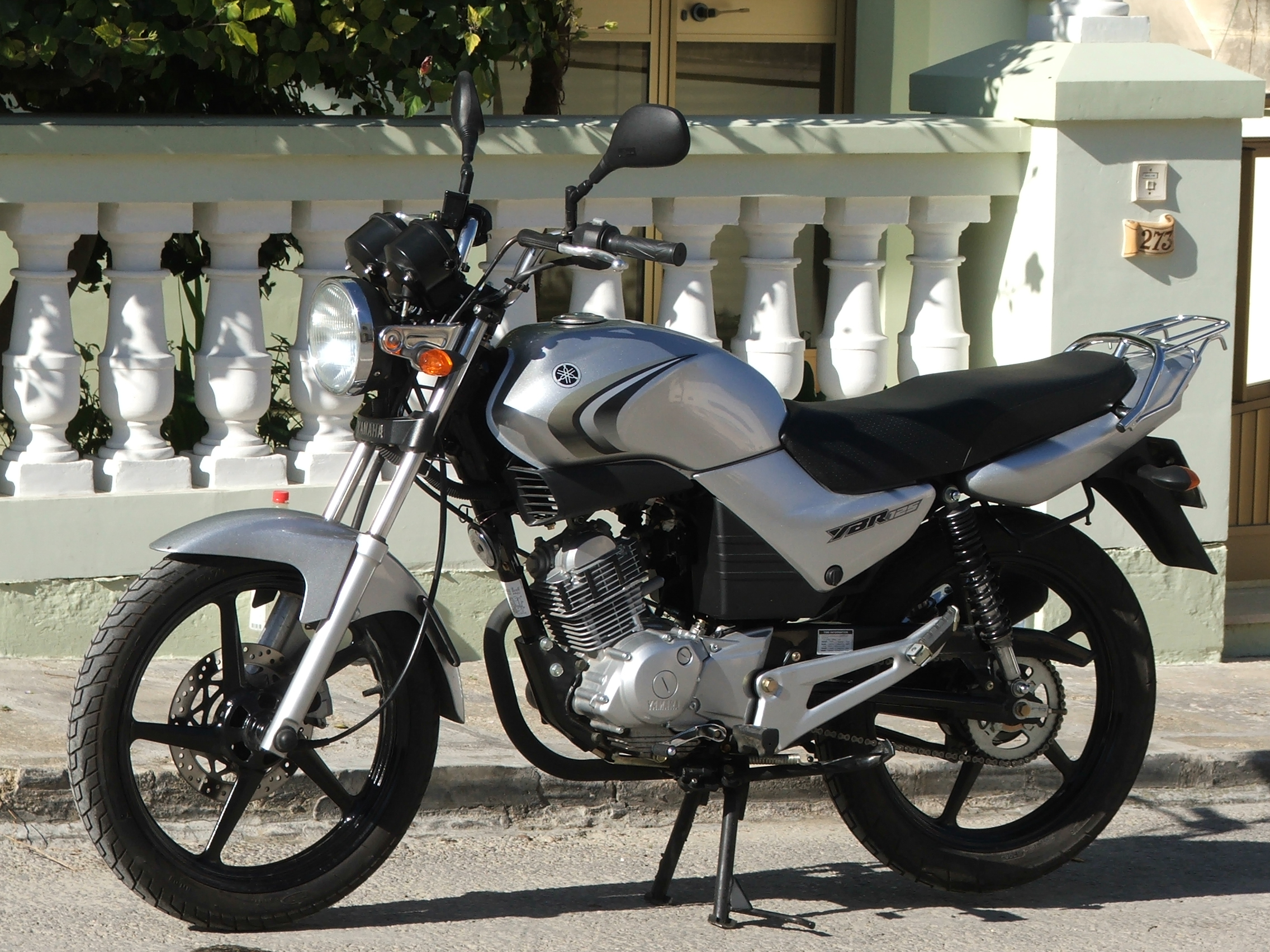
- Manufacturer: Yamaha Motor Company
- Parent company: Yamaha Corporation
- Production: 2005–present
- Predecessor: Yamaha SR125
- Successor: Yamaha YS125
- Class: Standard
- Engine: 124 cc (7.6 cu in), 4-stroke, OHC, air-cooled, single
- Bore / stroke: 54.0 mm × 54.0 mm (2.13 in × 2.13 in)
- Compression ratio: 10.0:1
- Ignition type: TCI
- Transmission: Wet clutch, 5-speed, chain
- Frame type: Steel diamond
- Suspension: Front:Telescopic fork, Coil spring, Oil damper Rear: Swingarm, Coil spring, Oil damper
- Brakes: Front: Disc; Rear: Drum
- Tyres: Front: 2.75-18 42P, Rear: 90/90-18 M/C 57P
- Rake, trail: 26°, 90 mm (3.5 in)
- Wheelbase: 1,290 mm (51 in)
- Dimensions: L: 1,985 mm (78.1 in); W: 745 mm (29.3 in); H: 1,080 mm (43 in)
- Seat height: 780 mm (31 in)
- Fuel capacity: 13 L (2.9 imp gal; 3.4 US gal)
- Related: Yamaha YBR250

The Yamaha YBR 125 is a light motorcycle made by Yamaha that succeeds its previous model for this segment, the Yamaha SR125. Introduced in 2005, it comes in naked, faired and 'custom' variants. It has a single-cylinder, air-cooled, four-stroke engine, displacing 124 cc (7.6 cu in). Model years up to 2007 use a carburetor system, with 2008 and on models using a fuel injection system.

Around 2010, Yamaha introduced the dual sport version of the Yamaha YBR 125. The new model was named Yamaha YBR 125 G, and it featured several off-road improvements. These include: engine and hand guards, higher front fender, anti-collision fender for the headlight and new block pattern tires.

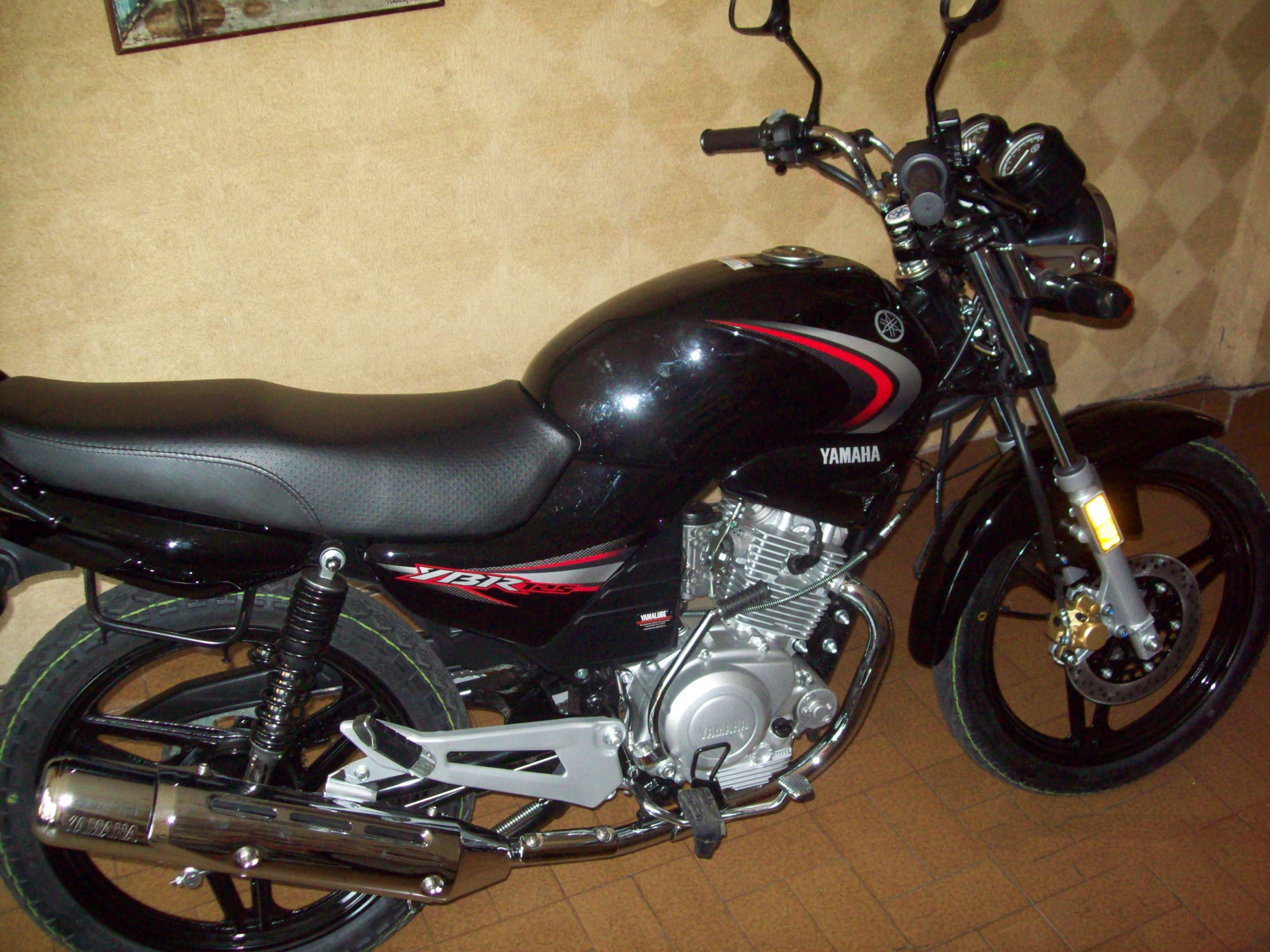
Yamaha YBR 125 ED (2011)

== Yamaha YS125 ==
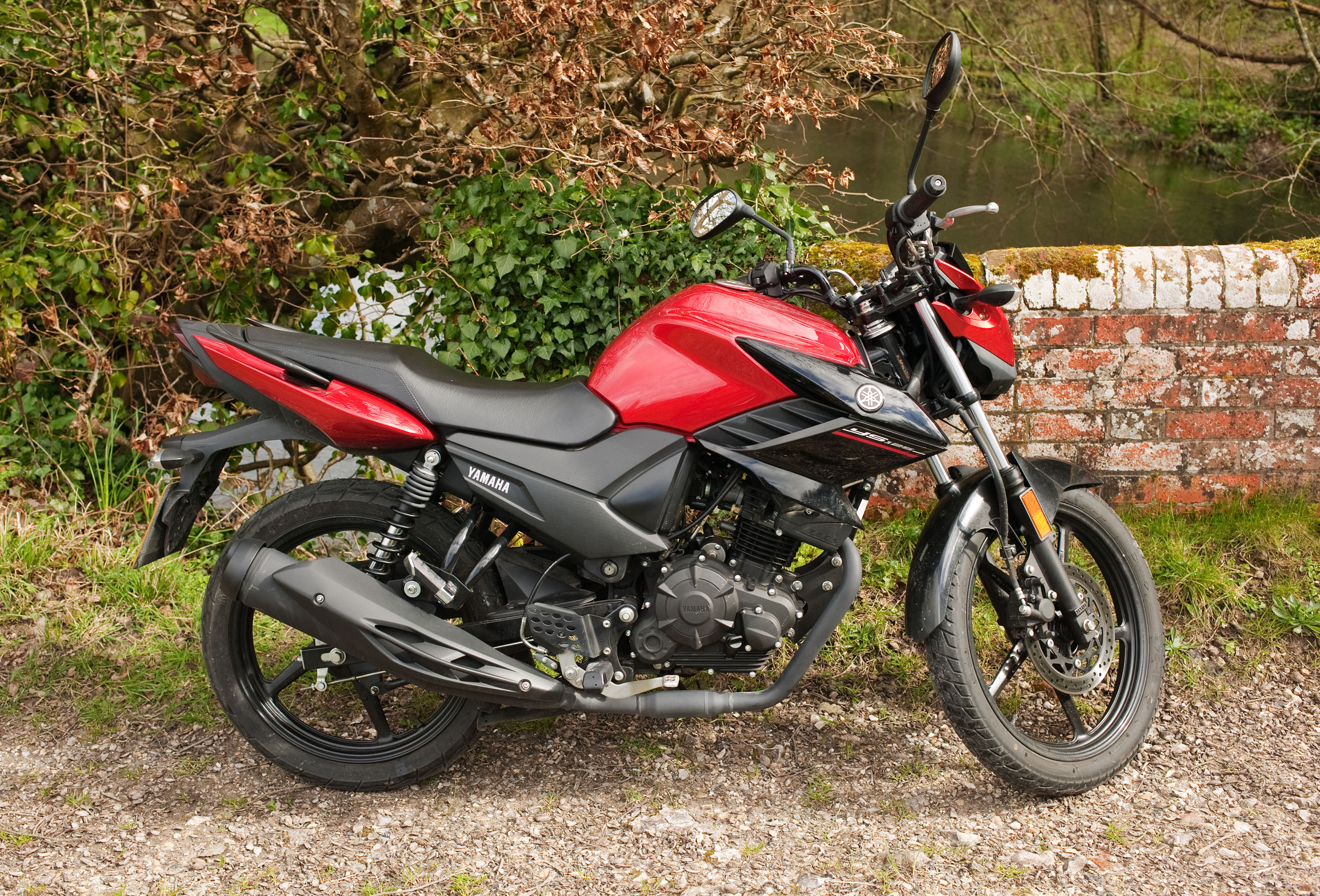
Yamaha YS125

The Yamaha YS125 was announced in February 2017. Primarily a facelift meant to comply with Euro4 standards, Yamaha needed to do a lot of changes to the YBR125 blueprint, justifying the new moniker. The Cylinder stroke was revised from 54mm to 57.9mm, power and fuel economy increased slightly as did fuel tank capacity. Seating position is higher than its predecessor by 15mm, and the clocks are now reminiscent of a Honda CBF125, the styling appears more aggressive and more modern while maintaining that YBR125 look. In Brazil, the YS retained the YBR name, added the Factor moniker.
