= Skoll Foundation =

US philanthropic foundation

- Formation: 1999
- Type: Private foundation and Supporting organization
- Headquarters: Washington, D.C., United States
- Chief Executive Officer: Marla Blow
- Key people: Jeffrey Skoll; Pat Mitchell; Marla Blow
- Disbursements: $106,000,000 (2025)
- Expenses: $32,000,000 (2024)
- Endowment: $2,202,000,000 (2025)
- Website: www.skoll.org

The Skoll Foundation is an American private foundation based in Washington D.C. as of 2026, having relocated from Palo Alto, California. The foundation makes grants and investments intended to reduce global poverty. It was founded by Jeffrey Skoll in 1999.

The Skoll Foundation's total assets (including its affiliated funds) exceed $2 billion as of 2025. The combined entities made grant disbursements totaling about $106 million in 2025, based on unaudited numbers reported by the foundation. According to Skoll's most recent audited financial statements (2024), the non-grant expenses for the foundation totaled around $32 million in 2025.

== History ==
Skoll set up the foundation in 1999 to fund social entrepreneurship through awards, grants and educational programs at Oxford and Harvard Universities. Skoll, the first president of eBay, created the Skoll Foundation after setting up the eBay Foundation.

In 2001, Skoll hired Sally Osberg, formerly the founding executive director of the Children's Discovery Museum of San Jose. Osberg was the foundation's first employee, president and CEO. Osberg claims that she led the organization through its startup, implementation and renewal phases. Osberg and her colleagues set up platforms to connect civil society members with private and public sector leaders. These platforms included partnerships with Sundance Festival and Oxford's Saïd Business School.

In 2003, Skoll established the private Skoll Foundation. The two entities, which have distinct governing bodies but share staff and offices, together operate the foundation's grantmaking and other programs.

In 2017, Osberg announced plans to step down from the role of CEO. In 2018, Richard Fahey assumed the role of interim president after 14 years of executive leadership at the foundation. In February 2019, Donald Gips was appointed as the foundation's CEO. Formerly, Gips served as the U.S. Ambassador to the Republic of South Africa. In March 2021, the foundation hired Marla Blow as its president and chief operating officer. She had formerly served as the senior vice president for social impact in North America for the Mastercard Center for Inclusive Growth. She was promoted to CEO as of June 1, 2025.

The foundation, which moved to its Palo Alto headquarters in 2004, also collaborated closely with the Skoll Global Threats Fund, established in 2009, to address climate change, pandemics, water security, nuclear proliferation, and conflict in the Middle East. Some of the fund's initiatives supported by the foundation have included an app, developed in partnership with the Brazilian Ministry of Health, that allowed monitoring of health conditions and potential infection by the Zika virus during the 2016 Olympics; supporting surveillance technologies that identify epidemics at their earliest outbreak; and development of an online tool that will help policymakers identify global water risk and food security hot spots.

The foundation began funding research into pandemic preparedness and prevention in 2009. Simultaneously, the organization funded research into climate change water scarcity, nuclear weapons and conflict in the Middle East; it called this its Global Threats Fund. Previously, the foundation partnered with Google's philanthropic arm, Google.org to fund Nathan Wolfe's 2008 research into cross-species transmission amongst Cameroonian bushmeat hunters. In 2018 the fund created Ending Pandemics, a non-profit spun out from its research into pandemic detection and rapid response.

Skoll increased the foundation's 2020 grant to $200 million to respond to the pandemic's economic, health and social impact. The African Field Epidemiology Network, a group that works with Africa Centres for Disease Control and Prevention were the foundation's first COVID-related grantees. The foundation also gave sixty-four past and current Skoll grantees $50,000 in emergency funding during this period.

== Skoll Centre for Social Entrepreneurship at the University of Oxford ==
In 2003, the foundation donated $7.5M to the Saïd Business School at Oxford University to establish the Skoll Centre for Social Entrepreneurship. The center studies and promotes socially purposed businesses and hosts a one-year MBA programme in social entrepreneurship. The grant also funded an endowed lectureship, program director, visiting fellows, five MBA student fellowships, visiting fellows, and the annual Skoll World Forum on Social Entrepreneurship. The Skoll Centre's activities concentrate on educating social change leaders, practical research and convening leaders in the social change field.

== Skoll World Forum ==
The annual Skoll World Forum assembles social entrepreneurship leaders at the Said Business School to discuss solutions to social challenges. The foundation held its first forum in 2004. Attendance was roughly 1,200 as of the 2019 Forum, and the delegates represented around 80 countries. The event facilitates impact investing.

In 2026, the event attracted thousands of philanthropists and social entrepreneurs, and artificial intelligence was a prominent topic of discussion. Comedian Trevor Noah discussed AI with Noubar Afeyan, co-founder and chairman of Moderna.

=== Notable speakers ===
- Kofi Annan, 2013
- Malala Yousafzai, 2014
- Desmond Tutu, 2015
- Al Gore, 2016
- Jimmy Carter, 2018

== The Skoll Awards for Social Entrepreneurship ==
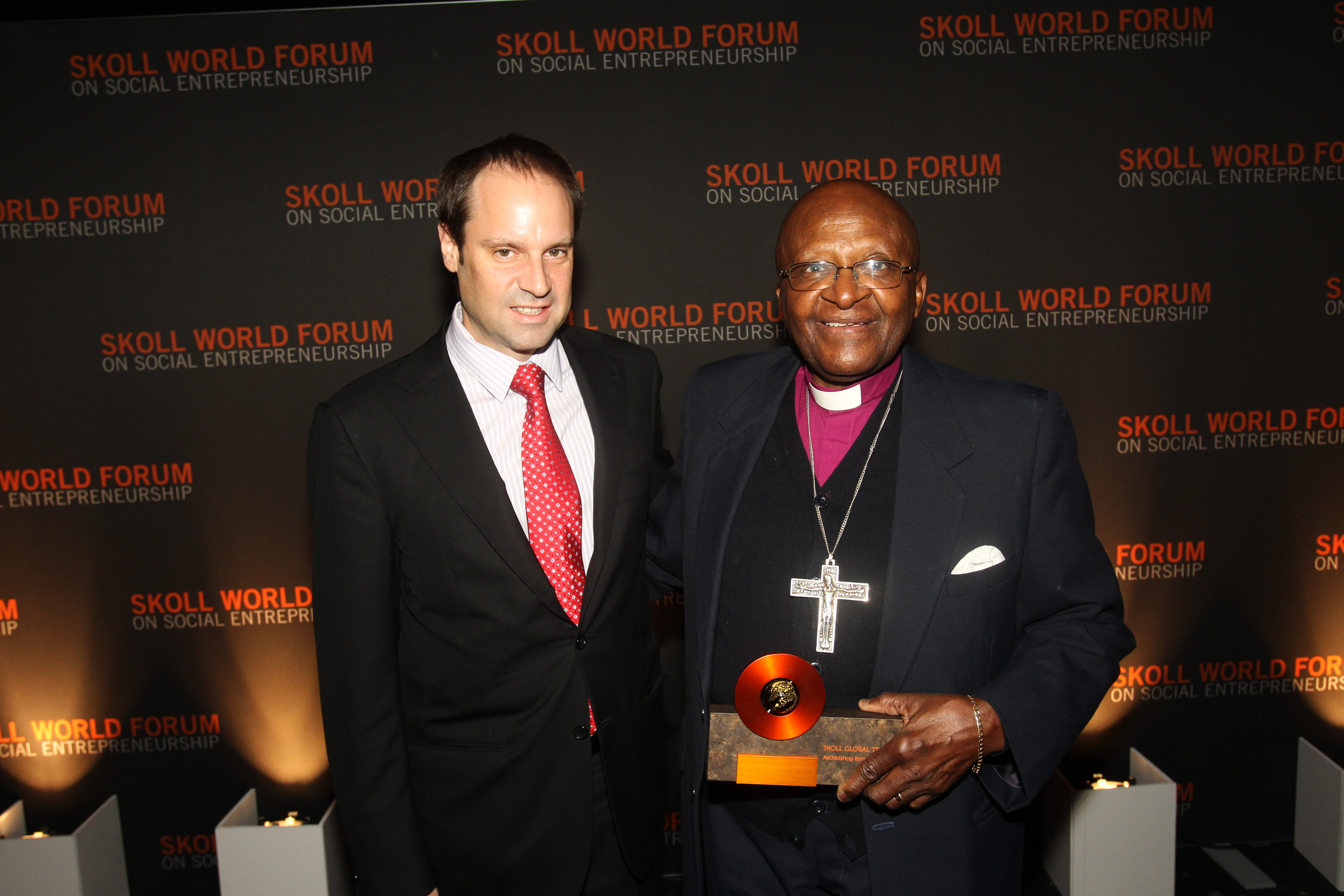
Jeffrey Skoll (left) and Desmond Tutu (right) at the Skoll Awards for Social Entrepreneurship

Each year, the Skoll Foundation presents the Skoll Awards for Social Entrepreneurship:

Skoll Awards for Social Entrepreneurship awardees
Year	Organization	Awardee(s)
2005	Barefoot College	Bunker Roy
2005	CAMFED	Ann Cotton
2005	Citizen Schools	Eric Schwarz
2005	Fair Trade USA	Paul Rice
2005	Fundación Paraguaya	Martin Burt
2005	GoodWeave International	Nina Smith
2005	Institute for One World Health	Victoria Hale
2005	International Development Enterprises	Amitabha Sadangi
2005	KickStart International	Nick Moon; Martin Fisher
2005	Recode (formerly the Center for Digital Inclusion)	Rodrigo Baggio
2005	Root Capital	Willy Foote
2005	Sonidos de la Tierra	Luis Szaran
2005	WITNESS	Gillian Caldwell
2006	Afghan Institute of Learning	Sakena Yacoobi
2006	Aflatoun	Jeroo Billimoria
2006	Benetech	Jim Fruchterman
2006	Ceres	Mindy Lubber
2006	Ciudad Saludable	Albina Ruiz
2006	Community and Individual Development Association City Campus	Taddy Blecher
2006	Health Care Without Harm	Gary Cohen
2006	Institute for Development Studies and Practices	Quratulain Bakhteari
2006	International Bridges to Justice	Karen I. Tse
2006	PeerForward formally, College Summit	J.B. Schramm
2006	Riders for Health	Barry Coleman (correspondent); Andrea Coleman
2006	Room to Read	John Wood
2006	Roots of Peace	Heidi Kuhn
2006	Saude Crianca	Vera Cordeiro
2006	Search for Common Ground	Susan Collin Marks; John Marks
2006	VillageReach	Blaise Judja-Sato
2007	Friends International	Sebastien Marot
2007	Fundacion Escuela Nueva	Vicky Colbert
2007	Global Footprint Network	Susan Burns; Mathis Wackernagel
2007	Gram Vikas	Joe Madiath
2007	Kashf Foundation	Roshaneh Zafar
2007	Manchester Bidwell Corporation	William Strickland
2007	Marine Stewardship Council	Rupert Howes
2007	Verité	Daniel Viederman
2007	WE, formerly Free The Children	Craig Kielburger; Marc Kielburger
2007	YouthBuild USA	Dorothy Stoneman
2008	Amazon Conservation Team	Mark Plotkin; Liliana Madrigal
2008	American Council on Renewable Energy	Michael Eckhart
2008	Arzu	Connie Duckworth
2008	Digital Divide Data	Jeremy Hockenstein; Mai Siriphongphanh
2008	Kiva	Premal Shah; Matt Flannery
2008	mothers2mothers	Gene Falk; Mitchell Besser
2008	OneSky	Jenny Bowen
2008	OneVoice Movement	Daniel Lubetzky
2008	Partners In Health	Paul Farmer
2008	Population and Community Development Association	Mechai Viravaidya
2008	Voice of the Free, formerly Visayan Forum Foundation	Maria Cecilia Flores-Oebanda
2009	APOPO	Bart Weetjens
2009	Bioregional Development Group	Pooran Desai; Sue Riddlestone
2009	EcoPeace Middle East	Gidon Bromberg; Munqeth Mehyar; Nader Al Khateeb
2009	Gaia Amazonas	Martin von Hildebrand
2009	INJAZ Al-Arab	Soraya Salti
2009	International Center for Transitional Justice	Juan E. Méndez; Paul van Zyl
2009	Teach for All	Wendy Kopp
2009	Vision Spring	Jordan Kassalow
2009	Water.org	Gary White
2010	Building Markets	Scott Gilmore
2010	Encore.org	Marc Freedman
2010	Forest Trends	Michael Jenkins
2010	Imazon	Carlos Souza Jr; Beto Verissimo
2010	One Acre Fund	Andrew Youn
2010	Telapak	Ambrosuis Ruwindruarto; Silverius Oscar Unggul
2010	Tostan	Molly Melching
2011	Health Leads	Rebecca Onie
2011	New Teacher Center	Ellen Moir
2011	Pratham	Madhav Chavan
2011	Water for People	Ned Breslin
2012	Gawad Kalinga	Jose Luis Oquinena; Tony Meloto
2012	Landesa	Tim Hanstad
2012	Proximity Designs	Debbie Aung Din Taylor; Jim Taylor (social entrepreneur)
2012	Nidan	Arbind Singh
2013	BasicNeeds	Chris Underhill
2013	The Citizens Foundation	Mushtaq Chhapra
2013	Crisis Action	Gemma Mortensen
2013	Independent Diplomat	Carne Ross
2013	Khan Academy	Sal Khan
2013	World Health Partners	Gopi Gopalakrishnan
2014	B Lab	Jay Coen Gilbert; Bart Houlahan
2014	Fundación Capital	Yves Moury
2014	Girls Not Brides	Mabel van Oranje
2014	Global Witness	Simon Taylor; Charmian Gooch; Patrick Alley
2014	Medic Mobile	Josh Nesbit
2014	Slum Dwellers International	Jockin Arputham
2014	Water and Sanitation for the Urban Poor (WSUP)	Sam Parker
2015	Blue Ventures	lasdair Harris
2015	Educate Girls Foundation	Safeena Husain
2015	Foundation for Ecological Security	Jagdeesh Rao Puppala
2015	Institute of Public and Environmental Affairs	Ma Jun (environmentalist)
2016	Breakthrough	Mallika Dutt; Sonali Khan
2016	Equal Justice Initiative	Bryan Stevenson
2016	Living Goods	Chuck Slaughter
2016	Namati	Vivek Maru
2016	Videre	Oren Yakobovich
2017	Babban Gona	Kola Masha
2017	Build Change	Elizabeth Hausler
2017	Last Mile Health	Raj Panjabi
2017	Polaris Project	Bradley Myles
2018	Angaza	Lesley Silverthorn Marincola
2018	Callisto (project)	Jess Ladd
2018	Code for America	Jennifer Pahlka
2018	Global Health Corps	Barbara Bush
2018	myAgro	Anushka Ratnayake
2018	SELCO India	Harish Hande
2019	Crisis Text Line	Nancy Lublin
2019	Harambee Youth Employment Accelerator	Nicola Galombik; Maryana Iskander
2019	mPedigree	Bright Simons; Selorm Branttie
2019	mPharma	Gregory Rockson
2019	Thorn (organization)	Julie Cordua
2020	ARMMAN	Aparna Hegde
2020	Centre for Tech and Civil Life	Tiana Epps-Johnson; Whitney May; Donny Bridges
2020	Glasswing International	Celina de Sola; Ken Baker
2020	Organized Crime and Corruption Reporting Project	Drew Sullivan (journalist); Paul Radu
2020	International Council on Clean Transportation	Drew Kodjak
2022	Common Future	Rodney Foxworth
2022	Financing Alliance for Health	Angela Gichaga
2022	MapBiomas	Tasso Azevedo
2022	NDN Collective	Nick Tilsen
2022	Noora Health	Edith Elliott; Shahed Alam
2022	NOSSAS	Alessandra Orofino
2023	AMAN	Mina Setra; Rukkha Sombolinggi
2023	Reach Digital Health	Debbie Rogers
2023	Protect Democracy	Ian Bassin
2023	Conexsus	Carina Pimenta
2023	PolicyLink	Michael McAfee
2024	Food for Education	Wawira Njiru
2024	IllumiNative	Crystal Echo Hawk; Michael Johnson
2024	Meedan	Ed Bice
2024	SaveLIFE Foundation	Piyush Tewari
2025	Apis & Heritage Capital Partners (A&H)	Todd Leverette; Philip Reeves
2025	Community Health Impact Coalition	Madeleine Ballard; Margaret Odera
2025	EarthEnable	Gayatri Datar
2025	Healthy Learners	Lonnie Hackett; Ignicious Bulongo
2025	Pacto pela Democracia	Flávia Pellegrino
2026	Childlife Foundation	Ahson Rabbani
2026	Indus Action	Tarun Cherukuri
2026	SmartStart	Grace Matlhape

== See also ==
- Social entrepreneurship
- Maryana Iskander
- Saïd Business School
