= CIDA =

CIDA (or Cida) may stand for:

== Places and organizations ==
- Center for Innovative Design & Analysis, a unit of the Colorado School of Public Health
- Canadian International Development Agency, a defunct department of the Government of Canada
- Community & Individual Development Association
- CIDA City Campus
- Centro de Investigaciones de Astronomia, Venezuelan institute of astronomical investigation
- Council for Interior Design Accreditation, a higher education accreditation organization
- Certificate in Digital Applications, an ICT qualification
- Critical Infrastructure Defence Act

== People ==
- Cida (footballer) (born 1985), Aparecida Santana de Lira, Brazilian footballer
