= Radio 4 Appeal =

British radio programme

- Genre: Informational
- Running time: 3:00 (9:26 pm – 9:29 pm)(also airs at 07:55; each Sunday)
- Country of origin: United Kingdom
- Language: English
- Home station: BBC Radio 4
- TV adaptations: BBC Lifeline Appeal
- Hosted by: Varies
- Recording studio: BBC Radio; London, England
- Original release: 1 January 1908
- Website: bbc.co.uk/programmes/b006qnc7

The Radio 4 Appeal is a British radio programme on BBC Radio 4. Each week a single speaker, usually a celebrity, appeals for support for a different charity (for example Paul Heiney appealed on behalf of Send a Cow in 2008, while Ross Noble appealed on behalf of Riders for Health in 2010). Listeners are invited to respond by sending cheques using a Freepost address, or can make payments online or by telephone. Listeners can also set up a standing order payment to support all 52 charities each year.

The programme is transmitted in a three-minute block at 07:55 and 21:26 on Sunday, and at 15:27 on the following Thursday. It is governed by the BBC's Charity Appeal Policy.

Each year since 1927, the BBC has broadcast a special Christmas Appeal in association with St Martin-in-the-Fields church in Trafalgar Square, London. This raises funds which are divided equally between The Connection at St Martin's, which supports vulnerable and homeless people in central London, and the Vicar's Relief Fund, which makes grants, averaging £200, to people anywhere in the UK who are at risk of homelessness or with experience of being homeless. The 2012 Appeal raised a record £1.9 million.

In 2007-2008 the appeals raised £1,433,154.02 for 52 charities. Just over half of this, £725,000, was for the annual Christmas appeal, broadcast on 2 Dec 2007. Amounts raised for other charities in that year ranged from £1,366.00 (Jenni Murray appealing for BEAT (Eating Disorders Association) on 24 Feb 2008) to £53,988.00 (Krishnan Guru-Murthy appealing for Homeless International on 3 March 2007, one week later).

An earlier programme based on the same principle was The Week's Good Cause, which ran from 1926 (from 1939 in the BBC Home Service) until controller James Boyle's major reforms to Radio 4 in 1998, and was the longest running BBC radio series.
