= Omar Maani =

Jordanian politician

Senator, Trustee of the Crown Prince Foundation, Former Mayor of Amman
- In office April 2006 – March 2011
- Preceded by: Nidal Al Hadid
- Succeeded by: Akil Biltaji

Personal details
- Born: Amman

Omar Maani is a businessman and reform driven politician serving in the house of senate. Mr. Maani also served as Mayor of Amman, the capital of Jordan, for five years from 2006. Prior to his tenure, he was the founder and Chairman of Maani Group, a private sector manufacturing group which he led for the past 30 years. On 27 September 2016 he was appointed as a member of the Jordanian Senate.

In 4/10/2016, Omar Maani was appointed by Royal Decree as a member on the board of trustees for the Crown Prince Foundation. The Crown Prince Foundation supports voluntary, social and charitable efforts in the Kingdom. It carries out its mission through supporting local communities and developing the talents of young people, improving their living conditions and enhancing their role in development projects. The foundation also seeks to boost comprehensive development in the various governorates.

As mayor, he was mandated with the creation of a strategic plan to accommodate the rapid growth and development of Amman, which had grown from a small town of a few thousand people in the early 20th century to a capital city inhabited by over 2.5 million people in 2005.

The 'Amman Plan', as the master-plan that Maani has overseen has been officially known, dealt with the future metropolitan growth of Amman, the intensification of the urban fabric inside the existing urban envelope, the protection of urban heritage and the formulation of high-rise building regulations that are sensitive to Amman's hilly nature and topography.

Maani's presence as mayor of Amman has also been marked in an increased emphasis on the city's urban image. Regulations to reduce visual clutter, resulting from the excessive presence of advertising billboards, were introduced, initially to strong objections from the outdoor advertising industry. (This was not the first time an attempt to solve clutter and implement regulations. In the 90s Queen Noor lead such an effort). Street signage and building numbering were also introduced on a wide scale.

== Education ==
B.Sc. Civil Engineering, The University of Birmingham, UK. M.Sc. Construction Management, University of Southern California, USA.

== Achievements as Mayor ==
Omar Maani served 5 years as Mayor of Amman, Jordan. His office is credited for several major projects in the city including

=== City planning and infrastructure ===
- Amman Master Plan: An initiative launched under a royal decree in 2006. It is a series of documents that outline planning policies and a future vision for the city and direct development for the coming 20 years.
- Amman Institute for Urban Development

A not-for-profit institution that focuses on urban governance, community planning and sustainable community development. It has a staff of over fifty (50) professionals.

- Naming streets and numbering buildings
- Halting land encroachment
- Traffic control centers and cameras
- Changing road materials
- Prince Hashem bin Abdullah intersection tying Marj Al-Hamam to Abdoun
- Amman Bus Rapid Transit project

=== Community building ===
- Rebranding Amman: The program empowered community members to create their own image for the city and its people and attempted to establish a sense of identity and loyalty to the city.
- Amman Marathon
- Amman Summer Festival
- Amman Stand-up Comedy Festival
- Al-Ashrafiyyeh Community Center and rehabilitation of Abu Darwish mosque and surrounding public space
- Community multipurpose center on Istiqlal Street
- Constructed 8 sports centers, 28 libraries, and 26 IT centers
- Supporting cultural, artistic, athletic initiatives including 192 organizations, 84 sports clubs, 10 unions, 23 sports federations, and 6 associations

=== Preserving heritage ===
- Rehabilitation of downtown (Hashemi Square and Feisal Square)
- Rehabilitation of the Citadel – this refers to the archaeological site of the Citadel. The Citadel neighborhood of circa 6000 people was neglected and the project angered and marginalized the local community. This remains a chronic crisis for the community.
- Rehabilitation of Rainbow Street – this project was initiated by the previous mayor, Nidal Hadid. There is a common misguided attribution to Maani because the project alleged completion was during Maani's time in office. The success of this area is yet to be determined as the original vision was never completely implemented, creating a traffic crisis in the area.
- Execution of Wakalat Street pedestrian area

=== Parks and open spaces ===
- King Abdullah II Parks
- Abdoun Park
- Japanese Garden
- Marj Al-Hamam Park
- Al-Jiza Park
- Hashimiyyeh Park in Sahab
- Prince Hashem bin Abdullah Park
- Rehabilitation of Asma bint Abu Baker Park
- Al-Rahmaniyyeh Park
- Rehabilitation of Zahran Park

Amongst many smaller "pocket parks" and planting hundreds of rooftop gardens in downtown

== Awards ==
In 2008, Omar Maani accepted, on the behalf of the city of Amman, the World Leadership Awards in Town Planning Category

He is included among the finalists for the 2010 World Mayor prize.

The Amman Master Plan received the Award of Planning Excellence from the Canadian Institute of Planners in 2010.

== Personal life ==
Omar Maani is married to Meisa Batayneh Maani, a Jordanian architect. Together they have three children.

His mother, Subhieyeh Maani is a former member of the Jordanian Senate, where she served for two terms

== Professional and civic associations ==
- Vice Chairman, Vocational Training & Employment, National Agenda.
- Board member, Amman Chamber of Industry.
- Board member, Social Security Investment Fund.
- Board Member, Jordan Exports Development Co.
- Board member, Institute of Standards & Metrology.
- Founding member, Young Entrepreneurs Association.
- Board member, INJAZ.
- Regular member, Jordan Engineers Union.
- Regular member, Jordan Trade Association.
- Regular member, Jordan Businessmen Association.
- Board member, Jordan Basketball Federation.
