= Deborah Taylor =

Deborah Taylor may refer to:

- Deborah D. Taylor, librarian and coordinator of school and student services at Enoch Pratt Free Library in Baltimore, Maryland
- Deborah Taylor (judge), retired British judge
- Deborah Taylor Tate, Commissioner of the Federal Communications Commission (2006–2009)

== See also ==
- Debbie Taylor (born 1947), American soul and jazz singer
- Debbie Aung Din Taylor, social entrepreneur
- Debbi Taylor, American sports reporter
