= Digital Divide Data =

Social enterprise

DDD is a social enterprise that delivers digital content, data and research services to clients worldwide. Customers receive high-quality competitively priced digital content services. At the same time, DDD's innovative social model enables talented youth from low-income families to access professional opportunities and earn lasting higher income. This model, established by DDD in 2001, is now called "impact sourcing” and has been implemented by dozens of firms around the world. Featured in Thomas L. Friedman's The World Is Flat as an example of socially responsible outsourcing, DDD's clients include Reader's Digest, Harvard Business School, New York Daily News, Ancestry.com, and Stanford University.

== History ==
In February 2001, Jeremy Hockenstein (co-founder of DDD) travelled to Angkor Wat and was struck by the mix of poverty and progress in Cambodia. Though there were computer schools offering training to young people, there were still no jobs for the students once they graduated. Recognizing the opportunity to make a difference, Jeremy assembled a group of friends, who all saw an opportunity for growth: applying India's outsourcing model to Southeast Asia could provide jobs and contribute to the region's development. The group returned to Cambodia during the summer and founded Digital Divide Data, (now known as DDD) with a plan to start a data entry operation in Phnom Penh.

DDD opened for business in July 2001. The enterprise began as a single small office in Phnom Penh, digitizing the Harvard Crimson. In 2003, Digital Divide Data opened an office in Vientiane, Laos, which in early 2004 was followed by a third office in Battambang, Cambodia. The Battambang operation was merged into the Phnom Penh office in 2012. A fourth operations center was opened in Nairobi, Kenya in April 2011.

The Kenya office is located at Paramount Plaza, 7th Floor, off Globe Cinema Roundabout, Nairobi, Kenya.

DDD currently operates three offices with over 1000 staff. It is currently the largest technology employer in Cambodia and Laos.

In 2026, Digital Divide Data marked 25 years of operations in Cambodia, commemorating a quarter century since its founding in Phnom Penh in 2001. The milestone highlighted the organization's long-term commitment to creating education and employment opportunities for underserved communities through its work-study model.

== Social Model ==
DDD's work/study program allows young women and men from low-income families to gain work experience while pursuing higher education, with the stated aim of helping them secure professional employment and higher incomes to break the cycle of poverty. According to the organization, the projected increase in lifetime earnings for youth in the program since 2001 exceeds $250 million.

DDD recruits disadvantaged high school graduates, ages 17–24, including young women and men, and youth with disabilities. Recruited youth participate in a work/study program which offers training, employment, and the opportunity to complete higher education. A rigorous recruitment process ensures that the youth who join DDD have the skills, commitment and maturity to succeed in the work/study program.

Participants typically work 36 hours a week providing digital content services to clients. After a one-year probation period, they are eligible for a scholarship package to support their university education. Once enrolled in university, they continue to work, enabling them to study and complete their degrees in 4–5 years.

Since 2001, DDD has trained over 2000 youth, employed more than 1500, and graduated over 500 to better paying jobs. Graduates of DDD earn more than four times the average annual income in Cambodia and Laos.

== Board of directors ==
Jeremy Hockenstein*
Sameer Raina, CEO
Jaeson Rosenfeld*
Clément Nouvel
Phloeun Prim
Stefan Kappeler
Christina Fernandes-D'Souza
Anne Njuki
Robert Shultz

Asterisk denotes co-founder of DDD

== Services ==
- AI data services include data annotation, data collection, model evaluation, and support for low-resource languages.
- Physical AI services include training data creation and annotation for AI-powered systems.
- Autonomous systems services include data preparation and validation for machine learning applications.
- Robotics services include data annotation and training datasets for robotics and automation solutions.
- Research services include: market research, web research, and digital marketing.
- Data entry and conversion services include: academic data entry, database content and support, survey digitization, and direct marketing support.
- Digital publishing services include: XML enhancement/conversion, eBook conversion, magazine conversion, journal digitization, and newspaper conversion.
- Digital libraries services include: digitization of archives, newspaper digitization, EAD conversion, and OCR assessment.

== Awards and recognition ==
- ICT Association of Kenya 2013 Value Award for Excellence in Digital Content
- The Global Journal's List of World's Top 100 NGOs, 2012 and 2013
- Vision 2030 Award for Best Business Process Outsourcing Firm in Kenya
- eAsia Award for Best Employment Creation Initiative in Asia, 2011
- Skoll Foundation Award for Social Enterprise in 2008
- World Bank Development Marketplace Award
- IFC Grassroots Business Initiative
- Global Knowledge Partnership
- 2008 Clinton Global Initiative panelist and participant
- Siemens Non-Profit Global Impact Award for Supplier Excellence, June 2009
- Member of The New York 100 for business, July 2009
