= Yamaha AG100 =

AG100
- Manufacturer: Yamaha
- Class: Utility farm bike
- Engine: 97 cc (5.9 cu in), air-cooled, 2-stroke, single
- Bore / stroke: 52.0 mm × 45.6 mm (2.05 in × 1.80 in)
- Compression ratio: 6.6:1
- Top speed: 95 km/h
- Power: 6.3 kw
- Transmission: 5-speed manual, chain final drive
- Frame type: Steel semi-double cradle
- Brakes: Drum
- Tires: 19" front, 18" rear
- Wheelbase: 1,315 mm (51.8 in)
- Seat height: 800 mm (31 in)
- Weight: 99 kg (218 lb) (dry)
- Fuel capacity: 11 L (2.4 imp gal; 2.9 US gal)
- Fuel consumption: 55.0 km/L

The Yamaha AG100 is a Yamaha motorcycle introduced in 1973 for use in agriculture, humanitarian aid and other rural professional use. It is only marketed in select regions, and is popular in Africa, Latin America, Australia, and New Zealand. Initial advertisements described it as, "built tough for tough Australian farm use". The bike has a single cylinder two-stroke engine, with five gears, and weighs 99 kg (218 lb) dry.

The motorbike has many features designed for hard rural use, including a full-enclosed O-ring chain drive, autolube, kick start, both left and right kickstands for parking on sloped ground, and generally being a simple bike to maintain and repair. New Zealand's Farm Trader describes it as, "the best all-round performer in the low-budget farm bike sector". The New Zealand Herald describes the bike as "King of the two strokes".

== Healthworker use in Africa ==
In the 21st century, the AG100 received media coverage for its popular role supporting healthworkers in Africa. As of 2015, the NGO Riders for Health maintains over 1,400 motorcycles, primarily the AG100, in seven African countries. The group cites the AG100 as a preferred choice due to its durability, ease of maintenance, and its small size being accessible to female healthworkers.

In 2012, the government of Rwanda distributed 237 AG100s, for community outreach on tuberculosis and malaria follow-up.

== See also ==
- Yamaha AG175
- Yamaha AG200
