= Blecher =

Blecher is a surname and may refer to:

- Max Blecher (1909–1938), Romanian writer
- Sara Blecher, South African film director
- Taddy Blecher, South African actuary, management consultant and educational entrepreneur
