= IBJ =

IBJ may refer to:

- Insulated block joint: rail joint incorporating insulation to isolate individual track circuits
- The Industrial Bank of Japan, Ltd: Japanese bank, one of the predecessors to Mizuho Financial Group
- Indianapolis Business Journal: a business publication in Indianapolis, Indiana
- International Bridges to Justice is a non-profit, non-governmental organization dedicated to protecting the basic legal rights of ordinary citizens in developing countries.
