= Nidan (NGO) =

Nidan is a non governmental organization which facilitates empowerment of the poor and marginalized sectors through community services and pro-poor participative interventions. Nidan has been intensively working with the people employed in unorganized sector in the states of Bihar, Rajasthan, Delhi and Jharkhand. It has two head offices located in Patna and West Vinod Nagar (East Delhi).

== Founding ==
Nidan was registered in the year 1996 under the Societies Registration Act, 1860. Nidan was founded by the current executive director of NASVI and Nidan.

== Chakachak Patna ==
The city of Patna generated 700 to 800 tonnes per day of municipal solid waste, and prior to 2008 had no door-to-door waste collection.

Nidan formed self-help groups and supported them with micro credit financing. They piloted an initiative, ‘Chakachak Patna’ with door-to-door waste collection for 300 households. This was done by a professional workforce of safai mitras (cleanliness friends).

The Patna Municipal Corporation recognized the value of this service and contracted Nidan to scale up operations to 5,000 households in 2008, by collecting a fee of INR 20 to 30 per month per household.

Nidan operations steadily grew to 63,000 households in 2014 and it increased its workforce for Chakachak Patna from 4 to 332. Due to the value of the service, the fee increased to 30 INR 70 per month per household.

As many of the safai mitras were women, Nidan also set up 10 creches to support 300 working women.

== Recognitions ==
Nidan has received many national and international awards.

1. Ashoka and Eisenhower Fellow
2. 1st Bihar Innovation Forum 27-28 Sept 2007 awarded 1st Prize in recognition of innovative work in “Organising Street Vendors”, by Bihar rural Livelihoods Promotion Society.
3. 1st Bihar Innovation Forum 27-28 Sept 2007 awarded 4th Prize in recognition of innovative work in “Localizing Insurance for the Poor”, by Bihar rural Livelihoods Promotion Society.
4. Microinsurance Awards 2007 by ING and Planet Finance, in 2007
5. Social Entrepreneur of the Year 2009 of the year by The Schwab Foundation at India Economic Summit
6. 2011 India Development Market Place, by World Bank
7. Social Entrepreneur of the Year – Skoll Foundation 2012
8. Star foundation development
