= Silverius Oscar Unggul =

Indonesian environmental activist

Silverius Oscar Unggul (born June 20, 1971 in Kendari, Southeast Sulawesi) is an Indonesian environmental activist. He is known for his work in improving natural resource management in Indonesia's regional economies. He founded the organization JAUH to preserve of Indonesian rainforests by helping villages develop sustainable timber economies.

== Works ==
He became involved with environmental protection while an agriculture student at Haluoleo University in Kendari. Along some friends, he began a non-profit organization called Yascita to expose illegal logging activities in Indonesia. Because no media outlet would publish his findings which were deemed controversial, he started his own news radio station called Radio Swara Alam (The Voice of Nature) in 1999. In 2003, he set up a local Television station called Kendari TV. Much of the programming on the station was run by local communities.

In 2002, he started Network For the Forest (JAUH), to help communities make a profit using safe logging techniques. They started by teaching farmers door-to-door to explain their organization's strategy. This uses a system of Eco-certifications, which follows standards laid out by the Forest Stewardship Council. Furniture and other goods that are labeled with this are able to be sold at a premium at retail outlets.

He later joined Telapak in 2006. He helped the organization transition from just environmental awareness to enacting community logging.

He obtained his master's degree at MM Corporate Social Responsibility (CSR) of Trisakti University. He is also working at CECT (Center for Entrepreneurship, Change and Third Sector), a think tank of the postgraduate programs MM Sustainability (previously MM CSR) and MM Community Entrepreneurship (CE) at the University of Trisakti, Jakarta.

in 2025 he was made Chief Advisor to the Ministry of Forestry.

== Awards ==
- WEF Young Global Leader in 2009
- Ashoka fellow
- Conde Nast Traveler Environment Award in 2008
- Skoll Award in 2010.
- Social Entrepreneur of the Year in Indonesia, 2008
- Liputan 6 SCTV award in 2010
