= Mothers2mothers =

International nonprofit organization

mothers2mothers
- Founded: 2001
- Founder: Mitch Besser (Founder/ Medical Director), Gene Falk (Co-Founder, Former CEO), Robin Allinson Smalley (Co-Founder/ International Director), Frank Beadle de Palomo (Current CEO)
- Type: Operating public charity (IRS exemption status): 501(c)(3)
- Purpose: Prevention of mother-to-child transmission of HIV
- Location: Cape Town, South Africa
- Revenue: $15.6 million (2009)
- Website: www.m2m.org

mothers2mothers is an international nonprofit organization dedicated to preventing mother-to-child transmission of HIV by providing education and support for pregnant women and new mothers living with HIV.

Founded in 2001, the organisation currently works in over 400 sites in seven countries in sub-Saharan Africa and employs over 1000 women living with HIV.

== History ==
mothers2mothers was founded by Mitchell Besser at Groote Schuur Hospital in Cape Town, South Africa, in 2001.

In January 2000 Besser moved to Cape Town, South Africa as a member of the University of Cape Town's Department of Obstetrics and Gynecology and as a consultant for the clinical roll-out of Prevention of Mother-to-Child Transmission (PMTCT) services at Groote Schuur Hospital.

While working at Groote Schuur, Besser realised that even when PMTCT medical treatment was available, it was often less than effective because of social, emotional and psychological barriers to success. To help break through those barriers, Besser identified South Africa's HIV-positive mothers as a "valuable, under-utilized resource." Besser enlisted new mothers living openly with HIV/AIDS who, as Mentor Mothers, began to connect with and educate their pregnant peers about the importance of PMTCT services, disclosing their status to loved ones, and living positive lives. The result of these efforts is mothers2mothers today.

In recent years, as the programme has expanded internationally, the organisation has taken on the name mothers2mothers + [Country X], e.g. mothers2mothers South Africa and mothers2mothers Kenya. However, worldwide and in the press, the organisation as a whole is known as mothers2mothers.

== Results ==
The mothers2mothers program currently operates in over 400 sites in the following countries:

- Eswatini
- Kenya
- Lesotho
- Malawi
- South Africa
- Tanzania
- Uganda

mothers2mothers employs over 1000 women living with HIV. Since 2001, mothers2mothers has enrolled over 1,000,000 HIV-positive pregnant women and new-mothers and logged nearly three million unique client interactions.

At least one source claims that in 2010, mothers2mothers enrolled approximately 300,000 unique HIV-positive pregnant women and new mothers into its program. However, a recent investigation by GiveWell has led that organisation to question the way mothers2mothers counts its clients.

== Awards and recognition ==
- 2006 Global Women's Health Award from the Albert Einstein College of Medicine of Yeshiva University in New York
- 2006 Ambassadors of Caring Award
- 2007 Platinum Award from I Impumelelo Social Innovations Centre (South Africa) for outstanding innovations that reduce poverty and address key developmental issues of national concern
- 2007 mothers2mothers is selected as one of the top 100 NGOs in the world (and the only African based organisation) for public private partnerships, in a study conducted for the UN and published in the Financial Times
- 2008 Dr Mitch Besser is awarded the Presidential Citizens Medal
- 2008 Skoll Award for Social Entrepreneurship
- 2009 Schwab Foundation Africa Regional Social Entrepreneur
- 2010 Global Health Council's Best Practices in Global Health Award

== Funding ==
=== Foundation funding ===
mothers2mothers has received funding from the Skoll Foundation, Mulago Foundation, Jasmine Social Investments, and other foundations.
