= Babban Gona =

Nigerian social enterprise organization

- Company type: Social enterprise
- Industry: Agriculture
- Founded: 2012
- Founder: Kola Masha, Lola Masha
- Headquarters: Nigeria
- Website: www.babbangona.com

Babban Gona, which means "Great Farm" in the Hausa language, is a social enterprise organization that provides support for smallholder farmers in Nigeria to become more profitable.

Babban Gona is partly owned by the farmers it serves.

== History ==
Babban Gona was founded in 2012 by Kola Masha with the aim of promoting agriculture and reducing unemployment in Nigeria. Kola temporarily relocated to a small village in the Northern part of Nigeria, which had been recently impacted by insurgent activities.

At inception, Babban Gona started and provide support for 100 members in Kaduna State, Nigeria. Babban Gona currently has its operations in 15 states namely; Abuja, Adamawa, Kaduna, Kano, Katsina, Bauchi, Plateau and Jigawa states. The company has provided support for over 110,000 smallholder farmers since its inception.

In April 2017, Babban Gona became the first Social Enterprise to win Skoll Foundation Awards. In 2017, Babban Gona received a $2.5m investment from the Global Innovation Fund.

=== Objective ===
To catalyse capital and fund the company’s expansion in order to tackle multiple constraints in smallholder farming with promising increases to farmer net incomes in an extremely poor region of Nigeria.

== How It Works ==
Babban Gona four key services to drive success for smallholder farmers:

1. Training and Education
2. Financial Credit
3. Agricultural Input
4. Harvesting & Marketing Support

Babban Gona provides support for smallholder farmers through what the company calls "Trust Groups", grassroots level farmer cooperatives. A group of 3-5 smallholder farmer members, with a trust group leader assigned to each group, who is selected after passing agronomic knowledge test and oral leadership interview. After a trust group is established, members of each trust group are trained on the following - agronomy, financial literacy, business skills and leadership through the BG Farm university platform. Babban Gona members have a loan repayment rate estimated to be at about 98%. Other trust group members are responsible for repaying if a trust group member defaults.
