= Albina Ruiz =

Peruvian activist

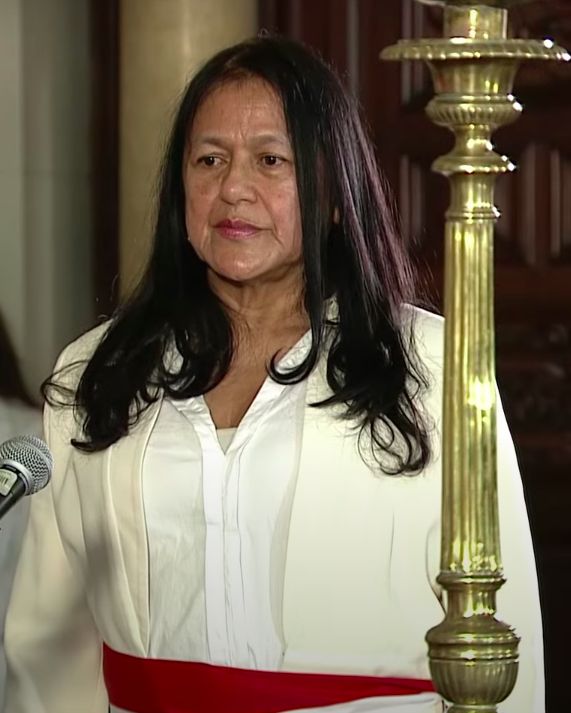
- Albina Ruiz in December 2022

Minister of Environment
- In office 10 December 2022 – 13 February 2024
- President: Dina Boluarte
- Prime Minister: Pedro Angulo Arana; Alberto Otárola
- Preceded by: Wilbert Rozas
- Succeeded by: Juan Carlos Castro Vargas

Personal details
- Party: Independent
- Education: National University of Engineering; Ramon Llull University

Albina Ruiz Ríos is a Peruvian environmentalist, social activist and social entrepreneur who served as the minister of environment of Peru from 10 December 2022 until 13 February 2024.

She is the founder and leader of Ciudad Saludable, a non-profit environmental health organisation based in Lima, Peru, and a Schwab Foundation fellow of the World Economic Forum.

== Biography ==
Ruiz was the only woman in her class at the National University of Engineering, where she majored in industrial engineering. She later earned an MA in Ecology and Environmental Management from the Ricardo Palma University and a PhD in Chemistry from Ramon Llull University in Barcelona.

She started working on health and environmental problems caused by uncollected household waste in Peru when she was a student. When Ruiz started her work in the Cono Norte neighborhood of Lima, 600 metric tonnes of waste were being generated daily, only half of which was collected by the city's collection service. The remainder was left to accumulate in unhygienic heaps, or left along public roads and in vacant lots. This situation existed in other towns throughout Peru, where waste can often be found dumped into rivers, contaminating the drinking water supply.

After writing her thesis, Ruiz came up with an idea for a new community-managed system of waste collection that she hoped would serve as a model for urban and rural communities around Peru. In 2001 she founded the group Ciudad Saludable, a social enterprise that aimed to turn waste collection into a profitable business.

The group trains local business owners to collect and process the waste, providing employment in a community with a chronically high unemployment rate. Ruiz helped the businesses in their startup phase, charging a monthly fee for the service of about US $1.50, and assisted the new startups with marketing schemes. One marketing campaign employed distribution of gift baskets to families to encourage them to use the services, and to pay for them on time.

As of 2014 the group had trained over 300 professionals from Peru, Brazil, Venezuela, Chile and Ecuador, overseeing projects in 20 cities across Peru, employing more than 150 people and providing services to over 3 million residents in Peru. Ruiz was subsequently asked by the Peruvian government to come up with a national plan, and led the creation of the first law in Peru (as well as Latin America) to regulate the activities of waste recyclers.

Ruiz and Ciudad Saludable developed a distance education program on waste management, with the Catholic University of Peru, in six versions of the program. They have has organized more than 1,500 waste collectors, creating employment and improving health and living conditions for over 6 million people living in rural and poor urban regions in Bolivia, Brazil, Colombia, Mexico, Peru, Venezuela and India.

In January 2019, she was appointed as the Vice Minister of Environmental Management at the Ministry of Environment of Peru. She held this position until October of the same year.

== Minister of Environment ==
On 10 December 2022, following the dismissal of President Pedro Castillo, Albina Ruiz was appointed minister of environment of Peru under the newly-inaugurated president Dina Boluarte. She held this position until February 13, 2024, when she resigned after presenting her opposition to the Forestry and Wildlife Law No. 31973 at the Council of Ministers, stating that the law would regularize illegal activities related to deforestation.

== Awards and recognition ==
Ruiz and Ciudad Saludable have received a number of honours, including a 1995 fellowship from the Ashoka Foundation, a 2006 fellowship from the Skoll Foundation, the 2007 Energy Globe Award; the 2006 Dubai International Award for Best Practices to Improve the Living Environment; the 2006 Global Development Network Award; and the 2006 Bravo Award from Latin Trade as Environmentalist of the Year in Latin America.
