= Yamaha AG200 =

AG200
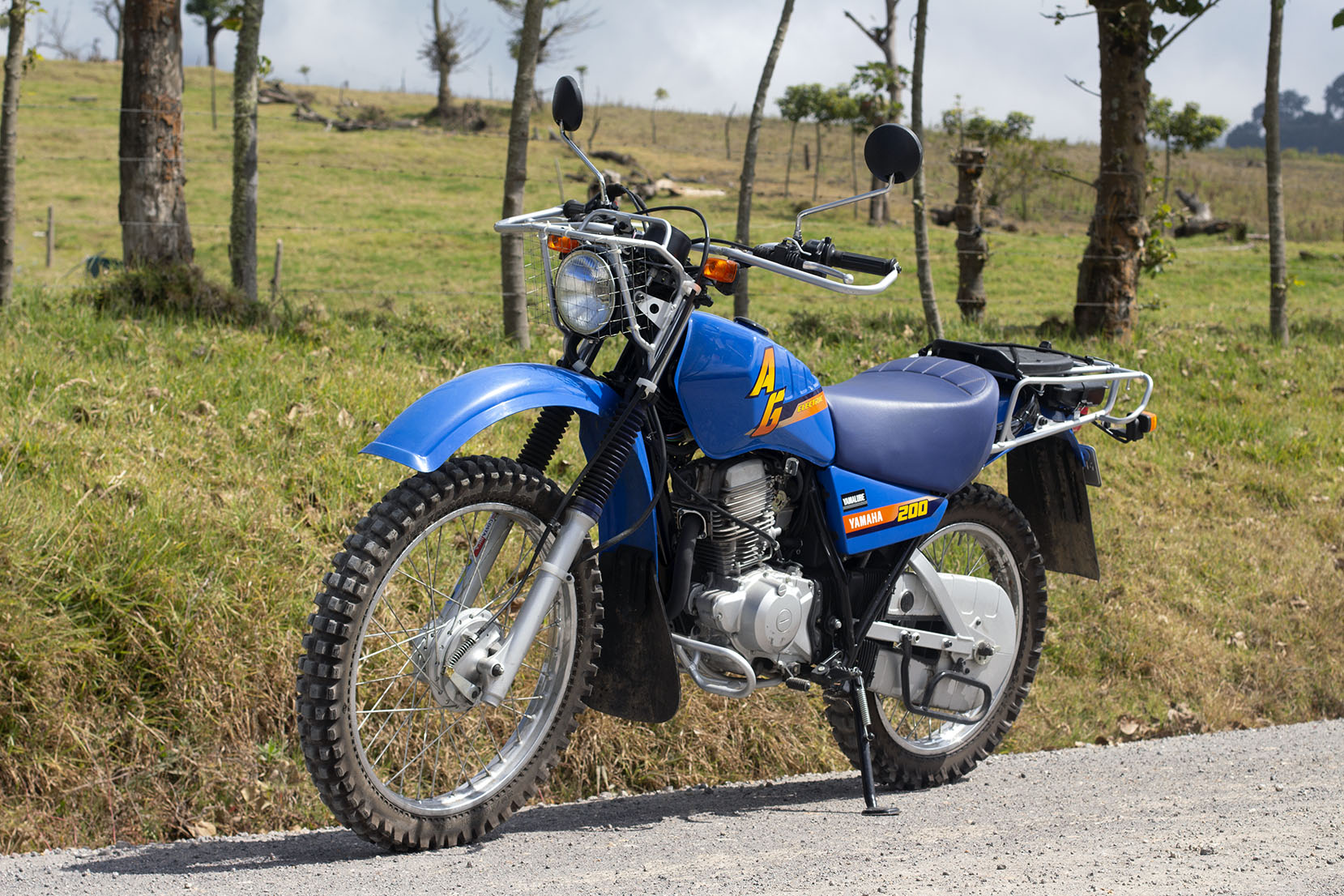
- Manufacturer: Yamaha
- Class: Agricultural; Military
- Engine: 196 cc (12.0 cu in) air-cooled, carbureted 4-stroke SOHC
- Bore / stroke: 67 mm × 55.7 mm (2.64 in × 2.19 in)
- Compression ratio: 9.5:1
- Ignition type: kick start, optional electric
- Transmission: 5-speed manual, chain final drive
- Suspension: Telescopic front, swingarm rear
- Brakes: Drum
- Tires: 3.00x21 front, 4.1x18 rear
- Wheelbase: 1,345 mm (53.0 in)
- Dimensions: L: 2,135 mm (84.1 in); W: 930 mm (37 in); H: 1,110 mm (44 in)
- Seat height: 820 mm (32 in)
- Weight: 112 kg (247 lb) (wet)
- Fuel capacity: 10 L (2.2 imp gal; 2.6 US gal)
- Related: Yamaha AG100; Yamaha AG175

The AG200 is a motorcycle made by Yamaha for use in agriculture, military, humanitarian aid and other rural professional use. It is only available in select markets, including Africa, Australia, Latin America and New Zealand.

The AG200 ships stock with numerous unusual components aimed at utility and survivability, including

- Dual side stands with enlarged "feet"
- Sealed drum brakes
- Front and extended rear cargo racks
- Encased drive chain
- Crash bars on the handlebars, engine and chain
- Clutch lock
- N-1-2-3-4-5 gear arrangement

== See also ==
- Yamaha AG100
- Yamaha AG175
