= Karen I. Tse =

American human rights defender

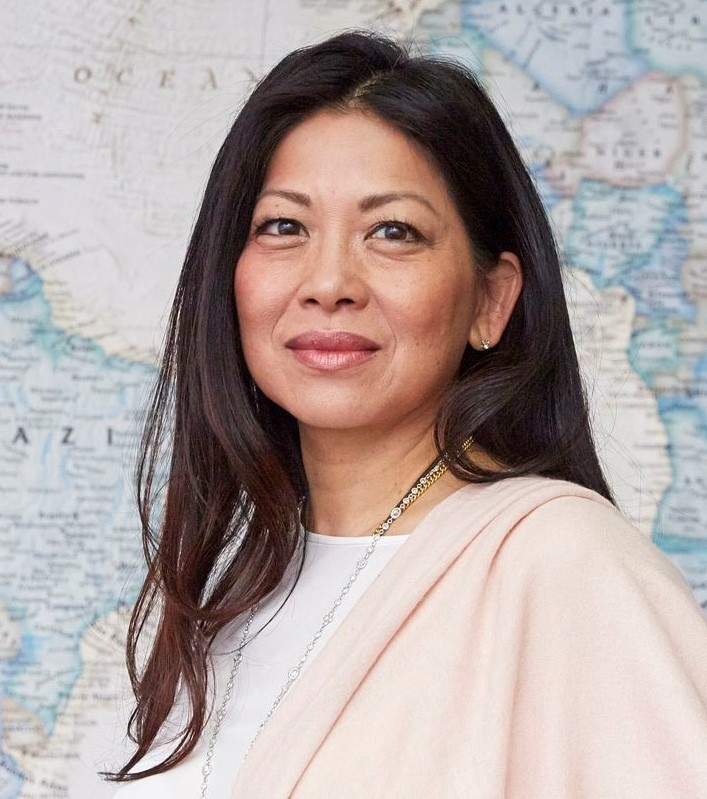
- Born: Karen Irene Tse; October 20, 1964 (age 61); Cleveland, Ohio
- Education: Scripps College (B.A.); Harvard University (M.Div.); University of California, Los Angeles (J.D.)
- Occupation: Lawyer

Karen Irene Tse (born October 20, 1964) is a Swiss American of Chinese descent, and lives in Geneva. Tse is primarily concerned with human rights and is the founder and CEO of the global non-profit International Bridges to Justice which advocates for legal rights in more than 50 developing countries.

== Education ==
An international human rights attorney and ordained Unitarian Universalist minister, Reverend Karen I. Tse has pioneered Rule of Law initiatives across the globe. Tse received her master's degree from Harvard University School of Divinity, her J.D. degree from the University of California at Los Angeles (UCLA) School of Law, and also holds an honorary doctorate in theology. She obtained her bachelor's degree from Scripps College.

== Career ==
From 1991 to 1994 Tse was a legal aid lawyer with the San Francisco Public Defender's Office in California. After that, she was the deputy director and Supervising Attorney for the Cambodian Defenders Project in Phnom Penh, Cambodia and from 1996 to 1997, she was a Judicial Mentor for the United Nations Center for Human Rights in Cambodia.

In 2000, Tse founded International Bridges to Justice (IBJ), a non-profit organization which aims to eradicate torture in the 21st century and protect due process rights for accused people throughout the world. IBJ is dedicated to protecting the legal rights of everyday citizens in developing countries, and has a special focus on the indigent accused. The organization also institutionalizes defender practices by training public defenders, and legal aid lawyers, in countries where their help is needed.

Under Tse’s leadership, IBJ has become a leading advocate for legal reform and human rights. Through a system change approach, IBJ is creating the conditions for a “new normal in justice” in which citizens will have access to justice early in their imprisonment, thus ending the use of torture as an investigative tool. As of 2023, IBJ has a presence in 53 countries, with permanent country programs in 13 countries. Over the past 2 decades, IBJ has supported more than 48,000 lawyers and defenders who have represented more than 500,000 detainees. IBJ has also reached over 40 million people through rights awareness campaigns around the world. Working globally both on the ground and online, IBJ has an active online presence through Criminal DefenseWiki pages for 120+ countries and 152 eLearning modules for over 20 countries, with over 28 million hits for both platforms combined since its creation.

Tse's method is unique, being both bottom-up and top-down, inspired by her twin roles of minister and lawyer. The group supports on-the-ground defense lawyers, but also interacts with police, prosecutors and judges rather than treating them as "the enemy," since they are the entities committing or condoning the abuses. Likewise, IBJ focuses on individual cases but also seeks to reform the overall public justice systems where it operates. This idea of "embracing the other side," as well as working at the individual and system-wide level, makes Tse's and IBJ's work distinctive, and effective.

== Awards and recognition ==
Tse has received and continues to receive global recognition for her work from a wide variety of sources. She was named by U.S. News & World Report as one of America’s Best Leaders in 2007, in 2008 was honored as the recipient of the Harvard Divinity School "first decade" award, in 2009 received the Gleitsman International Award at the Harvard Kennedy School of Government and that that same year receiving the 2008 American Bar Association’s International Human Rights Award. In 2014 Tse received the WIN Inspiring Women Worldwide Award, an award that recognizes women who model values of global leadership, authentic contribution and integration of noble values, for her contributions to humanity. In 2017 she received the Asian Pacific American Bar Association Public Service Award, and in 2018 the Harvard Divinity School honored her with the Distinguished Gomes award. In between she has also received awards from the Skoll Foundation, Ashoka and Echoing Green as a leading social entrepreneur.

Tse also contributes her time to a number of committees, including the Harvard Divinity School Global Task Force (GTF), the Skoll Awardee Steering Committee, the Racial Equity Leadership Group convened by Echoing Green, and The Schwab Foundation for Social Entrepreneurship, with the support of the World Economic Forum.

== Speaking Engagements ==
Tse is frequently invited to speak about her work, and past appearances have included the United Nations, World Bank, the World Economic Forum, Harvard University and the Skoll World Forum, among others. Her 2011 TEDTalk was named as one of the top 18 great ideas of the year by TED and Huffington Post. Her work has been featured in publications such as The New York Times, The Wall Street Journal, and Forbes Magazine.
