= INJAZ =

Non-profit organisation

- إنجاز
- Founded: 1999; 27 years ago
- Purpose: Youth, Education, Employment, Entrepreneurship
- Headquarters: Amman, Jordan
- Chairperson: Haethum Buttikhi
- Vice Chairperson: Ahmad Tijani
- Employees: 90+
- Website: https://injaz.org.jo/

INJAZ is a non-profit organization founded in 1999. Headquartered in Amman, Jordan, it provides vocational training courses for children and youth from developing nations. The organization runs more than 44 initiatives in all twelve of Jordan's governorates, working with 3000 schools, 41 universities and colleges, and 50 youth centers.

== History ==
Established in 1999, INJAZ originally operated as a project under Save the Children, funded by the United States Agency for International Development (USAID) and by Jordanian Queen Rania al Abdullah. The project was relaunched in 2001 as an independent nonprofit organization, led by Soraya Salti. Jordan enrolled over 100,000 students by the 2010-2011 school year.

INJAZ provides young people with vocational training and entrepreneurship skills. The organization receives support from Jordan's business and professional community, which contributes funds, as well as volunteer teachers and leaders.

In 2018 INJAZ established mySTARTUP, a subsidiary incubator program that helps youth and women entrepreneurs launch startups. The current operational capacity of mySTARTUP allows it to incubate 100 startups a year.

== Locations ==
INJAZ is headquartered in Amman, Jordan, and operates field offices in various locations across the country, including Irbid, Zarqa, Al Karak, Wadi Musa, Tafilah and Aqaba.
