= Nicola Galombik =

South African social entrepreneur and businesswoman

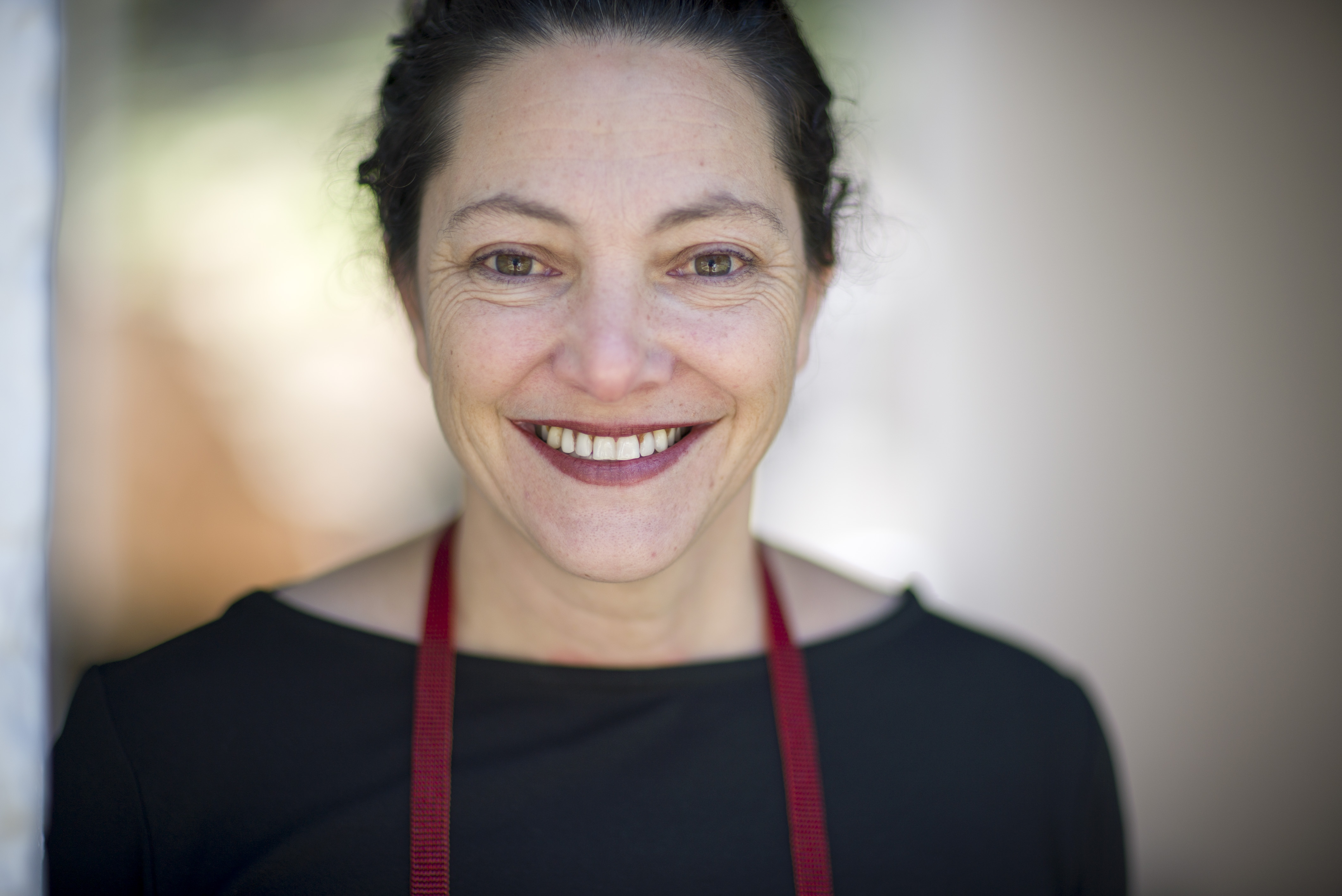
- Nicola Galombik
- Occupations: Investor, Social Entrepreneur
- Known for: Chairman of the Board of Harambee Youth Employment Accelerator

Nicola Galombik is a South African social entrepreneur and businesswoman, known for founding Harambee Youth Employment Accelerator, an award-winning South African nonprofit. She currently serves as the executive director of Yellowwoods, an investment holding company based in South Africa. Her career has included developing policy for the government of Nelson Mandela, and creating the education strategy for South African Broadcasting Corporation.

== Education ==
Nicola Galombik received her bachelor's degree in film, Politics & Psychology with honors from University of the Witwatersrand in 1988 before earning her master's degree in Cinema and Media Studies from New York University in 1992.

== Professional life ==
Galombik is the executive director of Yellowwoods Investments, an investment holding company based in South Africa. Prior to joining Yellowwoods in 2010, she worked as the managing director of Converse Consulting from 2004 to 2009. She was the Head of Television strategy at South African Broadcasting Corporation from 1996 to 2003 where she established their education department, and the Head of Local Content for the Independent Broadcasting Authority from 1994 to 1996. Previously, she was involved in several anti-apartheid organizations and also helped develop policy for Nelson Mandela's first administration.

=== Harambee Youth Employment Accelerator ===
Galombik founded Harambee Youth Employment Accelerator in 2010 to address high youth unemployment in South Africa, caused by a large demographic "bulge" of youth reaching working age and to solve a supply and demand mismatch between labor and employers. In Swahili "Harambee" means "we all pull together". Galombik has served as the board chair since the founding of the organization. The organization was incubated by Galombik's investment firm, Yellowwoods, in partnership with the South African Government's National Treasury's Jobs Fund. Harambee connects first-time job seekers to employer partners through a mobile-accessed network that assesses and trains first time job seekers for their first job. By creating a large network of workers that is easily navigable and proving that youth can be successfully retained using this method, Harambee has been able to scale their efforts and effectiveness. Harambee began with a goal of connecting 10,000 unemployed South African youth to jobs and has now provided 100,000 first-time job seekers with employment opportunities at over 500 companies. The non-profit and its leadership have been recognized with awards and funding from organizations such as the Skoll Foundation and USAID.

== Honors, decorations, awards and distinctions ==
Galombik was recognized in 2020 by the Schwab Foundation as one of their Innovators of the Year. She was awarded the Skoll Award for Social Entrepreneurship in 2019. She is a fellow of the African Leadership Initiative and African Leadership Network, and the IGD Frontier 100. She was also a 2015 John P. McNulty Prize Laureate and a member of the Aspen Global Leadership Network. She also received a Fulbright Scholarship to attend New York University.

== Publications, talks and interviews ==
Galombik has served as a panelist for the African Leadership Academy's Decennial Symposium on Enabling Social Enterprise, and has spoken at the GIBS Business School as well. She has also been interviewed by the Rockefeller Foundation's #Solvable podcast.

== See also ==
- Youth Unemployment in South Africa
