= Yamaha AG175 =

Model of farm motorcycle

The Yamaha AG175 was a farm motorcycle manufactured from the mid-1970s into the early 1990s by the Yamaha Motor Company. The AG175 was based upon the Yamaha CT3 and received only minor updates during its lifespan.

The AG175 had an air-cooled, single cylinder, two-stroke engine with autolube. It was equipped with a front and rear rack, enclosed drive chain and other features to make it suitable for agricultural use.

== See also ==
- Yamaha AG100
- Yamaha AG200
