= Julie Cordua =

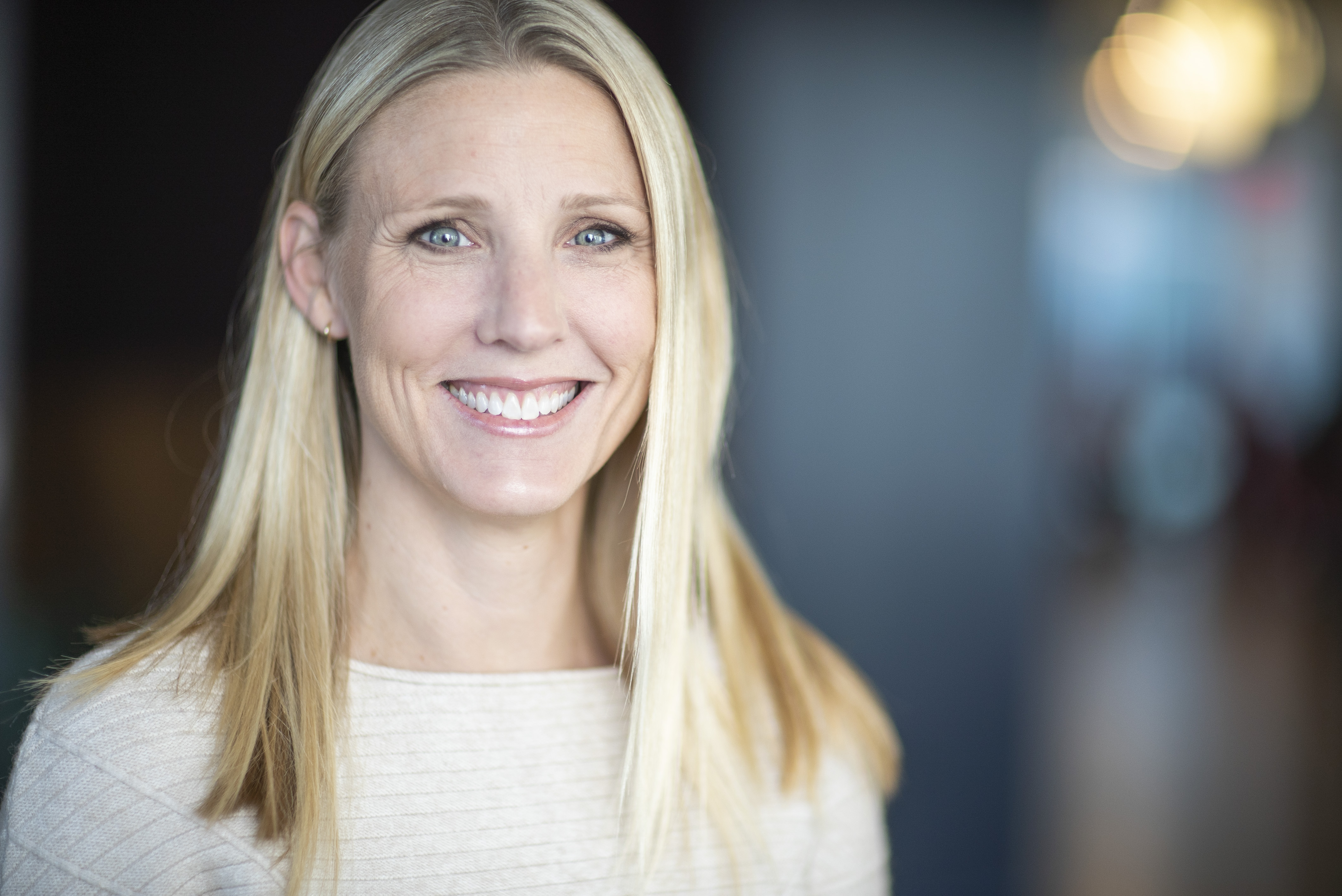
- Born: Lindsay, California
- Education: University of California, Los Angeles; Northwestern University; Kellogg School of Management
- Occupations: CEO, Social Entrepreneur
- Organization: Thorn

Julie Cordua is an American entrepreneur serving as the chief executive officer and executive director of Thorn since 2012, and previously serving as the vice president of marketing at (RED).

== Early life and education ==
Cordua was born and raised in Lindsay, California. Cordua has an MBA from the Kellogg School of Management at Northwestern University and a bachelor’s degree in communications from UCLA.

== Career ==
Cordua spent nearly ten years in the wireless industry, leading Motorola's global marketing efforts for 5 years, where she helped launch the Razr. Following her work at Motorola, she joined and helped establish Helio, a wireless startup, as director of buzz marketing.

=== Thorn ===
Cordua left her job at RED to join co-founders Ashton Kutcher and Demi Moore launch Thorn, a nonprofit that develops technology to combat online child sexual abuse, and subsequently became its CEO. Under her leadership, Thorn developed Spotlight, a tool used by law enforcement to identify trafficking victims, and Safer, which helps online platforms detect child sexual abuse material.

In 2017 Cordua noted in Recode that Thorn had an unusual business model, as a non-profit that was also driven by products and technology. Thorn also started another program, their Innovation Lab, to collaborate with tech companies including Google, Facebook, Microsoft, Expedia, IAC, Sabre, Twitter, Amazon Web Services and Pinterest to police child sexual abuse material on their sites. In 2019, Thorn was one of eight organizations that were awarded a total of $280 million in funding by the TED launched Audacious Project.

== Honors ==
Cordua has been the recipient of several notable awards and honors for her work with Thorn, including being named as one of the Forbes Leaders Proving Tech Is A Force For Social Innovation in 2019. She was also a recipient of the Skoll Award for Social Entrepreneurship the same year. In 2017, Cordua was number 51 on the Recode 100 honoree list.

== Works and publications ==
- Cordua, Julie (April 2019) "How We Won Millions of Dollars from TED to End Child Pornography" Marie Claire
- Cordua, Julie (2019) “How we can eliminate child sexual abuse material from the internet” Ted.com
- Cordua, Julie (November 2013) “Creating An Army of Digital Defenders To Stop Child Sexual Exploitation” Huffington Post

== Personal life ==
Cordua currently resides in Southern California, along with her three children.
