= Gemma Mortensen =

Social entrepreneur and non-profit executive

- Education: University of Oxford
- Occupations: Social entrepreneur, non-profit executive
- Organization: New Constellations
- Awards: WEF Young Global Leader (2011); Skoll Award (2013); CNN Inspirational Women (2014); Yale World Fellow (2015)

Gemma Mortensen is an English social entrepreneur. She is the founder and co-creator of New Constellations and co-founder of More In Common. She previously served as Chief Global Officer at Change.org and Chief Executive Officer of Crisis Action.

Mortenson has won the Skoll Award for Social Entrepreneurship and the CNN Inspirational Women Award. She has been named a Yale World Fellow and a World Economic Forum Young Global Leader.

She co-chaired the World Economic Forum’s Global Council on systems leadership, and worked in the European Commission, at the UN, and as a journalist.

== Education ==
Mortensen holds a Bachelor of Arts with first-class honors in politics, philosophy and economics from Oxford University and a European Master's degree in human rights and democratization.

== Career ==
Mortensen served as Executive Director and Chief Executive Officer of Crisis Action, an organization that coordinates networks of human rights, humanitarian, and foreign policy organizations. Under her leadership, Crisis Action was awarded the 2012 MacArthur Award for Creative and Effective Institutions by the MacArthur Foundation and the 2013 Skoll Award for Social Entrepreneurship. In 2014, she led a session on networking and collaboration at the Skoll World Forum.

In August 2015, Mortensen was hired as Chief Global Officer at Change.org, assuming the role in January 2016.

Mortensen is the founder of New Constellations, a platform for individuals and communities, such as disadvantaged towns in Scotland, to explore social, political, and economic models. She is also a co-founder of More In Common, a nonprofit that has worked on the European refugee crisis, where she has served as Chair and Vice-Chair of the board. In April 2017, she authored an article titled "10 Things You Need to Build Clever Coalitions" for the Stanford Social Innovation Review.
