= Chris Underhill =

English social entrepreneur

Chris Underhill is an English social entrepreneur.

== Education ==
He graduated with a Bachelor of Science from the University of London and later with a Master of Science in International Policy from the School for Policy Studies, University of Bristol. He worked for Voluntary Service Overseas in Zambia, an experience which led him into a career in development where he has specialised in leadership, disability, mental health and appropriate technology.

== Career ==
Underhill has founded a number of organizations including the Thrive charity organization (formerly known as Horticultural Therapy), a UK-based charity working with disabled people and medical professionals targeting disabled people in the third world in horticulture, gardening and agriculture, and BasicNeeds, which works with people with mental disorders and their carers in Ghana, Uganda, Kenya, Tanzania, India, Sri Lanka, Nepal, Lao PDR and Vietnam. and in 2019 he co-founded The Elders Council for Social Entrepreneurs

Underhill has also been chief executive of the Intermediate Technology Development Group (now Practical Action), the charity founded by E. F. Schumacher, author of Small Is Beautiful.

He went on to found the UK member organization of International Development Enterprises known as IDE UK and he is currently Chair of the Ashden Awards for Sustainable Energy.

He is also a Member of the Board of Impetus. And was the founding Chair and trustee of the Leaders' Quest Foundation, from 2004-2011. Formerly he was a board member of Headstrong, the National Centre for Youth Mental Health in Ireland, the Chair of Action Health which amalgamated with Skillshare International in 2000, Digital Links (retired July 2007), Friends of APD (founder Chair) and Oxfam Chair of Committee for Africa, Staff (HR), and Trustee Role and Council Structure working party whose task was the reorganisation of the Board of Trustees.

He was the joint author with Audrey Cloet of the 1982 book Gardening is for Everyone (ISBN 9780285649545). and is an author and contributor to a number of works which include:

"Barriers to improving mental health services in low and middle income countries", and "Mental Health and Development" in Selected Readings in Community Based Rehabilitation: Disability and Rehabilitation Issues in South Asia.

In 2012 he was elected as a Senior Ashoka Fellow.

Underhill received the esteemed Skoll Award for Social Entrepreneurship 2013 which recognised his commitment towards: 'altering peace and human security practices that prevent the most marginalized or vulnerable from accessing and benefiting from the system'. The Skoll Award marked the significant contribution made by Underhill to the field of global mental health through BasicNeeds.

== Awards ==
In 2014, Underhill was recognized for his contribution to the field of mental health by being selected as a Schwab Foundation Social Entrepreneur of the year. The award gives entrepreneurs the opportunity to participate in various events and initiatives of the World Economic Forum.

In 2013, Underhill also received the esteemed Skoll Award for Social Entrepreneurship. Each year the Skoll Foundation presents the Skoll Award for Social Entrepreneurship to a highly selective group of outstanding individuals from hundreds of applications. The award marked the significant contribution made by Underhill to the field of global mental health through BasicNeeds.

In 2012, Underhill was elected as a Senior Ashoka Fellow.

In 2011, elected Mayor of Leamington Spa, Alan Wilkinson, chose BasicNeeds as one of his three official charities for his year in office. BasicNeeds was also "highly commended" by the Charity Awards in 2011.

In 1999 he was awarded an MBE, for his work with international and UK disability.
