= Gillian Caldwell =

American social entrepreneur and climate policy leader

- Citizenship: United States
- Education: Harvard University (BA); Georgetown University Law Center (JD)
- Occupations: Social entrepreneur; Lawyer; Filmmaker; Climate policy leader
- Awards: Schwab Award (2001); Skoll Award (2005)

Chief Climate Officer of the United States Agency for International Development
- In office August 2021 – 2024

Chief Executive Officer of Global Witness
- In office July 2015 – 2019

Executive Director of WITNESS
- In office 1998–2007
- Website: gilliancaldwell.com

Gillian Caldwell is an American social entrepreneur, attorney, filmmaker, climate policy leader, and human rights advocate. She has served as Executive Director of WITNESS, Campaign Director of 1Sky, CEO of Global Witness, Co-Director of the Global Survival Network, and Chief Climate Officer of the United States Agency for International Development (USAID). Her work has focused on preventing human trafficking, documenting human rights abuses, climate policy, and social entrepreneurship.

== Early life and education ==
Caldwell graduated from Harvard University with a BA in Social Sciences in 1988. She earned a JD from Georgetown University Law Center in 1992 as a Public Interest Law Scholar and was admitted to the New York State Bar in 1993 and the District of Columbia Bar and the United States District Court for the District of Columbia in 1994.

== Career ==
From 1995 to 1997, Caldwell co-directed the Global Survival Network, investigating organized crime, environmental degradation, and human trafficking.She produced and directed the 1997 documentary Bought & Sold, which exposed international human trafficking networks and contributed to advocacy leading to the Victims of Trafficking and Violence Protection Act of 2000.

From 1998 to 2007, Caldwell served as Executive Director of WITNESS, expanding the use of video to document human rights abuses. WITNESS footage was used in proceedings before the United Nations, the prosecution of Slobodan Milosevic, and the Sierra Leone Truth Commission.

As Campaign Director of 1Sky from 2007 to 2010, Caldwell helped build a coalition of more than 600 organizations advocating for federal climate legislation.

Caldwell became CEO of Global Witness in July 2015, an organization that campaigns against international corruption, and has also been awarded the Skoll Award for Social Entrepreneurship. In August 2021, she was appointed Chief Climate Officer and Deputy Assistant Administrator of the United States Agency for International Development (USAID). Her tenure ended in December, 2024.

== Recognition ==
Caldwell received the Skoll Award for Social Entrepreneurship (2005–2007), the Tech Award for Human Rights (2003), the Schwab Foundation Award for Social Entrepreneurship (2001), and the Rockefeller Foundation Next Generation Leaders Award (2000). She has been an MIT Media Lab Director's Fellow since 2014 and previously held an Echoing Green Graduate Public Service Fellowship.

=== Videography and filmography ===
Year	Title	Role	Notes
2013	Citizen Koch	Producer / Engagement Manager	Premiered at the Sundance Film Festival in the U.S. Documentary Competition.
2006	Outlawed: Extraordinary Rendition, Torture and Disappearances in the "War on Terror"	Producer / Director	Featured selection at the Council on Foundations Film Festival.
2001	Behind the Labels: Sweatshops on US Saipan	Executive Producer	Broadcast on the Oxygen network; received the Sidney Hillman Prize for Broadcast Journalism.
1997	Bought & Sold: An Investigative Documentary on the International Trade in Women	Producer / Director	Undercover exposé featured on ABC, CNN, and the BBC; utilized in congressional advocacy.

=== Books ===
- Video for Change: A Guide to Advocacy and Activism (2005) — Co-editor and chapter author. Pluto Press / University of Michigan Press.
