= Community & Individual Development Association =

South African education non-profit

The Community & Individual Development Association (CIDA or COMMUNITY) is a non-profit, educational development organisation that was founded in 1979 and is located in Johannesburg, South Africa.

== Description ==
CIDA was formed in 2000 to provide disadvantaged students with an almost cost-free, university education. The foundation describes itself as an organisation that facilitates projects that provide large-scale, low-cost, education for the disadvantaged. The university was founded in part by funding from the Educating Africa foundation. After each project is established, it has the option to become independent or continue under the umbrella of CIDA . CIDA was considered by some to be the "poster child" for the Free Tertiary Education movement in South Africa. Its contributors include local companies as well as JP Morgan and Dell.

== History and projects ==
CIDA's projects include: Soweto Craft and Self-Development Centre (1979), Crossroads Self-Development Centre (1980), Sagewood School (1985), training for 10,000 teachers and students in Qwa Qwa (1985), Soweto Self-Learning Centre (1993), training for 200 Peace Corp workers (1994), training for 400 teachers in Kwazulu-Natal (1996), training for 9,000 teachers and students in Alexandra and establishment of the Community Individual Development Trust (2005). The Branson School of Entrepreneurship was established in 2006 and was named after its contributor Richard Branson. In 2007 Taddy Blecher, the CEO of CIDA, received a $1 million dollar award from the Skoll Foundation. In 2008 CIDA founded Innovation TOWN, Invincible South Africa and Consciousness-Based Education (CBE) South Africa and received the Ezemvelo nature reserve as a donation from the Oppenheimers family. The Invincible Outsourcing organisation was launched in 2009 and a year later the Replication Centre was founded along with the Ezemvelo Eco-campus, the $10 College Fund and the Thank You Foundation.

=== CIDA City Campus ===
The CIDA City Campus was founded in 2000 with the goal of offering low-cost tertiary education. In 2003 it received a $1.3-dollar donation from Oprah Winfrey for a girls dormitory. Co-founder, Taddy Blecher "left Cida [sic] in 2007 to start another free educational body, the Maharishi Institute" after "Blecher's promotion of transcendental meditation [sic] upset some of Cida's [sic] donors." CIDA City Campus launched an educational program called, Mastery Academy of Construction, and began receiving financial support from the construction company Murray & Roberts, Barloworld and its Letsema Sizwe Trust in 2007. The CIDA City Campus was closed in December, 2014 after facing a financial crisis. .

=== Maharishi Institute ===
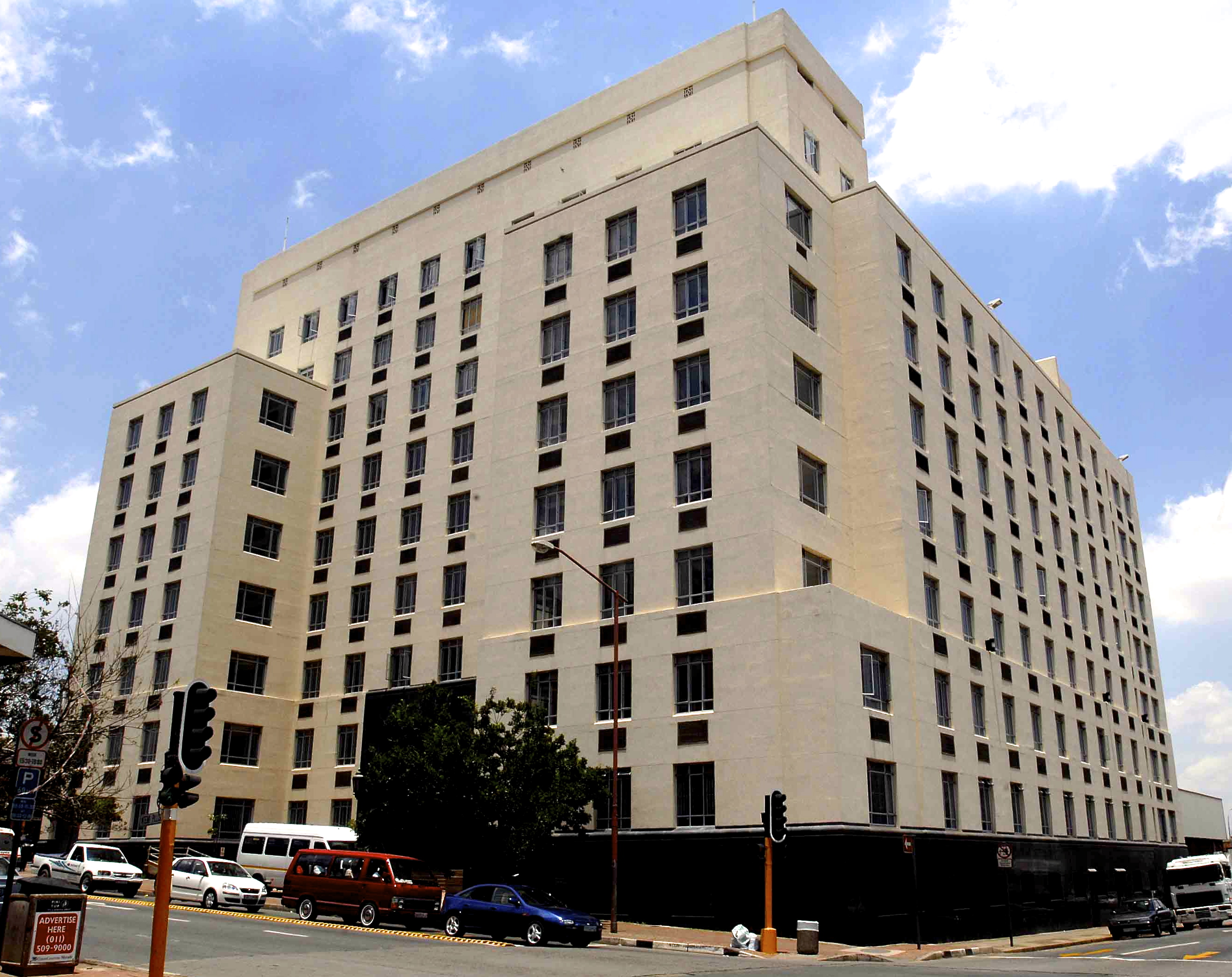
Maharishi Invincibility Institute in Johannesburg, South Africa

The Maharishi Institute was founded in 2007 under the "tertiary education model" and was visited by Russell Simmons a year later. It is located in the business district of Johannesburg and is one of many international schools and universities that utilise the Transcendental Meditation technique as part of their curriculum. The institute's goal is to provide disadvantaged students with an "accelerated holistic education" that includes employment at the university during their course of study. The goal of the work/study program is to allow the university to become self funded. Initial funding and grants for the institute were provided by Educating Africa foundation. The institute was established by the founders of CIDA City Campus with the goal of further addressing the issue of accessible tertiary education through the method of Consciousness-Based education. The Maharishi Institute's goal is to set a precedent in the field of higher education that could be replicated in other African cities. In 2015, SAP SA created a "broad-based black economic empowerment (BBBEE) trust" whose dividends would fund the Maharishi Institute.

== See also ==
- Transcendental Meditation in education
