= Mushtaq Chhapra =

Pakistani Industrialist, Philanthropist, Diplomat and Businessman

- Occupations: Chairman, Industrialist, Philanthropist, Diplomat, Consulate General, businessman and politician
- Known for: founding The Citizens Foundation, Patients Aid Foundation, and The Kidney Centre
- Children: Shariq Chhapra, Shazim Chhapra, Nabil Chhapra, Rija Chhapra
- Awards: •Sitara-e-imtiaz •Skoll Award •Ramon Magsaysay Award •Qatar Wise Award

Mushtaq Kassim Chhapra is a Pakistani industrialist, philanthropist, and diplomat who is the founder of The Citizens Foundation, Patients Aid Foundation, and The Kidney Centre. He hails from one of the founding families of Pakistan.

Born to a politically influential Memon family in Karachi in 1949, Chhapra finished his education in public service and stepped into his father's business of manufacturing and development. With a passion to serve humanity from an early age, Chhapra has also been actively engaged in welfare and community activities. He is the founder of some of the most successful welfare initiatives in Pakistan. He also serves as chairman of the largest network of NGOs in Asia. Chhapra has played a vital role in the development of Pakistan. Furthermore, he serves as Counsel General of Nepal, a title inherited from his late father Kassim Chhapra.

He is a business magnate and has established factories and manufacturing plants as the founder and Chairman of Coastal Synthetics, CBM, Transpak and Chhapra group of companies multinational since 1976.

He was the General Secretary of the Pakistan Jamaat from the mid-1970s to the 1990s.

== Early life and career ==
Born to Prominent Memon business family, Chhapra was interested in social work from an early age. In 1985, Chhapra began The Kidney Centre (KC). In 1990, he set-up the Patients' Aid Foundation. In 1995, he co-founded The Citizens Foundation.

== Awards and honours ==
•Sitara-e-imtiaz

•Skoll Award

- WISE Award Qatar
- Ramon Magsaysay Award
- CDC Award

== Board Member ==
He has served as the Consulate General of Nepal since 1996 and sits on several boards:

- Institute of Business Administration (IBA) since 2021
- Pakistan Chamber of Commerce since 2021
- Shaheed Mohtarma Benazir Bhutto Institute of Trauma (SMBBIT) since 2022
- National Institute of Cardiovascular Diseases (NICVD) since 2024
