= Sonali Khan =

Indian social impact leader and human rights defender

- Citizenship: India
- Education: Delhi University (MSc); Jawaharlal Nehru University (MA)
- Occupations: Social entrepreneur; Human rights defender
- Years active: 2006–present
- Organizations: Sesame Workshop India — Managing Director (2018–present); Dasra — Director of Knowledge Creation and Dissemination; Breakthrough (India/US) — Vice President, later Country Director (2006–2018); CREA — Communications
- Awards: Skoll Award (2016)

Sonali Khan is an Indian social impact leader and human rights advocate who has worked on gender equality, early childhood education, and the prevention of violence against women and girls. She is currently the Managing Director of the Sesame Workshop in India. Khan leads the development of educational initiatives and Galli Galli Sim Sim, which is India's adaptation of Sesame Street and is watched by over 150 million children across India.

She previously served as Vice President of Breakthrough India and was a recipient of the 2016 Skoll Award for Social Entrepreneurship.

== Education ==
Sonali Khan holds an MSc in Child Development from Delhi University, and a post-grad political science degree from Jawaharlal Nehru University.

== Career ==
Khan began her professional career as a television journalist covering politics and business. Next, she worked for TV18 and StarTV India, researching and producing storylines.

Her first role in human rights work was at the feminist human rights non-profit organization CREA, where she worked in communications.

In 2006, Khan joined Breakthrough India as Vice President and country director, where she worked alongside founder Mallika Dutt on media campaigns, community mobilization, leadership training, and advocacy to change social norms surrounding gender-based violence and discrimination. She tackled issues such as early marriages, domestic violence, sexual harassment, skewed sex ratios, and women’s rights, campaigning both in the US and in India.

She ran Breakthrough's international Bell Bajao! campaign against domestic violence as well as the What Kind Of Man Are You? campaign that encouraged men to wear condoms for HIV/AIDS prevention. What Kind Of Man Are You? reached 2 million people, while Bell Bajao! reached 130 million people. Through its media campaigns, Breakthrough reached a total of 15 million people in rural communities and 350 million across India and the US.

In 2018, Khan joined the philanthropic foundation Dasra as Director of Knowledge Management, working on projects related to urban sanitation, adolescent girls’ rights, democracy, and justice. At Dasra, she tackled issues such as education, sexual and reproductive health, and early marriage. Khan led Dasra's Ab Meri Baari campaign which reached 26 million people.

Towards the end of 2018, she joined Sesame Workshop India, where she currently leads the educational programs across multiple channels and formats. In 2021, under her leadership, content published on the company's newly launched YouTube channel was viewed by over 67 million children within its first year of inception.

She has also served on the Board of Plan International.

== Recognition ==
In 2016, Sonali Khan and Mallika Dutt received the Skoll Award for Social Entrepreneurship for their leadership of Breakthrough. The Skoll Foundation recognized their work in preventing gender-based violence by changing social norms through media, leadership development, advocacy, and community mobilization. The award recognized Breakthrough as one of six organizations selected that year for large-scale social impact.
