= Lola Masha =

Business executive

- Citizenship: Nigerian
- Education: University of Virginia (BSc)
- Alma mater: UC Berkeley College of Chemistry (PhD)
- Occupations: Technology and agriculture executive
- Years active: 2007–present
- Known for: Co-founder of Babban Gona; former Country Manager of OLX Nigeria
- Title: Executive Director, Babban Gona
- Awards: Beacon ICT Classified Advert Website of the Year (representing OLX)

Lola Masha is a Nigerian technology executive. She is the country manager for OLX, and was previously business development team head for Google Nigeria. She is the co-founder and executive director of Babban Gona farmers service limited.

== Education ==
Masha is an engineering graduate from University of Virginia. She had her PhD in chemical engineering at UC Berkeley College of Engineering.

== Career ==
She worked for McKinsey & Company as a consultant in 2007. She then worked with Google Nigeria as the business development team head for four years.

In 2014 Masha joined OLX, the e-commerce website, as the country manager. She is today the chief executive officer and country manager for OLX in Nigeria. She represented OLX and received the award for Classified Advert Website of the year at the seventh edition of the Beacon ICT award ceremony.

At the fifth anniversary of OLX, Masha urged the Nigeria government to ensure a valid means of identification as this will enhance security on online transactions. She also claimed that over 12 trillion naira used items were posted on the site in the previous year and that OLX have over 300 million users which makes buying and selling easy on the platform.

Masha is the co-founder of Babban Gona farmers services limited. She serves as the executive director for corporate services.
