= Yamaha CT2 =

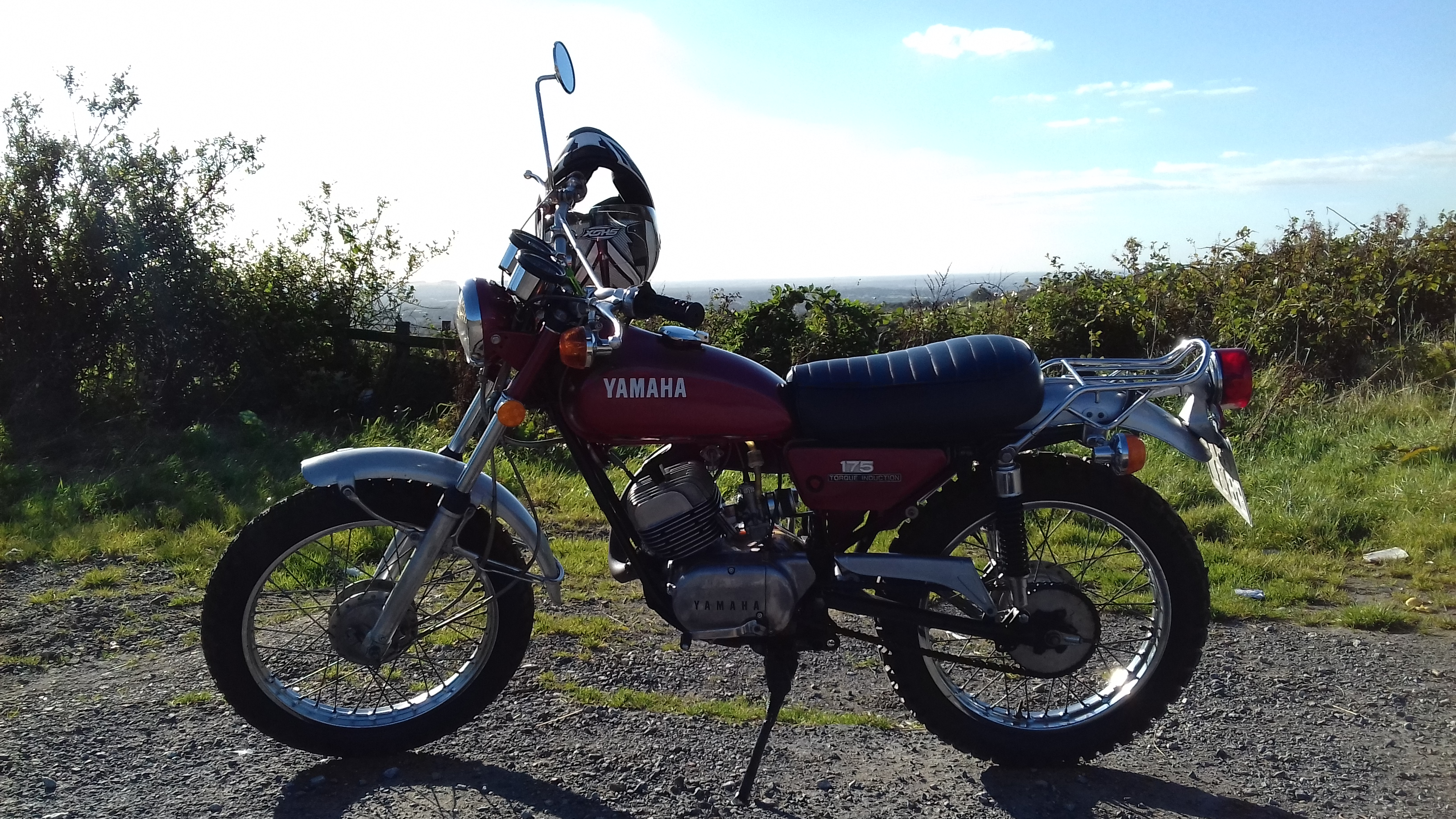
Yamaha CT2

The Yamaha CT2 was a popular 175cc Trail/Enduro motorcycle. The CT2 followed on from the CT1C, and was superseded by the CT3. There are only minor differences between each version.

The CT series was replaced with the DT175 from 1974 onwards, it was a very popular bike for its modifications.

The CT3 was the basis for the original Yamaha AG175 released in 1974, and many parts are interchangeable between the two (and earlier CT variants).

Yamaha CT series timeline:

- CT1A - 1969
- CT1B - 1970
- CT1C - 1971
- CT2 - 1972
- CT3 - 1973
