= Debbie Aung Din Taylor =

Social entrepreneur and nonprofit leader

- Born: Debbie Aung Din
- Education: Harvard University (MA in Public Policy and Development Economics), Middlebury College
- Occupations: Social entrepreneur, co-founder of Proximity Designs
- Awards: Rainer Arnhold Fellow (2007), Schwab Foundation Social Entrepreneur of the Year Award (2012), Skoll Award for Social Entrepreneurship (2012), Curry Stone Design Prize for Social Good (2013)

Debbie Aung Din Taylor is a social entrepreneur and the co-founder of Proximity Designs, a non-profit social business operating in Myanmar that sells low-cost agricultural products to help increase the income of farmer families living in poverty. Since its inception in 2004, Proximity has helped over four million people in Myanmar grow their farm enterprises.

== Education and early life ==
Debbie Aung Din holds a Bachelor of Arts from Middlebury College and a Master of Arts in Public Policy and Development Economics from Harvard University. In 1978, she met Jim Taylor while working on rural health clinics and urban revitalization in the Mississippi Delta. The couple married and moved to Cambodia in 1985, working as country directors for the Mennonite Central Committee. They later worked as economic policy advisers in Indonesia for seven years.

== Career ==
Taylor has worked in design and economic research in Myanmar since 1995. She has worked for NGOs, USAID, the United Nations (including the UNDP), and the World Bank. From 2004 to 2008, she served as the country director for Myanmar for International Development Enterprises (iDE) Myanmar.

=== Proximity Designs ===
In 2004, Debbie Aung Din Taylor and her husband Jim Taylor moved to Myanmar and founded the Myanmar outpost of iDE, which later evolved into Proximity Designs in 2008. Operating out of Yangon, Proximity Designs is a social enterprise focused on the small farm sector. The organization aims to help poor farmer families increase their income by providing them with affordable irrigation technologies, agricultural advisory services, climate-smart agronomy services, and farm finance products.

An early product was a low-cost, foot-powered water pump. By manufacturing the pumps locally, the organization was able to reduce the cost to as low as $12, reportedly providing farmers an average of $200 in additional crop profit per season.

As of 2022, Proximity has served farmers in over 10,000 villages and enabled over four million people in rural Myanmar to grow their farm enterprises.

==== Disaster relief and cyclone Nargis ====
In May 2008, Cyclone Nargis killed over 150,000 people, affected two million people, and devastated rural Myanmar. Proximity Designs (then operating as iDE Myanmar) became a primary disaster-relief actor. Despite not being a traditional relief agency, the organization mobilized to deliver supplies directly to survivors. Leveraging their existing village-level distribution networks and relationships with rural communities, they coordinated relief efforts in the storm's aftermath. During the relief operation, the organization reached more than one million people, distributed more than 73,000 temporary family shelters, delivered 58,000 farm recovery kits in time for the late-July planting deadline, provided 4,200 large-capacity water storage tanks, and supplied one month’s worth of rice to 110,000 landless families.

== Awards and honors ==
- Rainer Arnhold Fellow (2007)
- Skoll Award for Social Entrepreneurship (2012)
- Schwab Social Entrepreneur of the Year Award (2012)
- Curry Stone Design Prize for Social Good (2013)
