= Quratulain Bakhteari =

Pakistani social entrepreneur and community organizer born 1949

- Born: December 25, 1949 (age 76)
- Occupation: Social Entrepreneur
- Organization(s): Institute for Development Studies and Practices
- Known for: community worker

Quratulain Bakhteari is a Pakistani social entrepreneur and community organizer known for founding the Institute for Development Studies and Practices.

== Early life and education ==
Quratulain Bakhteari was born on December 25, 1949, in a refugee settlement outside Karachi, Pakistan. She attended St. Agnes primary school, went to the PECHS high school for girls, and then St. Joseph's for high school. She spent the first 22 years of her life in this camp, marrying a dentist at 16. She went on to attend the University of Karachi, where she received her master's degree in Social Work. She completed her PhD in Community Development at Loughborough University in the UK in 1987.

== Professional life ==
Bakhteari began her work in Orangi, a shantytown in northern Karachi, in 1971. From 1978 to 1982, while completing her undergraduate degree, Dr. Bakhteari continued working in the settlements around Karachi as a volunteer, researcher, and community organizer, with a focus on public health and sanitation. During this time she helped many newly arrived refugees from Eastern Pakistan, now Bangladesh, providing health care and education access. Bakhteari was deeply involved with sewage and sanitation issues in Orangi, including working for many years with the Orangi Pilot Project. Bakhteari has attributed her choice of profession to her experiences growing up as a refugee.

Bakhteari was then invited by the provincial government of Baluchistan (Pakistan) to bring the Orangi Pilot Project model to Quetta. Bakhteari became connected to Quetta, and in the 1980s, was asked to work on providing education for girls in Baluchistan. She created and led the concept of the Community Support Process to provide girls education, establishing 2200 community-supported schools for girls, with an enrollment of 300,000 girls in a 5-year span.

Bakhteari serves on the board of HomeNet South Asia.

=== Institute for Development Studies and Practices ===
In 1998, continuing her work in education, Dr. Quratulain Bakhteari founded the Institute for Development and Practices (IDSP), a local education model designed to operate locally and independent of government or academic sponsorship. This school would provide a basic education as well as teach students about community development, organization, and cooperation. The institute opens up Learning Spaces across Pakistan that provide training for young people from underprivileged backgrounds to go on and serve their communities. Currently the school is non-formal and non-degree awarding, however IDSP is working toward establishing a university based on the same ideas, developing a curriculum and campus in Quetta.

== Honors, decorations, awards and distinctions ==
Dr. Bakhteari was nominated for the Nobel Peace Prize in 2006. She also won the Skoll Award for Social Entrepreneurship in 2006 for her work with IDSP. She is an Ashoka Fellow. Bakhteari was honored by the 2017 Pakistan Women Festival as the winner of the Reduced Inequalities category.

== Publications, talks and interviews ==
Bakhteari spoke at TEDxKarachi in 2011. She was the commencement speaker at the Indus Valley School university convocation in 2015. Bakhteari also spoke at the Global Philanthropy Forum in 2007.

== See also ==
- Women's education in Pakistan
