= Glasswing International =

El Salvador nonporofit organization

- Formation: June 2007
- Founder: Celina de Sola, Diego de Sola, Ken Baker
- Founded at: San Salvador
- Type: Non-profit organization
- Location(s): El Salvador and New York
- Region served: New York City, Latin America, Caribbean
- Key people: Celina de Sola, Diego de Sola, Ken Baker
- Website: www.glasswing.org

Glasswing International is an international non-profit, non-governmental organization (NGO) founded in 2007 in San Salvador, El Salvador, by Celina de Sola, Diego de Sola, and Ken Baker. Glasswing operates education, health, and community development programs for children throughout Latin America and New York City.

== History ==
In 2007, Celina de Sola, a Salvadoran humanitarian worker and public health specialist, co-founded Glasswing International with her brother Diego and husband Ken Baker. Its mission is to curb the impact of poverty and violence in Latin America through public education, public health, and community development.

Glasswing is headquartered in San Salvador and New York City with offices in Colombia, Costa Rica, Dominican Republic, Guatemala, Honduras, Mexico, and Panama.

== Overview ==
Glasswing works with communities to address the root causes and consequences of violence and poverty. Its partners in the public and private sectors include Starbucks, Samsung, and Hanesbrands.

A 2016 study by the Pontifical Catholic University of Chile found that students enrolled in Glasswing's community schools showed improved academic performance, positive behavior changes, and increased emotional resilience, and they felt they had a better school environment.
