= Harambee Youth Employment Accelerator =

South African nonprofit

- Formation: 2011
- Founder: Nicola Galombik
- Location: South Africa
- CEO: Kasthuri Soni
- Key people: Maryana Iskander
- Website: harambee.co.za

Harambee Youth Employment Accelerator is a South African nonprofit founded to address the youth unemployment crisis by connecting employers to first-time job seekers.

== About ==
Harambee Youth Employment Accelerator is a not-for-profit social enterprise that works with partners to find solutions for the challenge of youth unemployment. Their partners who, like them, are committed to results that can work at scale – include government, the private sector, civil society, and over 4 million youth. They are working to unlock jobs and break down the barriers that keep millions of young South Africans unemployed. Their vision is of a growing economy and a society that works, powered by the potential of young people.

Harambee is an partner in a platform called SA Youth which brings together many partners to create a single national network to allow young people to access a wide selection of jobs and skilling opportunities, and for opportunity holders to access young work-seekers.

=== Recognition ===
Harambee has been the recipient of a number of grants and awards, including the Skoll Award for Social Entrepreneurship, a finalist for the 2019 Conscious Companies award and the Global Center for Youth Employment award. It was one of the Aspen Institute's 2015 John P. McNulty prize laureates and also received recognition from USAID and a $3.5 million grant in 2020. In 2019, they were voted the 8th most popular brand in South Africa in the "Coolest Campaign Targeted at Youth 2019" category.

== History ==
Harambee was founded in 2011 by Nicola Galombik, who is also the Executive Director at Yellowwoods, a global investment group based in South Africa. The name "Harambee" is Swahili for "we all pull together". The organization was incubated by Yellowwoods in partnership with the South African Government's National Treasury's Jobs Fund. Maryana Iskander took over as Chief Executive Officer in 2012. According to Iskander, their initial goal was to "scale and place 10,000 people into their first jobs". In 2015, Harambee made an on-stage commitment at the Clinton Global Initiative to provide unemployed youth in South Africa access to 50,000 jobs and work experiences. As of June 2019, Harambee had connected 100,000 young South Africans to employment.
