= VillageReach =

US-based non-profit organization

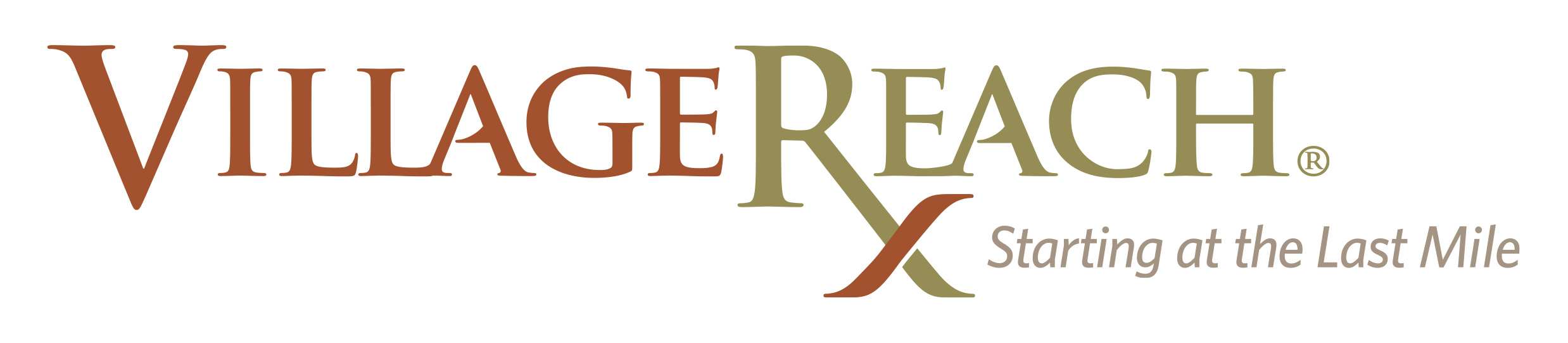
- Founded: 2000
- Founder: Blaise Judja-Sato
- Type: Medical logistics, developing world health United States IRS exemption status: 501(c)(3)
- Location: Seattle, United States
- Region served: Mozambique, Malawi (primary), also operations in Benin, Democratic Republic of Congo. Nigeria, Senegal, South Africa, Tanzania, Zambia
- Website: www.villagereach.org

VillageReach is a registered 501(c)(3) that works with governments to solve health care delivery challenges in low-resource communities. Its headquarters are in Seattle, Washington, with international offices in Mozambique, Malawi, and the Democratic Republic of the Congo, Africa. The VillageReach approach includes developing, testing, implementing and scaling new systems, technologies and programs that improve health outcomes. This is achieved by extending the reach and enhancing the quality of health care. The benefits are manifested through supply chain and logistics improvements, information and communication technology, human resources for health, private sector engagement and advocacy.

== History ==
VillageReach was established after Blaise Judja-Sato, a telecommunications executive born in Cameroon, heard about a flood in Mozambique. The 1999 flood had caused the displacement of 500,000 people and severely damaged housing, infrastructure, and water and energy supply systems. Blaise was based in the United States in 1999 when the flood occurred, but he returned to Africa to aid in disaster relief. Judja-Sato raised $1.5 million for relief efforts in Mozambique and worked in collaboration with Graça Machel’s community foundation. The disruptions in Mozambique’s health system became increasingly obvious while aid efforts took place, especially in remote and rural populations, leading Judja-Sato to establish VillageReach to help those at the "last mile". VillageReach began its activities in Mozambique in 2001.

== Funding ==
VillageReach funding comes from a combination of government and multi-lateral funders. Funders include USAID, UNICEF, the Bill and Melinda Gates Foundation, the Skoll Foundation, the Mulago Foundation, and Vitol Foundation.

== Effectiveness ==
Charity evaluator GiveWell recommended Village Reach as a top charity, as assessed by impact, from 2009 to 2011 but then considered the charity to have limited room for extra funding and removed the charity from GiveWell's list of top-rated charities.

== Awards ==
VillageReach and VillageReach employees have been recognized with several awards:

- Bvudzai Magadzire, the senior technical advisor for research and advocacy in South Africa, was selected to join the 2019 class of the Obama Foundation Leaders: Africa Program.
- WGHA announced VillageReach and Planned Parenthood of the Great Northwest and Hawaiian Islands as winners of the 2018 Pioneers of Global Health Awards for Outstanding Collaboration.
- VillageReach received an award from the Seattle Met "Light a Fire" awards for Acting Globally.
- VillageReach won DREAMS Innovation Challenge in 2016.
- Evan Simpson, former president of VillageReach, was featured as a Changemaker in GlobalWA July 2016 Newsletter.
- VillageReach President Allen Wilcox was one of the 2014 Schwab Social Entrepreneurs of the Year.
- Margarida Matsihne was awarded the 2013 Gates Foundation Vaccine Innovation Award for her contributions to vaccine delivery in Mozambique.
- Allen Wilcox was awarded Microsoft Integral Fellow Award in 2012.
- VillageReach was a 2009 Tech Awards Laureate for health.
- VillageReach was a recipient of the 2006 Skoll Award for Social Entrepreneurship.
