= Branson School of Entrepreneurship =

Charitable organization

Coordinates: 18.445965°N 77.922528°W

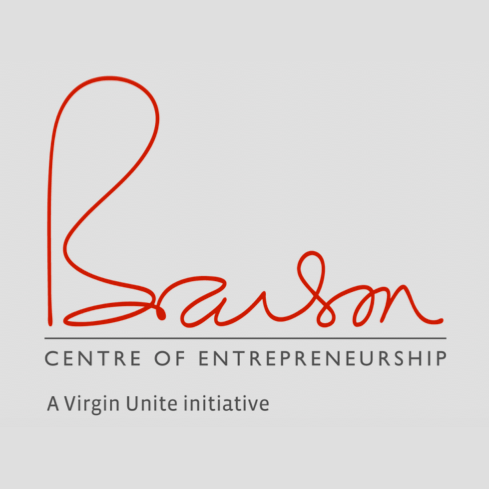
- Founded: 2006
- Founders: Richard Branson, Taddy Blecher
- Type: Educational charity
- Locations: Johannesburg, South Africa; Montego Bay, Jamaica
- Key people: Executive Director Judi Sandrock
- Affiliations: CIDA City Campus, Virgin Unite,
- Website: bransoncentre.org

The Branson School of Entrepreneurship (aka Branson Centre of Entrepreneurship) is a charitable organization that provides entrepreneurial training and financial support to international youth.

== History ==
The Branson School of Entrepreneurship (BSE) was founded in 2006 as partnership between Taddy Blecher and Richard Branson in Johannesburg, South Africa as part of the non-profit foundation, Virgin Unite. By 2009 the school had given financial mentoring and training to 4,100 students. The school's managing director was James Wanjohi and Virgin Unite was considering additional schools in the United States, Britain and Kenya at that time. In January Branson visited the school to give awards and recognition to selected students.

Beginning in 2011 the BSE became known as the Branson Centre of Entrepreneurship with Judi Sandrock as its executive director. In September, Branson opened a branch in Montego Bay, Jamaica.

== Description ==
The school's goal is to stimulate local economies by training and mentoring disadvantaged youth. As of 2006, BSE training was part of the curriculum at CIDA City Campus serving 800 youths per year. The BSE provides financial support, in the form of "seed money" loans, for the most well conceived business plans of each class.
