= Taddy Blecher =

South African actuary, management consultant and educational entrepreneur

- Born: 1967 (age 58–59); Johannesburg, South Africa
- Occupations: Actuary, management consultant, educator

Taddy Blecher (born 1967) is a South African actuary, management consultant and educational entrepreneur. He is the co-founder of CIDA City Campus and was given the World Economic Forum's Global Leader for Tomorrow Award in 2002 and again in 2005.

== Early life and education ==
Blecher was born in Johannesburg, South Africa, in 1967. At university he studied actuarial science and was given "several awards, including the Liberty Life Gold Medal for the top actuarial honours student in the country."

== Career ==
While working as an actuary and international business consultant Blecher "was voted consultant of the year three consecutive times at Monitor Company." In 1995 he received an R1, 3-million job offer in the US. However, after buying his plane ticket he had a change of heart and decided to remain in South Africa to pursue education and employment opportunities for disadvantaged youth.

In 1999, after four years of teaching the Transcendental Meditation technique to students at schools in the Alexander township, Blecher began contacting rural schools and city business' to recruit students and donations for an "almost-free business university" which he co-founded with 250 students. The school, called Community and Individual Development City Campus (or CIDA City Campus), provided a low cost educational opportunity, in an area of high poverty and low job skills, and cast Blecher as "a local hero". To get the school started, Blecher was given the use of a Johannesburg office building by an investment bank called Investec and his former employer gave him use of an office. He taught students to type 30 words per minute using a photocopy of a computer keyboard and successfully pursued donations from companies including JPMorgan and Dell computers as well as entrepreneurs Oprah Winfrey and Richard Branson. Later, Blecher was given the World Economic Forum's Global Leader for Tomorrow Award in 2002 and again in 2005. As the CIDA City campus' chief executive officer Blecher accepted a $1 million donation from the Skoll Foundation in 2007.

Blecher left CIDA "to start another free educational body, called the Maharishi Institute". In 2009 he co-founded "a 225-seat call centre and a large data-capture facility" called Invincible Outsourcing. A project designed to allow disadvantaged students to earn funds for education while they are still in school.

Blecher is a member of the Human Resource Development Council of South Africa and a co-founder of an innovation award program called InnovationTown and the Branson School of Entrepreneurship.

== Personal life ==
Blecher has been described as "a Harry Potter lookalike" with a passion for education. Blecher says he learned to meditate when he was 10 years old and practises yoga and meditation daily. In addition to providing the disadvantaged with educational opportunities Blecher wants to "help people find direction in their lives" and is "an advocate of Transcendental Meditation".

After overcoming a fear of public speaking he was described by The Star "as one of the top 100 people" in the news headlines and "An inspirational speaker whose incredible story made every major publication in South Africa."
