= Impact sourcing =

Impact sourcing, also known as socially responsible outsourcing, refers to an arm of the business process outsourcing (BPO) industry. It employs people at the base of the pyramid or socioeconomically disadvantaged individuals as principal workers in BPO centers to provide high-quality, information-based services to domestic and international clients. The traditional BPO sector is typically associated with high-end, high-contact functions like call centers, which require significant education and language literacy levels. The impact sourcing sector focuses on utilizing workers from poor and vulnerable communities to perform functions with lower and moderate skill requirements such as scanning documents, data-entry work, data verification and cleaning, video tagging, and microwork.

== The BPO sector ==
Business process outsourcing (BPO) refers to the outsourcing of certain business processes (i.e. informational and transaction services) to third-party service providers. This business has grown over the past two decades to a hundred billion-dollar sector that directly impacts both international trade and the global economy. Growth in the sector has been driven by five mega-trends:

- Global macroeconomic liberalization
- The digitization of business processes
- Technological innovations and the adoption of technology
- Growing worldwide capabilities
- Global business culture.

Growth is likely to continue; Kennedy considers that the majority of these drivers are unlikely to reverse. The global estimate for the sector was as high as $574 billion by 2015. Developing countries have particularly benefited from the growth of the BPO sector, generating exports and millions of jobs. Leading centers for BPO locations include India, the Philippines, China, Costa Rica, and South Africa.

== Origins of impact sourcing ==
Impact sourcing first evolved as a new sub-sector of the industry in India as rising costs in urban centers forced many outsourcing providers to focus on higher end services such as voice. New businesses sprang up in rural areas of India where they enjoyed both lower costs and less staff turnover. Those BPOs, such as RuralShores, employed high school graduates and university students from agrarian, low-income families.

== Support ==
In 2010, The Rockefeller Foundation launched an initiative focused on poverty reduction through employment to further its core activities related to supporting "sustainable livelihoods" among poor and vulnerable populations. The Monitor Group and The Rockefeller Foundation, borrowing from impact investing terminology, formally coined the term "impact sourcing" in a 2011 report that focused on the beneficial job creation aspect of the BPO industry.

The Global Impact Sourcing Coalition (GISC) supports employers wishing to develop more inclusive supply chains by adopting impact sourcing strategies.

== Impact sourcing service providers ==
Impact sourcing service providers ('ISSPs') are organizations within the tertiary/services sector with specific social objectives. Many of these firms, as an explicit part of their mission or objectives, aim to generate employment for and upgrade skills of workers from poor and vulnerable communities. A 2022 systematic literature review distinguished five stakeholder groups around ISSPs: the providers themselves, the workers they hire, the surrounding communities, the outsourcing clients, and government actors. Achaya notes two "promising" examples, Head Held High, based in Bengaluru (Bangalore), whose impact is focussed on young people, women and marginalised communities in rural India, and NextWealth, also based in Bengaluru, who work to sub-contract outsourcing opportunities to potential outsourcing providers.

== Value proposition ==
Impact sourcing is viewed as an effective market-based solution to poverty alleviation and shows the potential to create millions of jobs for the young and those living in poverty. While long-term studies have yet to take place, impact sourcing has begun to demonstrate positive impacts on multiple aspects of well-being for workers and their families. Studies indicate that impact sourcing employees benefit with income increases of anywhere from 40 percent to 200 percent. Employment in impact sourcing also serves as an initial entry point into the formal economy, which leads to valuable job experience that can help workers pay their way through school, receive higher education and move towards better careers.

Impact sourcing also has the potential to benefit traditional BPO service providers, who are actively seeking alternate lower-cost destinations (i.e. smaller cities and/or rural towns) and pools of new and more affordable qualified workers.

While the potential benefits of impact sourcing are compelling, the sector faces challenges that have prevented it from reaching its full potential. These obstacles include the ability of ISSPs to secure new work and clients, as well as the ability for ISSPs to partner with and sub-contract for larger, more traditional BPO service providers.

== Market size ==
Impact sourcing is considered to be in its early stage of development. In 2011 the current market size was estimated at $4.5 billion, which represented about 4% of the $119 billion BPO industry. Impact Sourcing directly employs approximately 144,000 people across all segments. Some analysts estimate that impact sourcing has the potential to grow to $20 billion by 2015, employing 780,000 socioeconomically disadvantaged people globally. Avasant estimated that the market had the ability to grow to represent 23% of the total BPO industry by 2020.
