= CIDA City Campus =

Location
- Johannesburg, Gauteng; South Africa
- 26.125°S 28.103°E

Information
- Type: Accredited University
- Established: 2000
- Closed: 2014
- Website: CIDA City Campus

CIDA City Campus was an accredited university, founded in 2000, located in Lyndhurst, Johannesburg. It offers three year degrees in Bachelor of Business Administration.

== Description ==
The university was an accredited Bachelor of Business Administration (BBA) degree school It was called South Africa's "first low-cost tertiary education institution." Students who qualify for the business degree program received a full scholarship including books, accommodations, transportation and tuition. According to the university, more than 1,500 students graduated with a Bachelor of Business Administration degree. CIDA City Campus serviced 800 disadvantaged students and 80% of its graduates were reported to have found full-time employment upon graduation.

== History ==
The CIDA City Campus was founded in 2000 with 250 students. The Branson School of Entrepreneurship (BSE) was created as a partnership between CIDA City Campus founder Taddy Blecher and Richard Branson and the BSE became part of the CIDA City Campus' curriculum. in Johannesburg, South Africa In 2007, after the teaching of the Transcendental Meditation technique to students concerned some of CIDA's donors, co-founder Taddy Blecher left the university to start another free educational body called the Maharishi Institute.

CIDA City Campus launched an educational program called, Mastery Academy of Construction, and began receiving financial support from the construction company Murray & Roberts, Barloworld and its Letsema Sizwe Trust in 2007.

The university suspended its first year program in 2009 to allow for a restructuring that would create a certificate for those that did not qualify for the BBA program. In June the university signed an agreement with Bournemouth University of Britain to create a school for tourism and hospitality. Using its CIDA Empowerment Fund, the university purchased a 25% ownership in Cambridge University Press. In December 2012 CIDA City Campus became financially distressed and was put under the control of a business rescue firm. In December, 2014, it was closed and deregistered.
