= Thorn (organization) =

Anti-child sexual exploitation nonprofit organization

Thorn: Digital Defenders of Children
- Formation: 2012
- Type: NGO
- Legal status: Foundation
- Purpose: addressing the role of technology in the facilitation of human trafficking and child sexual exploitation
- Location(s): 1240 Rosecrans Ave, Suite 120; Manhattan Beach, California 90266
- Region served: global
- Official language: English
- Founders: Demi Moore; Ashton Kutcher
- Executive Director: Julie Cordua
- Main organ: Board of directors
- Website: www.thorn.org
- Formerly called: DNA Foundation

Thorn: Digital Defenders of Children, previously known as DNA Foundation, is a nonprofit organization that builds technology to defend children from sexual abuse. Founded in 2012, the organization creates products and programs to empower the platforms and people who have the ability to defend children.

== History ==
DNA Foundation was founded in 2009, by film and television actors Demi Moore and Ashton Kutcher. At that time, Moore was viewing an MSNBC documentary on human trafficking and sexual slavery of children in Cambodia. While later researching some of the issues that were presented in the film, she was inspired to act when she learned that child pornography and the sexual slavery of children were taking place not only in Cambodia, but in the United States as well.

When DNA Foundation was established, the name of the organization represented the couple, along with their joint commitment to addressing human trafficking. On November 15, 2012, the name of the organization was changed following the dissolution of the founders' marriage. As of 2012, they remain with the organization as co-founders. The members of the board of directors of Thorn include Moore and Kutcher; as well as Ray Chambers, the United Nations Secretary-General's Special Envoy for Malaria; and Jim Pitkow, co-founder of Attributor.

In September 2023, Kutcher resigned from the organization after sending a letter to a judge requesting leniency in the sentencing of his former costar Danny Masterson who was convicted of two counts of rape.

In 2024, Thorn's hiring of two former Europol officials in 2022 was the subject of an investigation by the European Ombudsman for potential violations of the conflict of interest rules by Europol.

== Programming ==
Thorn works with a group of technology partners who serve the organization as members of the Technology Task Force. The goal of the program includes developing technological barriers and initiatives to ensure the safety of children online and deter sexual predators on the Internet. Various corporate members of the task force include Facebook, Google, Irdeto, Microsoft, Mozilla, Palantir, Salesforce Foundation, Symantec, and Twitter.

Following the organizational change in November 2012, Kutcher and Moore made the following statement regarding the overall focus on technology:

For the past three years we have focused our work broadly on combating child sex trafficking. It has become crystal clear in our efforts that technology plays an increasingly large role in this crime and in the sexual exploitation of children overall. We believe that the technology-driven aspect of these crimes demands its own attention and investment.

As of July 2013, Thorn is in talks with leading internet companies (Facebook, Microsoft, Google, Twitter and at least three others) to collaborate on creating a database of millions of child abuse images on the web.

== Corporate partners ==
Organizations that partner with Thorn in addressing child sex slavery include Polaris Project, Girls Educational and Mentoring Services, the National Center for Missing & Exploited Children.

Thorn has partnered with the McCain Institute.

== Notable supporters ==
The following are notable individuals from the film, television, and sports industries that support the work and mission of Thorn.

- Simon Baker
- Jessica Biel
- Bradley Cooper
- Drake
- Jamie Foxx
- Kaká
- Stacy Keibler
- John Legend
- Eva Longoria
- Ludacris
- Jason Mraz
- Sean Penn
- Adrian Peterson
- Zachary Quinto
- David Spade
- Ben Stiller
- Justin Timberlake
- Mila Kunis
- Sofia Vergara

== Criticism ==
Netzpolitik.org and the investigative platform Follow the Money criticize that "Thorn has blurred the line between advocacy for children’s rights and its own interest as a vendor of scanning software." The possible conflict of interest has also been picked up by Balkan Insight, Le Monde, and El Diario. A documentary by the German public-service broadcaster ZDF criticizes how Thorn has influenced European Union lawmakers on Chat Control, a proposed law that would financially benefit the organization. A move of a former member of Europol to Thorn has been found to be maladministration by the European Ombudsman Emily O'Reilly.
