= Soraya Salti =

Jordanian and American

Soraya Salti (c.1971–2015) was a Jordanian national and an American citizen social entrepreneur and educational innovator, who served as the Senior Vice President of Middle East/North Africa for Junior Achievement Worldwide, and founded its regional office,INJAZ Al-Arab.

== Life ==
Soraya Salti held a Bachelors in Economics and Accounting and an MBA from Northwestern University. She worked to apply Michael Porter's model of economic development to Jordan before joining INJAZ, where she helped INJAZ expand into 13 Arab countries, reaching over 100,000 young people.

In 2006 she won the Schwab Social Entrepreneur of the Year for Jordan. Soraya was also a Young Global Leader of the World Economic Forum.

== Family ==
Soraya is the daughter of Amer and Rebecca Salti. Rebecca became famous for her outreach work in Jordan in 1985 when as a director for Save the Children in Jordan she launched the Bani Hamida Weaving Project. The project became a model income-generation project throughout the developing world and is internationally known. It continues today with the participation of three generations of rural Bedouin women of the Bani Hamida Tribe.

== Death ==
On November 6, 2015, the bodies of her and her sister, Jumana Salti, were found together at the base of a building under construction in Amman. Police suggested their deaths were suicide, but the suggestion was rejected by friends and relatives, prompting allegations that the pair had been murdered. Soraya is survived by her daughter, Raya.
