= Telapak =

Telapak is a non-profit organisation involved in reporting on illegal logging in Indonesia’s national parks to raise awareness of the issue, both internationally and domestically.
