= International Bridges to Justice =

International Bridges to Justice (IBJ) is a non-governmental organization based in Geneva. The organization's stated mission is "to protect the basic legal rights of ordinary citizens in developing countries by guaranteeing all citizens the right to competent legal representation, the right to be protected from cruel and unusual punishment, and the right to a fair trial". IBJ has the additional stated goal "to end torture in this Century".

== Creation ==
IBJ was founded in 2000 by former public defender Karen I. Tse in response to her time spent working as a Fellow for refugees in Southeast Asia in the 1980s and then as a trainer for a group of public defenders in Cambodia in 1994. After witnessing numerous violations of citizens' legal rights, Tse enrolled at the Harvard Divinity School in 1997, where she began devising the business plan for International Bridges to Justice.

== Principles ==
IBJ states that it only works in countries whose international treaty obligations and national laws have already laid the legal framework for the protection of their citizens and where a Memorandum of Understanding has been signed with the relevant government and legal authorities, setting out the parameters under which IBJ will work.

== Method ==
IBJ aims to use three methods:

- Providing technical support and training to criminal defense lawyers
- Organizing justice sector roundtable sessions to bring together all of the key stakeholders in the criminal justice system, including defenders, prosecutors, judges, police, detention center officials, local government representatives and legal academics
- Raising rights awareness amongst the populations in the countries where the organization is active

== Programs ==
As of 2025, IBJ had a permanent presence in 12 countries and a temporary presence in 36 others.

Criminal defense trainings and workshops

IBJ's main method of furthering its aim of criminal justice reform is through training public defenders, or legal aid lawyers, in countries throughout the developing world. IBJ has developed a range of interactive criminal defense trainings, which include international best practices, specific hypothetical situations and country-specific legal informational and case studies.

IBJ Fellows

IBJ recruits emerging lawyers in the field of human rights to work in Defender Resource Centers in their respective countries, which serve as the basic infrastructure for programming, as well as the support and resource hub for local defenders and neutral meeting ground for dialogue between judicial stakeholders. IBJ provides training and support to the Fellows, who go on to head the IBJ Country Programs and to provide legal aid to the local population.

JusticeMakers

JusticeMakers is an online community created by IBJ to share information and best practice models in different criminal justice systems. Community members are members of the global criminal defense community. The JusticeMakers program hosts an annual criminal justice innovation competition that awards project funding to grassroots legal rights projects in communities around the world.

Legal Training Resource Center

The IBJ Legal Training Resource Center is aimed at increasing public defender capacity worldwide through the creation of on-demand web-based eLearning courses.

The Criminal Defense Wiki

The Criminal Defense Wiki is an IBJ project that allows law students, professors, and experienced criminal defense practitioners from around the world to create an internet resource for criminal defense lawyers.
