= Proximity Designs =

Proximity Designs is a not-for-profit social enterprise working to help reduce poverty for rural families in Myanmar (Burma). They design and market products and services that low-income farmers purchase and use to help increase their incomes. The organisation sells foot-powered irrigation pumps, water storage tanks, drip irrigation systems, solar lighting and farm advisory services. Proximity distributes its products and services through a network of private sector agro-dealers and independent village-level agents that reach approximately 80 percent of Myanmar's rural population. The products are designed to help farmers grow higher-value crops and significantly increase their annual incomes. Since starting in 2004, more than 110,000 Proximity products have been purchased by farm households in Myanmar. Following the disaster of Cyclone Nargis in 2008, the organisation became active in designing and implementing humanitarian relief and recovery efforts for entire communities. It is a 501(c)3 non-profit organisation registered in California with operations in Myanmar. As of 2022, Proximity has enabled approximately 5.6 million people in rural Myanmar to grow their farm enterprises and afford basic food, health care, and education for their families.

== Approach ==
Proximity Designs uses a design approach to improve the incomes and well-being of rural families in Myanmar. They employ professional designers, engineers and ethnographers to discover unmet needs and opportunities for new products and services. The organisation operates a local design lab in Myanmar, where its product designers create and test multiple prototypes to develop products that provide value to rural customers by increasing household productivity and incomes and are affordable for families earning $2 per day or less. Products reach villages nationwide through a distribution network of private agro-dealers and independent village agents. After-sales support and repair services are also offered to user households. Proximity conducts annual surveys to measure customer satisfaction and document farm family income improvements.

== History ==
Proximity Designs was co-founded by Jim Taylor and Debbie Aung Din, initially as a country program under International Development Enterprises (IDE) in 2004. The new entity was established as a wholly independent organisation in 2008 and renamed Proximity Designs. Mr. Taylor and Ms. Aung Din, both Harvard Kennedy School of Government graduates, were named Rainer Arnold Fellows in 2007–08 and received a 2012 Skoll Award for Social Entrepreneurship. Proximity has partnered with Stanford University’s Hasso Plattner Institute of Design’s Entrepreneurial Design for Extreme Affordability course since 2007. The organisation has over 800 full-time staff in Myanmar, with its central office in Yangon. The US office is located in Los Angeles. To date, Proximity Designs has helped 2.5 million rural people through its products, services and farm recovery efforts in the aftermath of Cyclone Nargis (2008).

== Products and services ==
Proximity Design's portfolio of products and services is marketed under the Yetagon brand in Myanmar and includes:

- Foot-operated irrigation pumps that draw water from wells, streams or ponds. Approximate capacity is 1,200 gallons per hour.
- Gravity-fed drip irrigation systems contain low-cost extruded plastic tape and small micro-tubes connected to an elevated water storage tank. A single drip system is designed to irrigate a 1/8-acre plot but can be linked to other systems to cover an acre.
- Portable water storage tanks made from plastic tarpaulin are commonly used as elevated tanks in Proximity's gravity-fed drip irrigation systems. They come in three sizes – 100, 150, and 250 gallons.
- Farm advisory services feature training in selected low-cost, simple agricultural practices that increase yields and protect farmers against losses caused by pests, diseases and overuse of pesticides.

Proximity Designs also designs and implements humanitarian village stimulus programs that build community infrastructure while offering wage employment to economically stressed villages. Since 2008, more than 1,000 village projects have been completed in the cyclone-hit Irrawaddy Delta and Myanmar's drought-prone central Dry Zone region.

Proximity Designs engages in field analysis of rural economic conditions and produces reports of findings.

== Statistics ==
Proximity has sold more than 110,000 products, with an estimated 400,000 people across rural Myanmar achieving higher incomes. The three-year increase in income for a typical irrigation pump user is 300 percent, or $600. Proximity's products help farmers increase their yearly income on average by $250.

Approximately 100,000 new customers purchase Proximity products per year.
