= Celina de Sola =

Salvadoran humanitarian worker and public health expert

- Born: November 5, 1976 (age 49); San Salvador
- Education: Bachelor of Arts, Master of Social Work, Master of Public Health (M.P.H.)
- Alma mater: University of Pennsylvania, Harvard University
- Occupation: President at Glasswing International
- Employer: Glasswing International
- Title: President
- Spouse: Ken Baker
- Website: glasswing.org/team-member/celina-de-sola/

Celina de Sola is a Salvadoran humanitarian worker and public health expert. She is the co-founder and Vice President of programs at Glasswing International, a non-profit international organization headquartered in San Salvador and New York City.

== Education ==
De Sola received a Bachelor of Arts degree and a Master of Social Work (M.S.W.) from the University of Pennsylvania. She also received a Master of Public Health (M.P.H.) from Harvard University.

== Career ==
Early in her career, de Sola worked as a consultant for organizations including the Population Council, URC, and Family Foundation Schools. She was also a crisis interventionist for Latino immigrants in the United States.

=== Glasswing International ===
In 2007, together with her brother Diego and husband Ken Baker, she co-founded Glasswing International, a non-profit organization in Latin America, the Caribbean and NYC. Its mission is to address the root causes of poverty and violence through public education, public health and community empowerment in San Salvador.

== Personal life ==
De Sola is married to Ken Baker, a co-founder of Glasswing International and has a young son. They live in San Salvador and New York City.
