= Riders for Health =

International non-profit organisation

Riders for Health is a non-governmental organization (NGO) that specialises in supplying, managing and maintaining vehicles for health-focused organisations in African countries. Motorcycles are well-suited for delivering health care in Africa, where roads are in poor condition or simply non-existent and budgets are tight.

Riders transport systems are designed specifically for health care delivery in Africa ensuring health workers are trained to ride or drive the correct vehicle and that parts and fuel are always available. Riders work with healthcare partners such as national governments as well NGOs, from the initial planning and budgeting of programmes to procurement of vehicles and training of riders/drivers to the retirement and replacement of vehicles.

Anne, The Princess Royal is the patron of this organisation.

== History ==
Riders for Health was founded by Barry and Andrea Coleman, a British husband-and-wife team, and motorcycle racer Randy Mamola. Barry worked as a correspondent and feature writer for The Guardian newspaper in Britain. Andrea was a professional motorcycle racer for five years. Randy Mamola was a US motorcycle racer, now an official FIM Grand Prix Legend.

The team went to Africa with Save the Children where they saw abandoned motorbikes that had been donated by aid organisations but had not been cared for or maintained. In 1986, with the help of Save the Children, local governments and money raised at fundraisers in England, they set up pilot programs in Uganda and Gambia, and helped acquire motorcycles, train riders and technicians and develop a systematic maintenance programme.

They built a fleet of 47 bikes in Lesotho that delivered health-care services from 1991 to 1996 without a breakdown. At the end of that period, Riders for Health expanded into Ghana, Zimbabwe and Nigeria. They have since diversified its fleet to include refrigerated trucks, minivans and ambulances and introduced a motorcycle ambulance fitted with a sidecar called the Uhuru that can be used as a mini-ambulance and double as a water pump when the bike is stationary.

Governments and aid organisations rely on Riders to ensure care reaches communities, using Riders services for the transport of samples and test results to even the most remote communities as well as community healthcare, the delivery of information and preventative measures, the running of antenatal and immunisation clinics and more.

In May 2016 the organisation announced the closure of its UK office. Riders for Health continues to run, managed by African staff in the countries where it operates. Founders Andrea Coleman and Randy Mamola have set up a separate fundraising and support organisation Two Wheels for Life that operates out of the UK.

In 2024, the organization released their impact report, detailing their operations across major African countries, according to the report, the organization managed to reach 42 million people and provide services to them.

In May 2025, the organization launched Riders Revival 2025, which was a collaboration between Riders and Two Wheels for Life on coordinating operations, and applying specifications and standards.
