= List of Ashden Award winners =

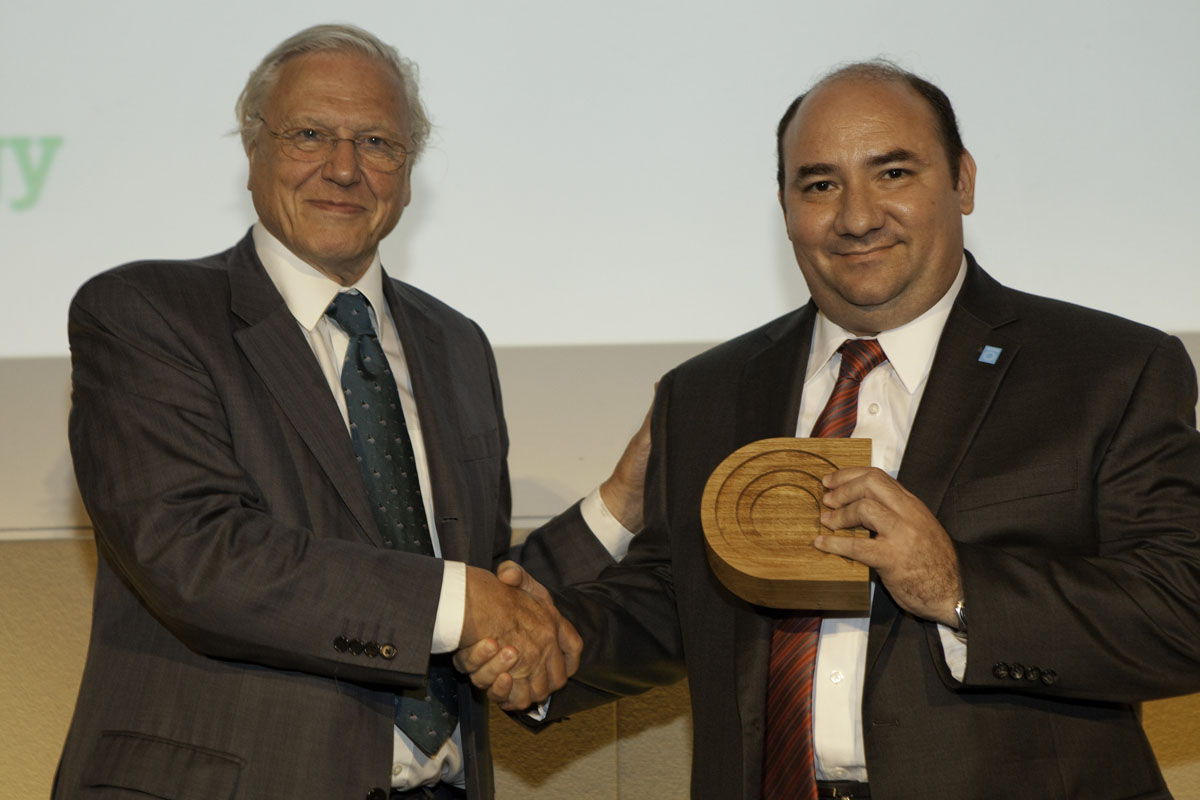
Sir David Attenborough presents the award to TECNOSOL, Nicaragua

The following is a list of the winners of the Ashden Awards, grouped by year.

Full details of their work can be found in the database on the Ashden Awards website.

== 2024 ==
Category/technology	Country/region	Organisation
Energy Innovation (UK)	UK	tepeo
Energy Innovation (Global South)	Nigeria	Salpha Energy
Powering Futures in Clean Energy	Uganda	GoGo Electric
People's Energy (UK)	UK	Energise Barnsley
Powering Refugees and Displaced People	Uganda	Patapia
Natural Climate Solutions (Global South)	Tanzania	Ujamaa Community Resource Team
Nature Based Solutions (UK)	UK	Wild Haweswater

== 2023 ==
Category/technology	Country/region	Organisation
Integrated Energy Africa	Africa	Power for All
Outstanding Achievement	Africa	HUSK Power Systems
Powering Agriculture	India	Collectives for Integrated Livelihoods Initiatives (CInI)
Powering Refugees and Displaced People	Africa	USAFI Green Energy
Energy Innovation	UK	HACT
Future Farmers	UK	FarmED
Local Nature Recoverers	UK	Enfield Council and Thames21
Natural Climate Solutions	Central Africa	CERAF-Nord
Powering Futures in Clean Energy	Africa	Burasolutions Solar Academy

== 2022 ==
Category/technology	Country/region	Organisation
Energy Access Skills	Africa	Zonful Energy
Greening All Work	UK	Vectar Sets
Energising Agriculture	Africa	SokoFresh
Energy Innovation	UK	Renewable Parts
Energising Refugee Livelihoods	Africa	Kakuma Ventures
Energy Access Skills	Africa	Energy Generation
Low Carbon Skills	UK	B4Box
Natural Climate Solutions	Asia	Alam Sehat Lestari

== 2021 ==
Category/technology	Country/region	Organisation
Natural Climate Solutions	Africa	Mbou Mon Tour
Cooling in Informal Settlements Award	India	Mahila Housing Trust
UK Climate Innovation Award	UK	Kensa Group
Humanitarian Energy Award	Africa, Global	Solar Freeze
Uk Green Skills Award	UK	Carbon Co-op
Energy Access Innovation Award	Africa	New Energy Nexus Uganda
Regenerative Agriculture Award	Africa	YICE Uganda
Energy Access Skills Award	India	Bharatiya Vikas Trust
UK Green Communities Award	UK	The Welcoming

== 2020 ==
Category/technology	Country/region	Organisation
Natural Climate Solutions	South America	Rede de Sementes do Xingu
Humanitarian Energy Award	Asia	United Nations Development Programme Yemen
System Innovation for Energy Access	Africa	Togolese Agency for Rural Electrification and Renewable Energy (AT2ER)
Financial Innovation for Energy Access	Asia	SOLShare
Energy and Livelihoods	India	S4S Technologies
Sustainable Built Environment UK	UK	Passivhaus Homes
Cool Cities	India	Natural Resources Defense Council (NRDC)
Sustainable Mobility	India	ITDP India Programme and Greater Chennai Corporation
Energy Innovation UK	UK	Guru Systems
Clean Air in UK Towns and Cities	UK	e-cargobikes.com
Sustainable Built Environment	Asia	BuildUp Nepal

== 2019 ==
Category/technology	Country/region	Organisation
Sustainable Buildings	UK	National Energy Foundation and Energiesprong UK
Sustainable Cities and Buildings	Worldwide	EQuota Energy
Ashden Award	India	Karuna Trust
Energy Innovation	UK	Highview Power
Sustainable Mobility	India	SMV Green
Powering Business	India	Resham Sutra
Clean Air	UK	London Borough of Waltham Forest
Clean Cooking	Central America	Sistema
Innovative Finance	Africa	Renewable Energy and Energy Efficiency Partnership
Cooling by Nature	Central America	Alcaldía de Medellín

== 2018 ==
Category/technology	Country/region	Organisation
Clean Air	UK	Chargemaster
Sustainable Mobility	India	Shuttl
Sustainable Buildings	Africa	MASS Design Group
Sustainable Buildings	UK	Q-Bot
Energy Innovation	UK	Upside Energy
Energy Market Distruptors	UK	Energy Local
Financial & Business Model Innovation	Worldwide	Angaza
Powering Business	India	Ecozen Solutions
Sustainable Energy and Health	India	Chhattisgarh State Renewable Energy Development Agency
Energy Access	West Africa	Lumos Global

== 2017 ==
Category/technology	Country/region	Organisation
Clean Air	UK	Big Birmingham Bikes
Clean Air	UK	Nottingham City Council
Sustainable buildings	UK	Passivhaus Trust
Smart energy	UK	Smarter Grid Solutions
Fuel poverty	UK	Switchee
Powering business	India	Ecolibrium Energy
Clean energy for women and girls	Nepal	Empower Generation
Sustainable energy and water	Kenya	Futurepump
Sustainable Travel	China	Hangzhou Bicycle Service and Transport Development Co. Ltd.
Energy access	East Africa	Mobisol
Energy access	Tajikistan	Pamir Energy
Innovative finance	West Africa	PEG Africa
Sustainable buildings	Uganda	Haileybury Youth Trust

== 2016 ==
Category/technology	Country/region	Organisation
Sustainable travel	Global	Bridges to Prosperity
Sustainable homes	UK	Cosy Homes in Lancashire (CHiL)
Clean energy for women and girls	India	Frontier Markets
Sustainable buildings	UK	Greater London Authority
Energy access	India	Greenlight Planet
Community energy	UK	Low Carbon Hub
Sustainable energy and water	Asia	Nazava Water Filters
Energy innovation	UK	Open Energi
Community energy	UK	Repowering London
Sustainable buildings	China	Shanghai Landsea Planning & Architectural Design Co. Ltd.
Innovative finance	Africa	SunFunder
Smart energy	UK	Tempus Energy

== 2015 ==
Category/technology	Country/region	Organisation
Cooking stoves	Africa	BURN Manufacturing
Energy efficiency	UK	Demand Logic
Sustainable buildings	Mexico	EcoCasa
Energy and agriculture	Costa Rica	Enertiva
Education	UK	Home Farm Primary School
Sustainable travel	France	Les Boîtes à Vélo
Education	UK	Marton Primary School
Sustainable buildings	UK	Max Fordham
Education	UK	North Warwickshire & Hinckley College
Increasing energy access	Pakistan	Sarhad Rural Support Programme
Fuel poverty	UK	Islington Council SHINE
Business innovation	Africa	SteamaCo
Sustainable travel	Belgium	Tapazz
Community energy	UK	TGV Hydro
Education	UK	Thornhill Primary School

== 2014 ==
Category/technology	Country/region	Organisation
Finance	UK	Abundance Generation
Energy efficiency	UK	Centre for Sustainable Energy
Sustainable travel	UK	Ecotricity
Behaviour change	UK	Global Action Plan
Cooking stoves	South Asia	Greenway Appliances
Buildings	UK	Hembuild (Formerly known as Hemcrete Projects)
Buildings	South Asia	Infosys
Solar photovoltaics	East Africa	Off Grid Electric
Community energy	UK	OVESCO
Water pumping	Rest of Asia	Proximity Designs
Education	UK	Sir George Monoux College
Education	UK	St Faith's School
Other biomass	Rest of Asia	Sustainable Green Fuel Enterprise
Sustainable travel	Rest of Europe	Tisséo-SMTC

== 2013 ==
Category/technology	Country/region	Organisation
Solar photovoltaics	UK and Africa	Azuri Technologies
Wind power	Cape Verde	Cabeólica
Cooking stoves	Haiti	D&E Green Enterprises
Sustainable travel	Belgium	De Lijn
Education	Derry, Northern Ireland	Hollybush Primary School
Cooking stoves	Africa and global	Impact Carbon
Buildings	High Wycombe, UK	Monodraught Ltd
Energy efficiency	Newcastle, UK	National Energy Action
Solar photovoltaics	Africa	SolarAid
Education	Hampshire, UK	South Farnborough Infant School
Buildings	UK	Sustainable Energy Academy and United House
Sustainable travel	UK	Sustrans
Multiple technologies	Cornwall, UK	Wadebridge Renewable Energy Network
Cooking stoves	Democratic Republic of the Congo	WWF-DRC

== 2012 ==
Category/technology	Country/region	Organisation
Solar lamps	Africa	Barefoot Power
Community wind energy	UK	Energy4All
Sustainable transport	Belgium	Ghent City Council
Small hydro	Afghanistan	GIZ and INTEGRATION
Small hydro	Indonesia	IBEKA
Water purification	Cambodia	iDE and Hydrologic
Carpooling	UK	Liftshare
Energy efficiency	Wales, UK	The National Trust, Wales
Energy efficiency	UK	Parity Projects
Microfinance	India	SKDRDP

== 2011 ==
Category/technology	Country/region	Organisation
Biomass briquettes	India	Abellon CleanEnergy Ltd
Energy efficiency	Pakistan	Aga Khan Planning and Building Services
Biomass gasification	India	Husk Power Systems
Energy efficiency	Ghana	Toyola Energy Ltd.
Solar PV	UK/Africa	ToughStuff International
Wood-fuel	UK	Forest Fuels (Midlands Wood Fuel)
Education	UK	Centre for Alternative Technology (CAT)
Sustainable buildings	UK	Radian
Education	UK	Severn Wye Energy Agency
Community energy	UK	Transition Town Totnes, Transition Together

== 2010 ==
Category/technology	Country/region	Organisation
Hydro	Brazil	CRELUZ
Solar photovoltaics	India	d.light
Multiple technologies	Scotland	Isle of Eigg Heritage Trust
Biogas	Vietnam	MARD/SNV
Buildings	Manchester, UK	Northwards Housing
Education	Devon, UK	Okehampton College
Solar photovoltaics	Sub-Saharan Africa	Rural Energy Foundation (now called SolarNow)
Biogas	Kenya	Sky Link Innovators
Education	Cornwall, UK	St Columb Minor School
Other biomass	Suffolk, UK	Suffolk County Council
Solar photovoltaics	Nicaragua	TECNOSOL
Solar thermal	Belfast, UK	Willis Renewable Energy Systems

== 2009 ==
Category/technology	Country/region	Organisation
Outstanding achievement	India	IDE India
Energy Champion	USA/China	Aprovecho
Solar PV	Nicaragua	ECAMI
Solar greenhouses	India	GERES
Biomass briquettes	Uganda	Kampala Jellitone Suppliers
Biomass gasification	India	Saran Renewable Energy
Solar PV	Ethiopia	Solar Energy Foundation
Charity	UK	Sustainable Energy Academy
Charity	UK	Marches Energy Agency
Energy business	UK	Geothermal International
Energy business	UK	Archetype
Local Authority	UK	Kirklees Council
Local Authority	UK	Devon County Council
Schools	UK	Ashley Primary School
Schools	UK	Currie Community High School

== 2008 ==
Category/technology	Country/region	Organisation
Outstanding achievement	Bangladesh	Grameen Shakti
Efficient stoves	India	TIDE
Solar PV	China	Renewable Energy Development Project (REDP)
Efficient stoves	Tanzania	Kisangani Smith Group
Efficient stoves	Ethiopia	Gaia Association
Solar thermal	Uganda	Fruits of the Nile
Small hydro	Brazil	CRERAL
Solar PV	India	Aryavart Gramin bank
Charity	UK	Global Action Plan
Charity	UK	The Energy Agency, Ayrshire
Energy business	UK	Kensa
Energy business	UK	Dulas
Local Authority	UK	Leeds City Council
Local Authority	UK	Arun District Council
Schools	UK	Ringmer Community College
Schools	UK	Sandhills Primary School

== 2007 ==
Category	Country/region	Organisation
Outstanding achievement	India	SELCO
Enterprise	China	Daxu Ltd
Enterprise	Nepal	Centre for Rural Technology, Nepal
Food Security	India	BIOTECH
Food Security	India	SKG Sangha
African Award	Tanzania	Zara Solar Ltd
African Award	Ghana	Deng Ltd
Light and Power	Lao PDR	Sunlabob
Light and Power	Peru	Practical Action
Education and Welfare	Bangladesh	Shidhulai Swanirvar Sangstha
Education and Welfare	Philippines	AID Foundation
Renewable Energy	UK	Wood Energy Ltd
Renewable Energy	UK	Nottinghamshire County Council
Energy efficiency	UK	Cumbria Energy Efficiency Advice Centre
Energy efficiency	UK	ENWORKS
Energy Business	UK	Ecotricity
Energy Business	UK	Solarcentury
Schools	UK	Woodheys Primary School
Schools	UK	Seaton Primary School

== 2006 ==
Category	Country/region	Organisation
Food	India	VK-Nardep
Food	India	Appropriate Rural Technology Institute (ARTI)
Food	Cambodia	Groupe Energies Renouvelables, Environnement et Solidarités (GERES)
Enterprise	India	International Development Enterprises, India (IDEI)
Light	Bangladesh	Rahimafrooz Batteries Ltd
Light	Bangladesh	Grameen Shakti
Light	Sri Lanka	SEEDS
Health and Welfare	China	Shaanxi Mothers
Health and Welfare	Mexico	Grupo Interdisciplinario de Tecnología Rural Apropiada (GIRA)
Special Africa Award	Tanzania	Mwanza Rural Housing Programme (MRHP)
Special Africa Award	Southern Africa	Aprovecho Research Centre
Renewable Electricity	UK	Good Energy
Renewable Electricity	UK	Kirklees Metropolitan Borough Council (MBC)
Renewable Heat	UK	Barnsley Metropolitan Borough Council (MBC)
Renewable Heat	UK	BioRegional Development Group
Energy efficiency	UK	Gloucestershire Warm and Well
Energy efficiency	UK	Energy Audit Company (EAC)
Schools	UK	Eastchurch Primary School
Schools	UK	Cassop Primary School

== 2005 ==
Category	Country/region	Organisation
Health and Welfare	Nepal	Biogas Sector Partnership
Health and Welfare	Nigeria	KXN Nigeria Ltd
Health and Welfare	Honduras	Trees, Water & People / AHDESA
Food	India	Nishant Bioenergy Consultancy Limited
Enterprise	Bangladesh	Prokaushali Sangsad Limited (PSL)
Enterprise	Rwanda	Kigali Institute of Science, Technology and Management (KIST)
Enterprise	India	SELCO India
Light	India	Noble Energy Solar Technologies (NEST) Ltd
Light	Philippines	Save the Ifugao Terraces Movement (SITMO)
Energy Champions	UK	ALIEnergy
Energy Champions	UK	Centre for Sustainable Energy
Energy Efficiency	UK	Community Energy Plus
Energy Efficiency	UK	Second Nature
Renewable Electricity	UK	Renewable Devices Swift Turbines
Renewable Electricity	UK	South Somerset Hydropower Group
Renewable Heat	UK	Thames Valley Bioenergy

== 2004 ==
Category	Country/region	Organisation
Enterprise	Pakistan	Aga Khan Rural Support Programme (AKRSP)
Enterprise	India	Aurore
Enterprise	India	IT Power (ITPI)
Food	Pakistan	Escorts Foundation
Food	Guatemala	HELPS International
Food	India	Prakratik Society
Light	Kenya	Intermediate Technology Development Group Kenya (ITDG-EA)
Renewable Electricity	UK	Miles and Gail Fursdon
Renewable Heat	UK	Rural Energy Trust (RET)

== 2003 ==
Category	Country/region	Organisation
Health and Welfare	Peru	Asociacion Madrilena de Ingenieria Sin Fronteras
Health and Welfare	India	Barefoot College
Food	Eritrea	Energy Research and Training Centre (ERTC)
Food	Nicaragua	Prolena Nicaragua
Enterprise	India	Madhya Pradesh Gramin Vikas Mandal
Enterprise	India	West Bengal Renewable Energy Development Agency (WBREDA)
Energy Efficiency	UK	BioRegional Development Group
Renewable Electricity	UK	Cwmni Gwynt Teg cooperative
Renewable Electricity	UK	Sustainable Energy Action Ltd

== 2002 ==
Category	Country/region	Organisation
Health and Welfare	Tanzania	Adventures in Health, Education and Agricultural Development (AHEAD)
Health and Welfare	Zambia	African College for Community Based Natural Resource Management
Food	India	Appropriate Rural Technology Institute (ARTI)
Food	Kenya	Solar Cookers International

== 2001 ==
Category	Country/region	Organisation
Food	Nigeria	Centre for Household Energy and the Environment (CEHEEN)
Food	Rwanda	Kigali Institute of Science, Technology and Management (KIST)
Health and Welfare	Honduras	Enersol Associates, Inc.
Education	Kenya	Renewable Energy Technology Assistance Programme (RETAP)

== See also ==
- Renewable energy
- Energy Globe Awards
