= E+Co =

- Founded: 1994
- Founder: Phil LaRocco, Christine Eibs Singer
- Purpose: Clean energy, Poverty alleviation, Climate change
- Location: Bloomfield, New Jersey, United States
- Region served: Africa, Asia, Central America

E+Co is a non-governmental organization based in Bloomfield, New Jersey, United States, that from its founding in 1994 to its restructuring in 2012 made over 250 clean energy investments in developing countries. Over these 18 years, E+Co maintained field offices in San Jose, Costa Rica, Bangkok, Thailand, Dar es Salaam, Tanzania and Accra, Ghana. The company's name is pronounced, "E and Co".

In 2012 E+Co underwent a restructuring that resulted in the creation of a new entity, Persistent Energy Partners (PEP). PEP, structured as a holding company, manages E+Co's legacy assets in Africa. E+Co's legacy assets in Latin America and Asia are managed by two private fund managers in those regions and are overseen by PEP. E+Co will exist until all of its investments are exited by these three fund managers, but beginning with its restructuring, E+Co is no longer an active impact investor and no longer manages its former assets. Under the terms of the restructuring, E+Co's former creditors agreed to exchange their debt in E+Co for ownership stakes in the fund managed by PEP. PEP is headquartered in New York City, and has field offices in Accra and Dar es Salaam.

E+Co supported energy entrepreneurs with loans, equity investments, business development services, and technical assistance in order to facilitate successful private sector solutions to the environmental and human health problems that are caused by the use of fossil fuels. The sectors and products in which E+Co invested include solar photovoltaics, improved cookstoves, small hydro, biomass, biogas, liquified petroleum gas (LPG), and solar water heaters.

== Business model ==
E+Co invested in small and growing enterprises whose core operations were to provide sustainable energy solutions to consumers at the bottom of the pyramid (BoP) in developing countries. E+Co provided debt, equity and quasi-equity to entrepreneurs who did not have access to traditional sources of capital either due to high perceived risk or restrictive loan terms. E+Co referred to its financial products as examples of patient capital, offering longer terms than were commercially available and seeking to grow businesses through multiple rounds of serial lending or investing. E+Co is widely regarded as one of the pioneers of Impact investing, and believed that investments should produce blended value and not solely financial returns.

In addition to financial products, E+Co also provided each entrepreneur-investee with technical assistance and business development support. Many of E+Co's portfolio companies were very early stage and operating in difficult markets, and thus required a great deal of assistance from their financiers. Some of these services included market research, business planning, impact analysis and enterprise operations management. These enterprise development services were a key part of E+Co's business model, because their provision generally enhanced an enterprise's performance and decreased the risk profile of the investment.

== History ==
E+Co was imagined and founded in 1994 by Philip LaRocco with initial funding from the Rockefeller Foundation. The founding team had previously worked together on a consulting project for Rockefeller Foundation that involved answering the question, "How best could scarce resources be used to help the global environment?" This research lead them to focus on climate change, energy issues in the developing world, and ultimately the concept behind E+Co, a market-based, entrepreneur-centric approach to addressing energy poverty and climate change.

E+Co opened its first international office in Costa Rica in the early stages of the organization's growth. Today it has three additional regional offices in Ghana, Tanzania, and Thailand. It also launched E+Carbon, a for-profit carbon monetization subsidiary, and E+Co Capital Latin America, a for-profit subsidiary that manages the Central American Renewable Energy and Cleaner Production Facility (CAREC).

From 2000 until 2004, E+Co implemented the Africa Rural Energy Enterprise Development program (AREED ) with the United Nations Environment Programme using over three million dollars of funding from the United Nations Foundation. E+Co's energy enterprise-centered model, which combines capacity building with investment capital, formed the basis of the AREED program which operated initially in five countries. E+Co developed resource tools (A Handbook for Energy Entrepreneurs), provided enterprise development services, and managed the investment facility.

In 2002, the Brazil Rural Energy Enterprise Development Program (B-REED), focusing on the Northeastern regions of Bahia and Alagoas, was initiated as a partnership between the United Nations Risoe Centre on Energy and E+Co. The next year, the China Rural Energy Enterprise Development program (C-REED) was launched in the Yunnan Province, also with E+Co as a key partner. Both the B-REED and C-REED programs attempted to replicate the success of the original AREED program in new markets. Each program resulted in the establishment of a permanent E+Co office.

== E+Co investments ==
By the end of 2009, E+Co had invested a total of $39.6 million in 268 companies.

One of E+Co's earliest projects was an equity investment in SELCO-India, a provider of solar photovoltaic systems for “underserved households” in Karnataka, India. The company has since installed over 100,000 solar lighting systems in the region. In addition, SELCO's director, Harish Hande, is now an E+Co board member.

Another E+Co investment is SME-RE, which sells biomass gasification systems to industrial clients in rural Cambodia that want to reduce their usage of diesel for heat and electricity generation. Biomass gasification involves the efficient combustion of dry organic matter, such as rice husks and other industrial waste to generate power. E+Co has made a series of debt investments in SME-RE since 2004.

La Esperanza is a 13.5MW run-of-river hydro project in Intibuca, Honduras. E+Co provided the project a loan in 2003 to fund its first powerhouse. La Esperanza has since expanded to supply power to over 10,000 households in the region.

Several of E+Co's portfolio companies have won Ashden Awards for sustainable energy including Tecnosol in 2010, ECAMI in 2009, Zara Solar in 2007 and SELCO-India in 2007 and 2005.

== Triple bottom line ==
E+Co employed, and the managers of its legacy assets employ, a triple bottom line approach to investing. The companies in which it invested must demonstrate positive social and environmental impacts in addition to financial returns in the business they conduct.

For example, Zara Solar, an E+Co portfolio company in Tanzania, sells solar photovoltaic systems to off-grid households. These systems substantially reduce users’ reliance on highly polluting methods of energy like wood, kerosene and diesel generators. This has positive environmental benefits including reductions in deforestation, air pollution and carbon emissions. In addition, reduced ongoing fuel costs and improved indoor air and light quality bring positive social benefits including better respiratory health, financial stability and increased time for work and study at home.

== E+Carbon ==
Structured as a wholly owned subsidiary of E+Co, E+Carbon is a social enterprise founded in 2007 to leverage carbon finance for the purpose of reducing poverty and mitigating environmental degradation. E+Carbon commercializes carbon assets arising from end-user energy technologies that abate large quantities of greenhouse gas emissions. It was one of the first companies to leverage carbon revenues to promote clean cooking technology, having successfully registered the second and third Gold Standard stove projects to be approved worldwide. One project was in Ghana and the other was in Mali. E+Carbon sells its offsets to Goldman Sachs through a multi-year alliance.

One of these projects involves Toyola Energy Limited, a company that sells energy-efficient cookstoves in Ghana. Their cookstoves reduce fuel usage, in this case charcoal, by about 40% over traditional methods of cooking. This in turn reduces carbon emissions, which are monetized and sold to Goldman Sachs.

== Awards and recognition ==
E+Co received second prize for the 2002 Energy Globe Award.

In 2008, E+Co was named the Financial Times Sustainable Investor of the Year, and received the runner-up distinction for that award in 2009.
