= Light Foot Enterprises =

- Type: Environmental Charity
- Tax ID no.: 06494228
- Location: Enterprise House, Station Street, Bishop's Castle, Shropshire, SY9 5AQ, UK
- Coordinates: 52°29′34″N 2°59′45″W,
- Origins: Household Energy Service, Light Foot Enterprises C.I.C
- Services: Energy audit, Environmental consulting activities
- Method: Popular Education
- Website: lightfootenterprises.org

Light Foot Enterprises is an environmental charity based in Bishop's Castle, Shropshire, UK. The organisation developed from a community initiative in the Welsh Marches concerned with household energy use and became known for its Household Energy Service, which used trained local volunteers to provide household energy surveys and advice.

In 2010, the Household Energy Service was one of three winners of the Big Green Challenge, a £1 million competition for community-led responses to climate change run by Nesta. Light Foot subsequently developed involvement in other community environmental and energy projects in and around Bishop’s Castle.

== History ==
The origins of Light Foot Enterprises lie in the Wasteless Society, a Bishop’s Castle-based environmental group. A 2009 study by the Centre for Sustainable Energy reported that members of the Wasteless Society had initially attempted to develop a community-owned wind turbine before turning their attention to household energy efficiency.

A pilot Household Energy Service was developed by the Wasteless Society and the Marches Energy Agency. Light Foot was subsequently established to operate the service. The service was intended to enable households to understand and reduce their energy consumption and associated carbon emissions.

Light Foot Enterprises was incorporated on 5 February 2008 as Light Foot Enterprises C.I.C., a community interest company. In October 2013 the organisation ceased using the CIC designation and was registered as a charity. It is a charitable company limited by guarantee.

== Household Energy Service ==
The Household Energy Service operated across parts of the Welsh Marches, including south-west Shropshire and neighbouring areas of Herefordshire and Wales. Trained volunteer surveyors visited homes and carried out energy and lifestyle surveys, after which households received information and recommendations intended to reduce energy consumption and carbon emissions.

The Centre for Sustainable Energy identified the Household Energy Service as an example of community action on climate change in its 2009 Best Practice Review of Community Action on Climate Change report. The study described the project’s reliance on existing community networks, volunteers and neighbour-to-neighbour recommendations as an important part of its approach.

A 2011 Carnegie United Kingdom Trust publication examining community resilience also discussed the scheme. It reported that the Household Energy Service had begun in the Marches in 2005 and described Light Foot Enterprises as the organisation running it. The report used the project as an example of community-led approaches intended to bridge the gap between awareness of issues such as energy security and practical action.

A further study commissioned by the Big Lottery Fund in 2012 included a case study entitled “Household Energy Services / Light Foot Enterprises”. It described a network of approximately 50 active volunteer surveyors and noted that, while domestic energy-audit schemes existed elsewhere, the Household Energy Service differed in its use of established community groups to recruit and train local volunteers.

== Big Green Challenge ==
Household Energy Services was selected as one of ten finalists from 355 initial applicants to Nesta’s Big Green Challenge, which sought community-led approaches capable of producing measurable reductions in carbon emissions.

The independent evaluation of the competition, undertaken by Brook Lyndhurst, described Household Energy Services as a community-based energy service operating in the Welsh Borders in which volunteer surveyors carried out home and lifestyle audits with support from a specialist back office.

In 2010, Household Energy Services was named one of three winners of the competition and received £300,000. The Guardian reported that the volunteer-run Shropshire project had carried out free energy audits in approximately 460 homes and had reduced carbon dioxide emissions from those homes by about 10% during the competition period.

The independent evaluation of the Big Green Challenge subsequently identified home-energy checks, community networks and locally based behaviour-change initiatives among the approaches demonstrated by the competition’s finalists.

== Later activities ==
Light Foot Enterprises continued to work on community environmental and energy initiatives after the Household Energy Service period.

=== Biodiversity and Going Wild in Bishop’s Castle ===
Light Foot Enterprises is the applicant organisation for Going Wild in Bishop’s Castle, a community biodiversity project. The National Lottery Heritage Fund awarded the project £237,931 in November 2023.

The project focuses on improving green spaces around Bishop’s Castle for people and wildlife. Activities reported locally have included habitat creation, swift-box installation, winter talks and a children’s outdoor programme. Going Wild is also described as an integral part of Bishop’s Castle Town Council’s Biodiversity Action Plan.

=== Climate action ===
The Bishop’s Castle Climate Action Group developed from sustainability work prompted by the 2016 Town Plan. In 2019 the group encouraged Bishop’s Castle Town Council to declare a Climate & Nature Emergency and then worked with the council on a Climate Action Plan, which was adopted in early 2020. The plan allocates actions between the council and the community group and is reviewed through quarterly audit reports. The plan and contact details for the group are hosted through Light Foot’s website and email.

=== Food resilience ===
Light Foot’s 2025 annual report identifies Food Forward as one of its activities and describes the Bishop’s Castle Community Food Resilience Strategy as part of the town’s Climate Action Plan.

Shropshire Live reported in May 2023 that Bishop’s Castle had become the first community in Shropshire to develop and adopt a bespoke local-level Community Food Resilience Strategy. The strategy is intended to strengthen resilience to food-system disruption, increase community growing capacity and food access, and support local producers and food businesses. Light Foot’s annual report also lists the Bishop’s Castle Community seed bank among Food Forward’s activities.

=== Renewable energy ===
Since 2021 Light Foot has worked with Shropshire and Telford Community Energy and Sharenergy on a community energy project for Bishop’s Castle. The original proposal combined a wind turbine with a district heat network, but the project partners later concluded that the heat-network element was not currently viable and shifted the immediate focus to the wind turbine. Planning permission for the wind turbine was granted in June 2025.

A 2026 case study prepared for Shropshire and Telford Community Energy examined a distributed air-source heat pump and wind model in which locally generated wind electricity would be matched with local demand through an Energy Club-type arrangement. The model was intended to reduce customers’ electricity costs and use some electricity-sale revenue to help fund heat-pump installations. Work on the turbine’s delivery, grid arrangements and business model remained ongoing in 2026.

The Charity Commission describes Light Foot Enterprises’ charitable purpose as promoting sustainable development for the public benefit, including providing information intended to help households and others reduce their carbon and energy use.

== See also ==
- Low Carbon Communities
- Marches Energy Agency
