= Kyoto box =

Solar cooker

The Kyoto Box is a solar cooker constructed from polypropylene with an acrylic plastic cover. The oven traps the sun's rays, creating enough heat to boil water or cook food.

== Construction and use ==
Two nested cardboard or polypropylene boxes form the oven structure. Temperatures inside the box can quickly reach 80 degrees Celsius (176 degrees Fahrenheit) on a sunny day. Temperatures could reach a maximum of 165 degrees Celsius. Bohmer claimed that the oven was capable of boiling 10 liters of water in two to three hours.

Solar cookers are being used by hundreds of thousands of people throughout the world. Solar cookers can also pasteurize or sterilize water to provide safe drinking water without using or collecting firewood. Kyoto Box is based on the original "Hot box" solar cooker, invented by De Sasseur in 1767.

== Updated design ==
After the award of the Financial Times Climate Change Challenge 2009 the design of the Kyoto Box was modified from the original cardboard to polypropylene, boosting the cooking performance. A further innovation was the use of a white reflector instead of one covered with aluminum foil or Mylar

== Inventor ==
The Norwegian inventor, Jon Bohmer of Kyoto Energy LTD., Kenya, made the first model of the Kyoto Box with his daughters then aged 10 and 5 years old. It later won the FT Climate Change Challenge award, placing first in the competition.

== See also ==
- CooKit
- Solar cooker
