= Harish Hande =

Indian social entrepreneur

Harish Hande ‌
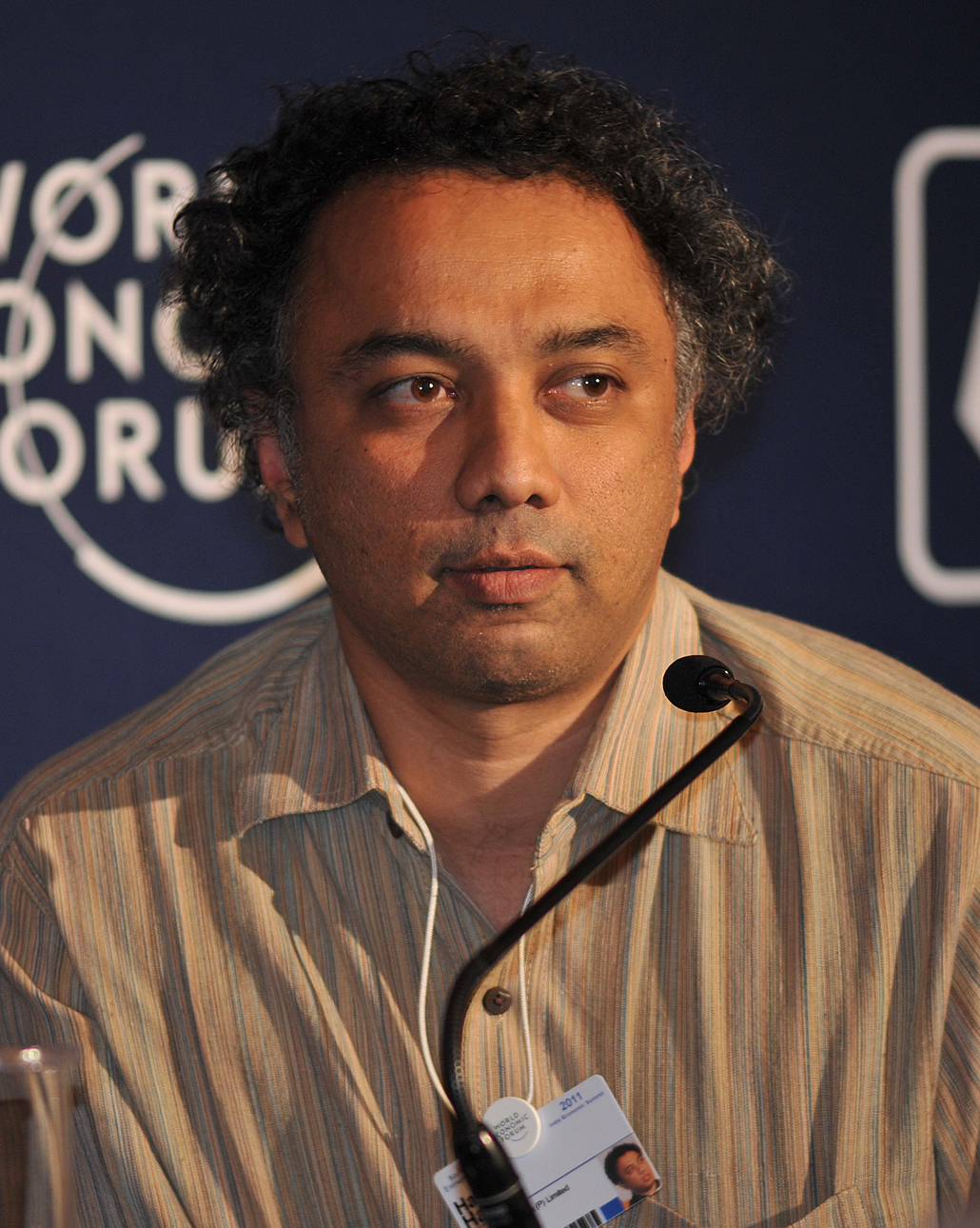
- Hande at the World Economic Forum India Economic Summit in 2011
- Born: Handattu, Udupi Taluk, Udupi District, Karnataka
- Education: IIT Kharagpur; University of Massachusetts Lowell
- Occupation: Social entrepreneur
- Awards: Ramon Magsaysay Award 2011

Harish Hande (born Handerto Harish Hande) is an Indian social entrepreneur, who co-founded SELCO India in 1995.

He was awarded with the Ramon Magsaysay Award for 2011 for "his pragmatic efforts to put solar power technology in the hands of the poor, through his social enterprise SELCO India".

== Early life ==
He was born in Handattu, Udupi District, Karnataka, and raised in Rourkela, Orissa, India.

After completing his basic schooling in Orissa in Ispat English Medium School, he went to IIT Kharagpur for his undergraduate studies in energy engineering and graduated in 1990.

He then went to the United States to do his master's degree and later PhD in energy engineering at the University of Massachusetts Lowell.

== Career ==
Hande co-founded SELCO INDIA (in 1995), a social enterprise, to eradicate poverty by promoting sustainable technologies in rural India.

SELCO India is a social enterprise that provides sustainable energy services to the poor in India. Hande left the active management of SELCO India in 2014 and became the CEO of SELCO Foundation.

== Awards and recognitions ==
SELCO India under the leadership of Hande has won the Ashden Award for Sustainable Energy 2005 and Accenture Economic Development Award for 2005.

In 2007, SELCO INDIA again won the Ashden Award, this time for "Outstanding Achievement" in energy sector. The award was presented by Al Gore, former vice president of the United States of America.

Hande was named the Social Entrepreneur of the Year 2007 by the Schwab Foundation for Social Entrepreneurship and the Nand & Jeet Khemka Foundation.

In 2008, Hande was chosen by Business Today as one of the "21 young leaders for India’s 21st century". Later, in June 2008, India Today named him one of the 50 pioneers of change in India. He was elected an Ashoka Fellow in 2008.

In 2011 he was awarded the Magsaysay Award for "his passionate and pragmatic efforts to put solar power technology in the hands of the poor, through a social enterprise that brings customized, affordable, and sustainable electricity to India’s vast rural populace, encouraging the poor to become asset creators.”.

Hande was also awarded the Karnataka Rajyotsava Prashasti in 2011 by the Government of Karnataka.

In 2013 the trustees of University of Massachusetts awarded him the Doctorate of Humane Letters.

In 2014 IIT Kharagpur conferred upon him the distinguished alumnus award.
