= Solar cooker =

Device that uses solar energy to heat food

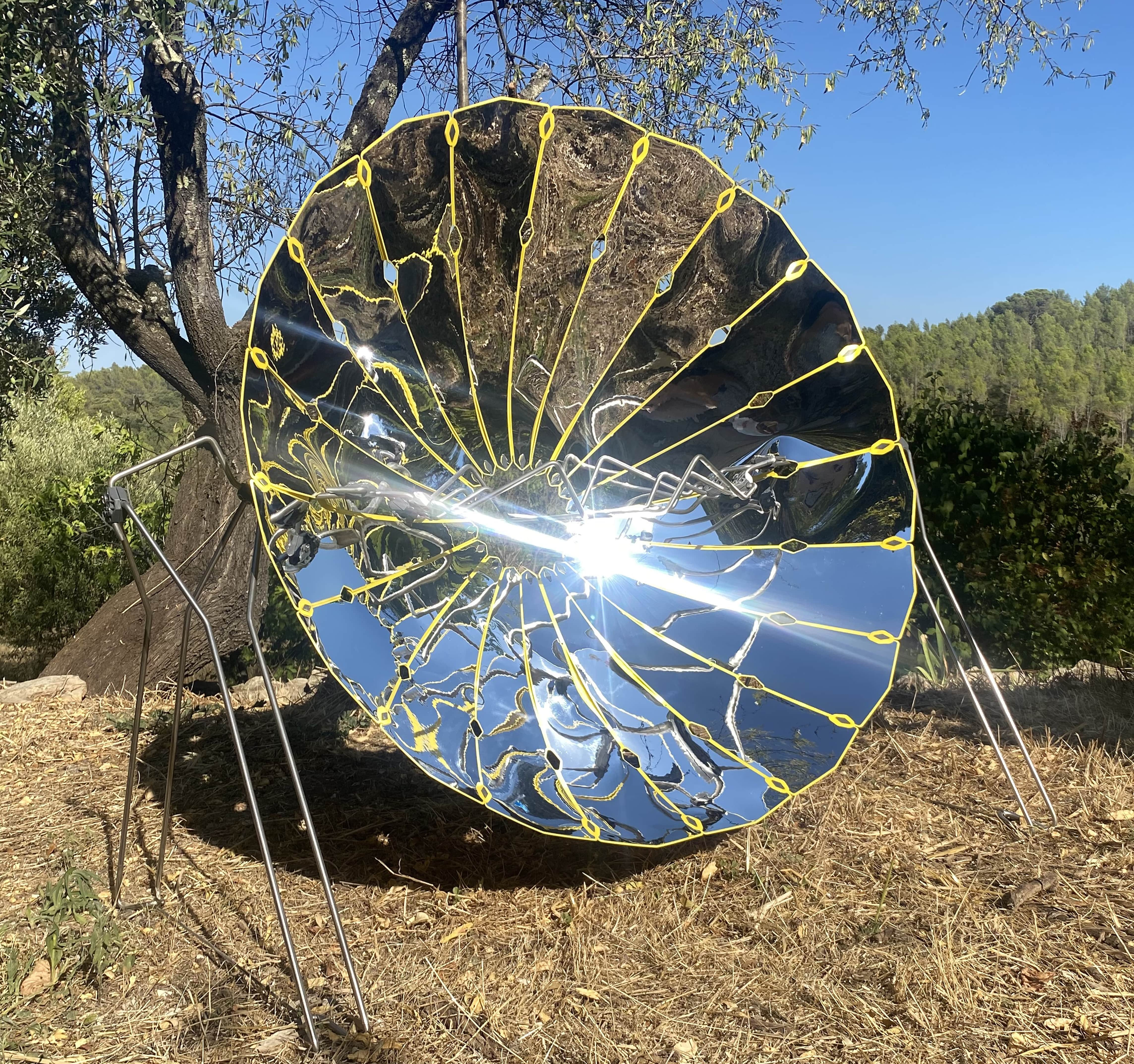
A parabolic solar cooker

A solar cooker, also known as a solar oven, is a device which uses the energy of direct sunlight to heat, cook or pasteurize food and drinks. Many solar ovens currently available are relatively inexpensive, low-tech devices, although some are as powerful or as expensive as traditional stoves, and advanced, large scale solar cookers can cook for hundreds of people. Because these cookers consume no fuel and are free to operate, many nonprofit organizations and environmental campaigns are encouraging their use worldwide in order to help reduce fuel costs, climate change and air pollution, and to help slow down deforestation and desertification.

== History ==
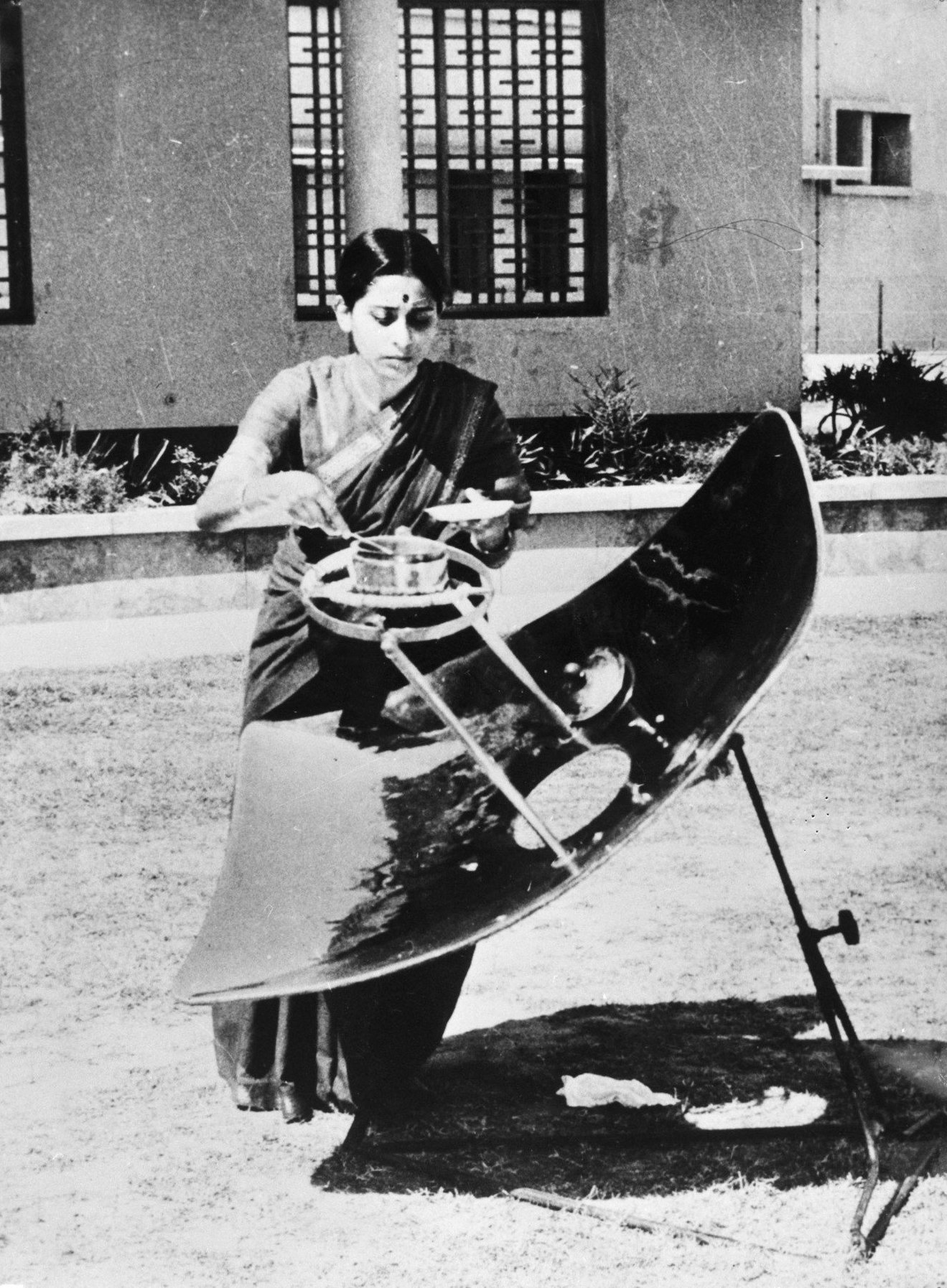
An Indian scientist demonstrating a solar cooker in 1963

In ancient times, the use of solar energy was believed to have existed in civilizations amidst the Greeks, Romans and the Chinese, though not for cooking.

The first academic description of the principles of a solar cooker is by the Genevan geologist, meteorologist, physicist, and Alpine explorer Horace-Bénédict de Saussure, in 1767. The principle of cooking meals by sunlight was largely developed in the French Foreign Legion, in the 1870s.

== Working principles ==
A mirrored surface with high specular reflection is used to concentrate light from the sun into a small cooking area. Depending on the geometry of the surface, sunlight could be concentrated by several orders of magnitude producing temperatures high enough to melt salt and metal. Such high temperatures are not really required for most household solar cooking applications. Solar cooking products are typically designed to achieve temperatures of 65 °C (150 °F) (baking temperatures) to 400 °C (750 °F) (grilling/searing temperatures) on a sunny day.

This light energy is then converted into heat energy. Solar cookers concentrate sunlight onto a receiver such as a cooking pan. The interaction between the light energy and the receiver material converts light to heat and this is called absorption. The conversion is maximized by using materials that absorb, conduct, and retain heat. Pots and pans used on solar cookers should be matte black in color to maximize absorption.

It is important to trap heat energy and reduce convection by isolating the air inside the cooker from the air outside the cooker. Simply using a glass lid on the pot enhances light absorption from the top of the pan and provides a greenhouse effect that improves heat retention and minimizes convection loss. This "glazing" transmits incoming visible sunlight but is opaque to escaping infrared thermal radiation. In resource constrained settings, a high-temperature plastic bag can serve a similar function, trapping air inside and making it possible to reach temperatures on cold and windy days similar to those possible on hot days.

== Operation ==
Different kinds of solar cookers use somewhat different methods of cooking, but most follow the same basic principles.

Food is prepared as if for an oven or stove top. However, because food cooks faster when it is in smaller pieces, food placed inside a solar cooker is usually cut into smaller pieces than it might otherwise be. For example, potatoes are usually cut into bite-sized pieces rather than roasted whole. For very simple cooking, such as melting butter or cheese, a lid may not be needed and the food may be placed on an uncovered tray or in a bowl. If several foods are to be cooked separately, then they are placed in different containers.

The container of food is placed inside the solar cooker, which may be elevated on a brick, rock, metal trivet, or other heat sink, and the solar cooker is placed in direct sunlight. Foods that cook quickly may be added to the solar cooker later. Rice for a mid-day meal might be started early in the morning, with vegetables, cheese, or soup added to the solar cooker in the middle of the morning. Depending on the size of the solar cooker and the number and quantity of cooked foods, a family may use one or more solar cookers.

A solar oven is turned towards the Sun and left until the food is cooked. Unlike cooking on a stove or over a fire, which may require more than an hour of constant supervision, food in a solar oven is generally not stirred or turned over, both because it is unnecessary and because opening the solar oven allows the trapped heat to escape and thereby slows the cooking process. If wanted, the solar oven may be checked every one to two hours, to turn the oven to face the Sun more precisely and to ensure that shadows from nearby buildings or plants have not blocked the sunlight. If the food is to be left unattended for many hours during the day, then the solar oven is often turned to face the point where the Sun will be when it appears highest in the sky, instead of towards its current position.

The cooking time depends primarily on the equipment being used, the amount of sunlight at the time, and the quantity of food that needs to be cooked. Air temperature, wind, and latitude also affect performance. Food cooks faster in the two hours before and after the local solar noon than it does in either the early morning or the late afternoon. Large quantities of food, and food in large pieces, take longer to cook. As a result, only general figures can be given for cooking time. With a small solar panel cooker, it might be possible to melt butter in 15 minutes, to bake cookies in 2 hours, and to cook rice for four people in 4 hours. With a high performing parabolic solar cooker, one may be able to grill a steak in minutes. However, depending on local conditions and the solar cooker type, these projects could take half as long, or twice as long.

It is difficult to burn food in a solar cooker. Food that has been cooked even an hour longer than necessary is usually indistinguishable from minimally cooked food. The exception to this rule is some green vegetables, which quickly change from a perfectly cooked bright green to olive drab, while still retaining the desirable texture.

Most foods cooked via solar cooker (e.g., rice) typically do not reveal their method of preparation, and most people do not see a difference merely by looking at the final product. Some foods will show characteristic differences, however, such as breads and cakes, which will brown on top instead of on the bottom; also there is the fact that, unlike food cooked over a fire, food cooked via solar cooker will not acquire a smoky flavor.

== Box and panel designs ==
A box cooker has a transparent glass or plastic top, and it may have additional reflectors to concentrate sunlight into the box. The top can usually be removed to allow dark pots containing food to be placed inside. One or more reflectors of shiny metal or foil-lined material may be positioned to bounce extra light into the interior of the oven chamber. Cooking containers and the inside bottom of the cooker should be dark-colored or black. Inside walls should be reflective to reduce radiative heat loss and bounce the light towards the pots and the dark bottom, which is in contact with the pots. The box should have insulated sides. Thermal insulation for the solar box cooker must be able to withstand temperatures up to 150 °C (300 °F) without melting or out-gassing. Crumpled newspaper, wool, rags, dry grass, sheets of cardboard, etc. can be used to insulate the walls of the cooker. Metal pots and/or bottom trays can be darkened either with flat-black spray paint (one that is non-toxic when warmed), black tempera paint, or soot from a fire. The solar box cooker typically reaches a temperature of 150 °C (300 °F). This is not as hot as a standard oven, but still hot enough to cook food over a somewhat longer period of time.

Panel solar cookers are inexpensive solar cookers that use reflective panels to direct sunlight to a cooking pot enclosed in a clear plastic bag.

Solar Oven science experiments are regularly done as projects in high schools and colleges, such as the "Solar Oven Throwdown" at the University of Arizona. These projects prove that it is possible to both achieve high temperatures, as well as predict the high temperatures using mathematical models.

HotPot panel solar cooker

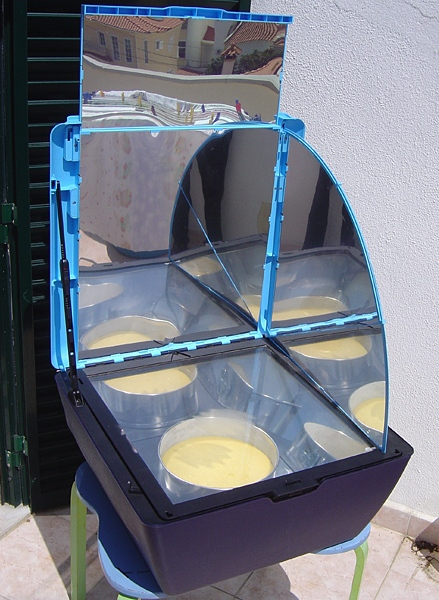
Solar oven in use

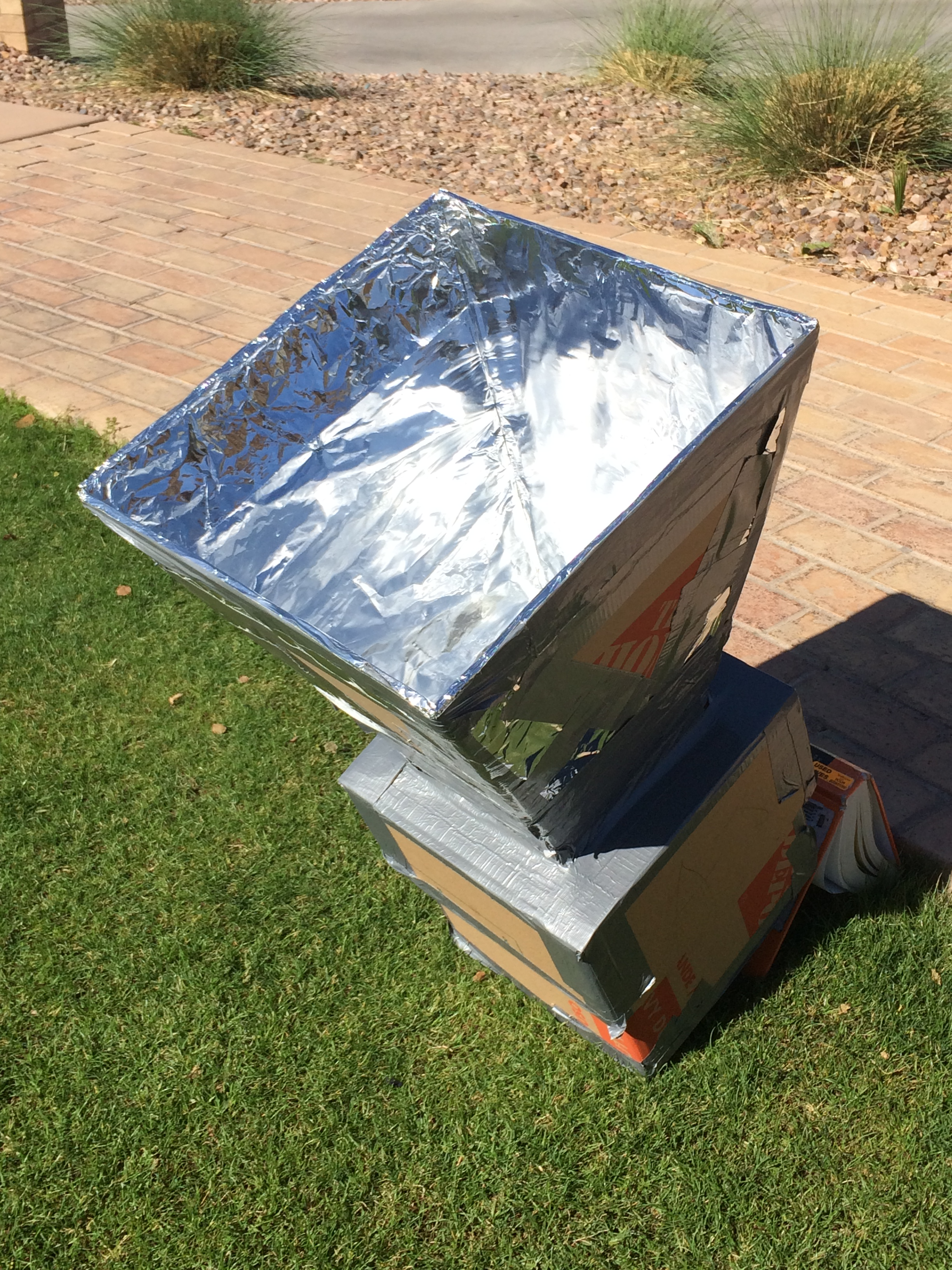
Solar Oven made of cardboard

== Parabolic or paraboloidal reflectors ==
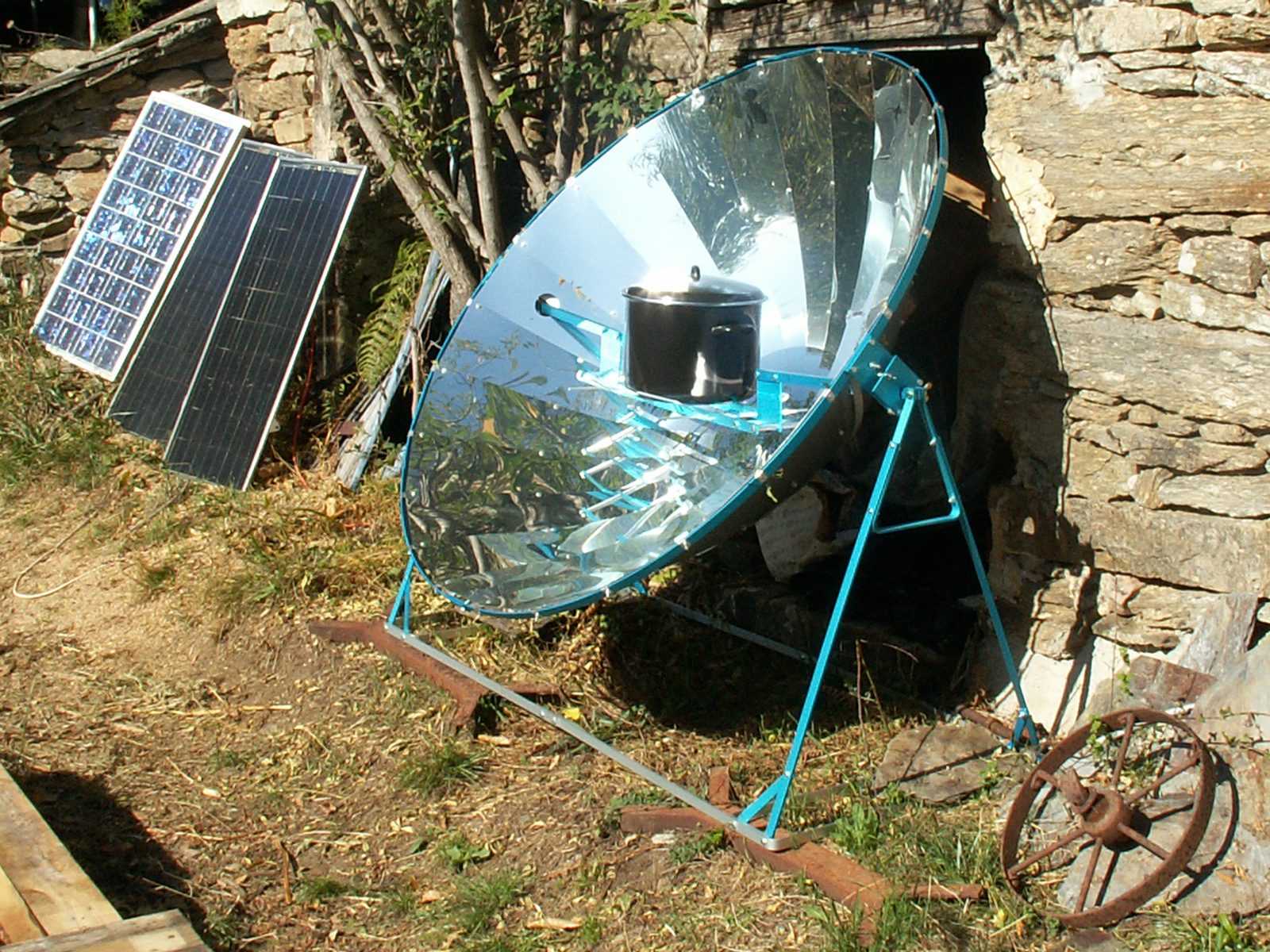
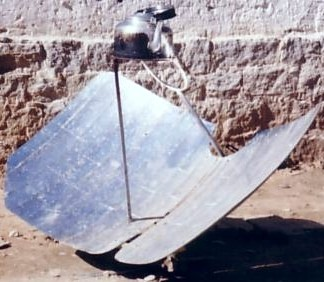
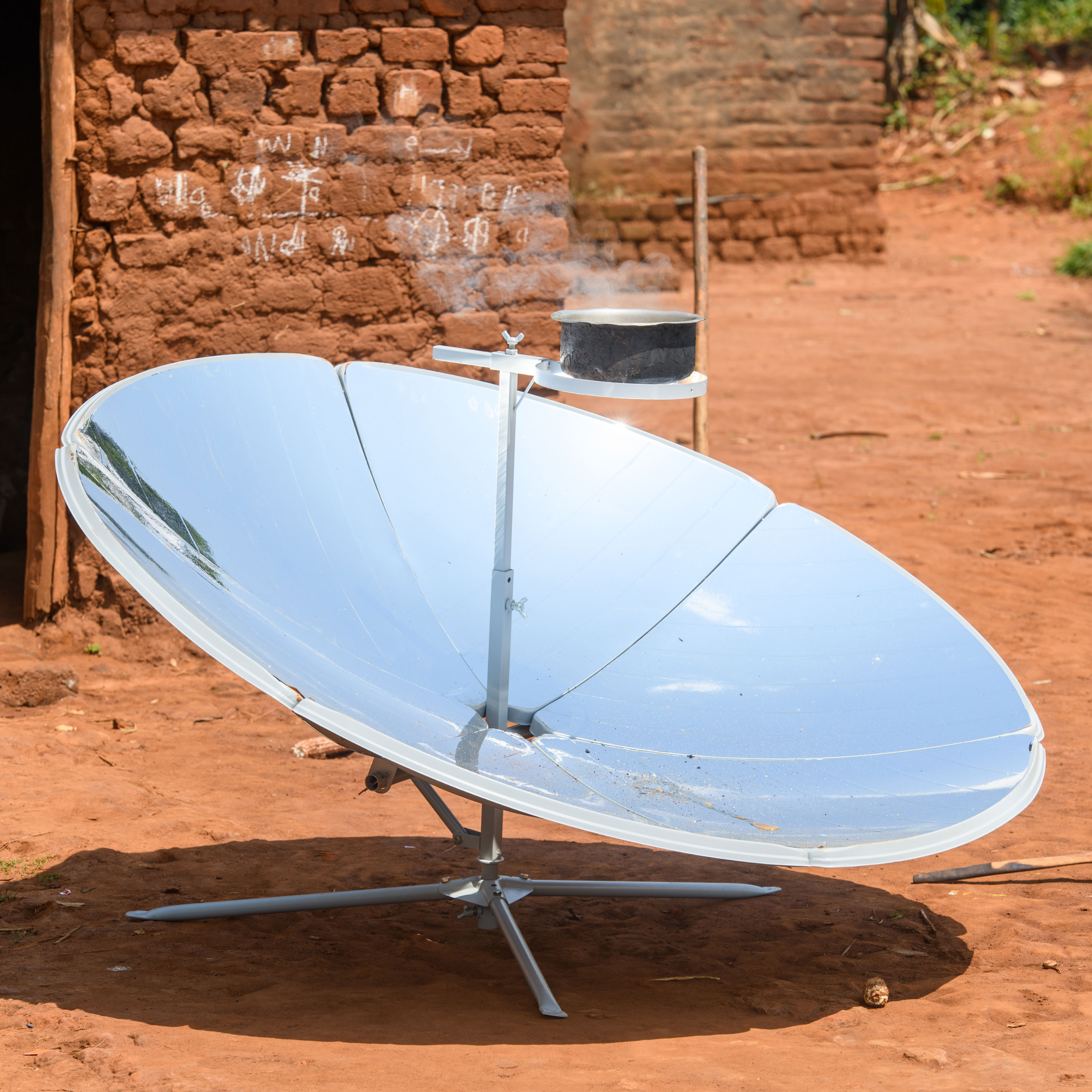
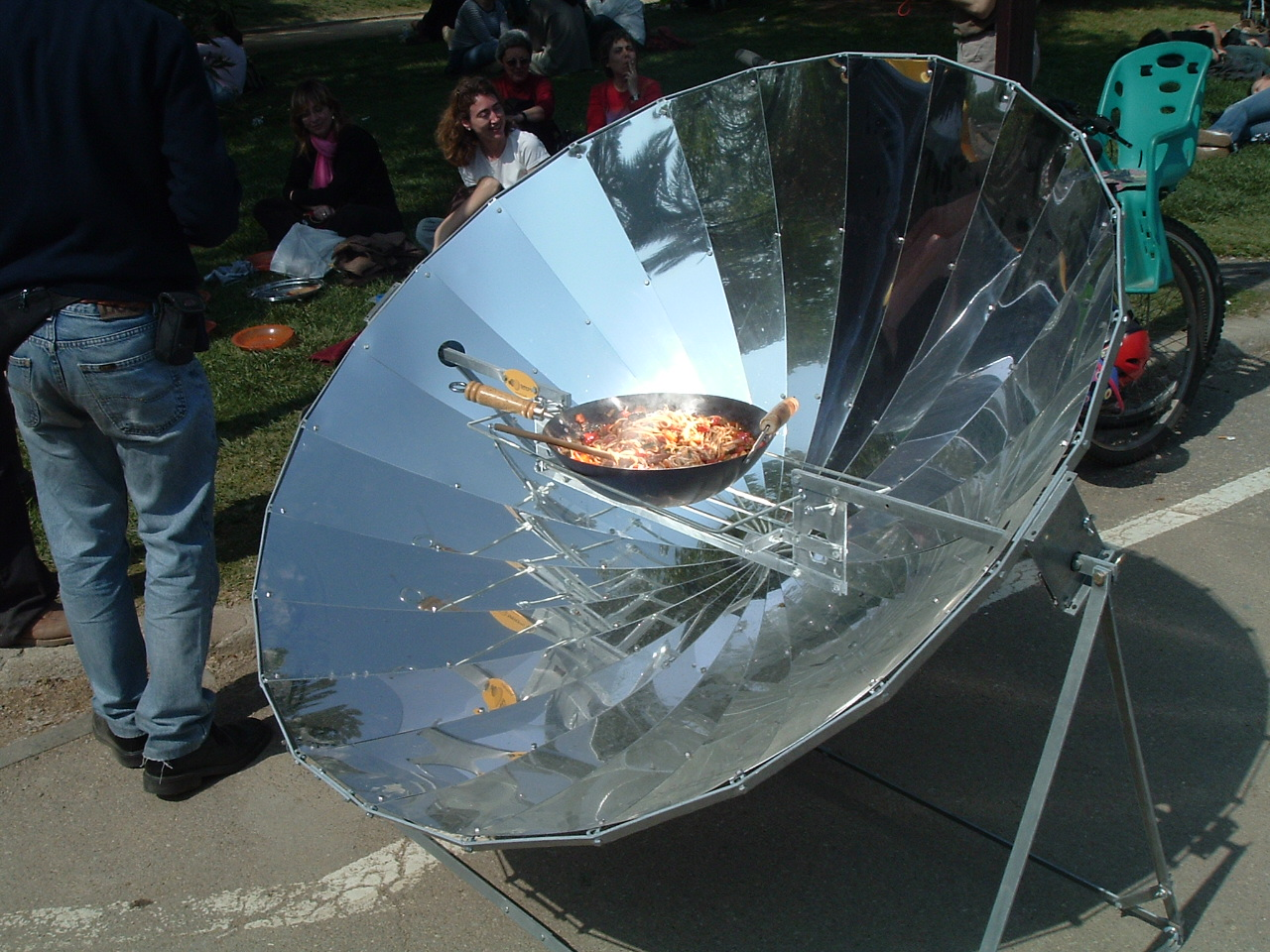
Several parabolic solar cookers

Parabolic solar cookers concentrate sunlight to a single point. When this point is focused on the bottom of a pot, it can heat the pot quickly to very high temperatures which can often be comparable with the temperatures achieved in gas and charcoal grills. These types of solar cookers are widely used in several regions of the world, most notably in China and India where hundreds of thousands of families currently use parabolic solar cookers for preparing food and heating water. Some parabolic solar cooker projects in China abate between 1–4 tons of carbon dioxide per year and receive carbon credits through the Clean Development Mechanism (CDM) and Gold Standard. Some parabolic solar cookers incorporate cutting-edge materials and designs which lead to solar energy efficiencies >90%. Others are large enough to feed thousands of people each day, such as the solar bowl at Auroville in India, which makes two meals per day for 1,000 people.

If a reflector is axially symmetrical and shaped so its cross-section is a parabola, it has the property of bringing parallel rays of light (such as sunlight) to a point focus. If the axis of symmetry is aimed at the Sun, any object that is located at the focus receives highly concentrated sunlight, and therefore becomes very hot. This is the basis for the use of this kind of reflector for solar cooking.

Paraboloids are compound curves, which are more difficult to make with simple equipment than single curves. Although paraboloidal solar cookers can cook as well as or better than a conventional stove, they are difficult to construct by hand. Frequently, these reflectors are made using many small segments that are all single curves which together approximate compound curves.

Although paraboloids are difficult to make from flat sheets of solid material, they can be made quite simply by rotating open-topped containers which hold liquids. The top surface of a liquid which is being rotated at constant speed around a vertical axis naturally takes the form of a paraboloid. Centrifugal force causes material to move outward from the axis of rotation until a deep enough depression is formed in the surface for the force to be balanced by the levelling effect of gravity. It turns out that the depression is an exact paraboloid. (See Liquid-mirror telescope). If the material solidifies while it is rotating, the paraboloidal shape is maintained after the rotation stops, and can be used to make a reflector. This rotation technique is sometimes used to make paraboloidal mirrors for astronomical telescopes, and has also been used for solar cookers. Devices for constructing such paraboloids are known as rotating furnaces.

Paraboloidal reflectors generate high temperatures and cook quickly, but require frequent adjustment and supervision for safe operation. Several hundred thousand exist, mainly in China. They are especially useful for individual household and large-scale institutional cooking.

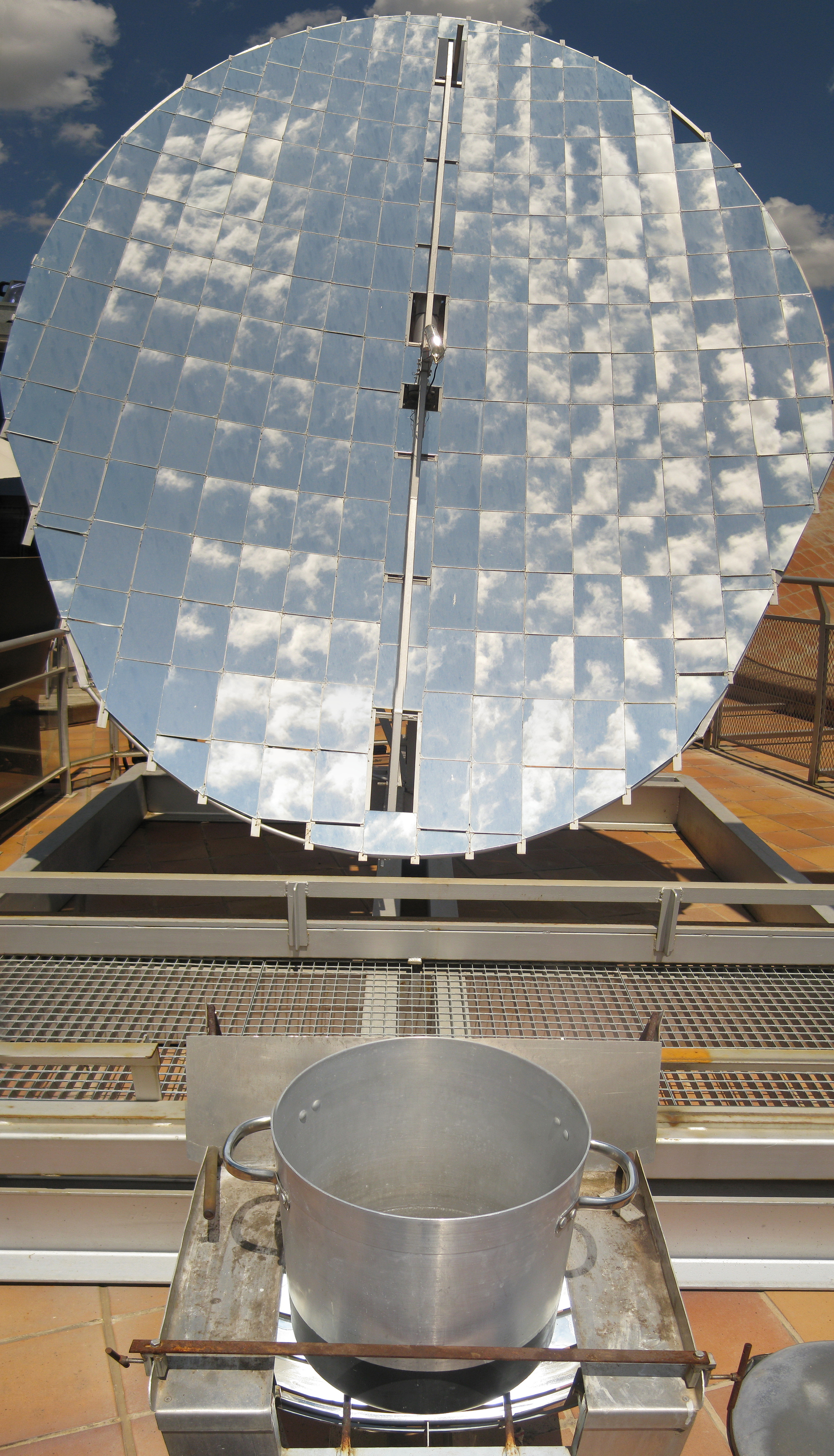
Scheffler cooker with area 16 m^{2} (170 sq ft) which concentrates 3 kW of heat

A Scheffler cooker (named after its inventor, Wolfgang Scheffler) uses a large ideally paraboloidal reflector which is rotated around an axis that is parallel with the Earth's using a mechanical mechanism, turning at 15 degrees per hour to compensate for the Earth's rotation. The axis passes through the reflector's centre of mass, allowing the reflector to be turned easily. The cooking vessel is located at the focus which is on the axis of rotation, so the mirror concentrates sunlight onto it all day. The mirror has to be occasionally tilted about a perpendicular axis to compensate for the seasonal variation in the Sun's declination. This perpendicular axis does not pass through the cooking vessel. Therefore, if the reflector were a rigid paraboloid, its focus would not remain stationary at the cooking vessel as the reflector tilts. To keep the focus stationary, the reflector's shape has to vary. It remains paraboloidal, but its focal length and other parameters change as it tilts. The Scheffler reflector is therefore flexible, and can be bent to adjust its shape. It is often made up of a large number of small plane sections, such as glass mirrors, joined by flexible plastic. A framework that supports the reflector includes a mechanism that can be used to tilt it and also bend it appropriately. The mirror is never exactly paraboloidal, but it is always close enough for cooking purposes.

Sometimes the rotating reflector is located outdoors and the reflected sunlight passes through an opening in a wall into an indoor kitchen, often a large communal one, where the cooking is done.

An oblique projection of a focus-balanced parabolic reflector

Paraboloidal reflectors with their centers of mass coincident with their focal points are useful. They can be easily turned to follow the Sun's motions in the sky, rotating about any axis that passes through the focus. Two perpendicular axes can be used, intersecting at the focus, to allow the paraboloid to follow both the Sun's daily motion and its seasonal one. The cooking pot stays stationary at the focus. If the paraboloidal reflector is axially symmetrical and is made of material of uniform thickness, its centre of mass coincides with its focus if the depth of the reflector, measured along its axis of symmetry from the vertex to the plane of the rim, is 1.8478 times its focal length. The radius of the rim of the reflector is 2.7187 times the focal length. The angular radius of the rim, as seen from the focal point, is 72.68 degrees.

=== Parabolic troughs ===
Parabolic troughs are used to concentrate sunlight for solar-energy purposes. Some solar cookers have been built that use them in the same way. Generally, the trough is aligned with its focal line horizontal and east–west. The food to be cooked is arranged along this line. The trough is pointed so its axis of symmetry aims at the Sun at noon. This requires the trough to be tilted up and down as the seasons progress. At the equinoxes, no movement of the trough is needed during the day to track the Sun. At other times of year, there is a period of several hours around noon each day when no tracking is needed. Usually, the cooker is used only during this period, so no automatic Sun tracking is incorporated into it. This simplicity makes the design attractive, compared with using a paraboloid. Also, being a single curve, the trough reflector is simpler to construct. However, it suffers from lower efficiency.

It is possible to use two parabolic troughs, curved in perpendicular directions, to bring sunlight to a point focus as does a paraboloidal reflector.The incoming light strikes one of the troughs, which sends it toward a line focus. The second trough intercepts the converging light and focuses it to a point.

Compared with a single paraboloid, using two partial troughs has important advantages. Each trough is a single curve, which can be made simply by bending a flat sheet of metal. Also, the light that reaches the targeted cooking pot is directed approximately downward, which reduces the danger of damage to the eyes of anyone nearby. On the other hand, there are disadvantages. More mirror material is needed, increasing the cost, and the light is reflected by two surfaces instead of one, which inevitably increases the amount that is lost.

The two troughs are held in a fixed orientation relative to each other by being both fixed to a frame. The whole assembly of frame and troughs has to be moved to track the sun as it moves in the sky. Commercially made cookers that use this method are available. In practical applications (like in car-headlights), concave mirrors are of parabolic shape.

=== Spherical reflectors ===
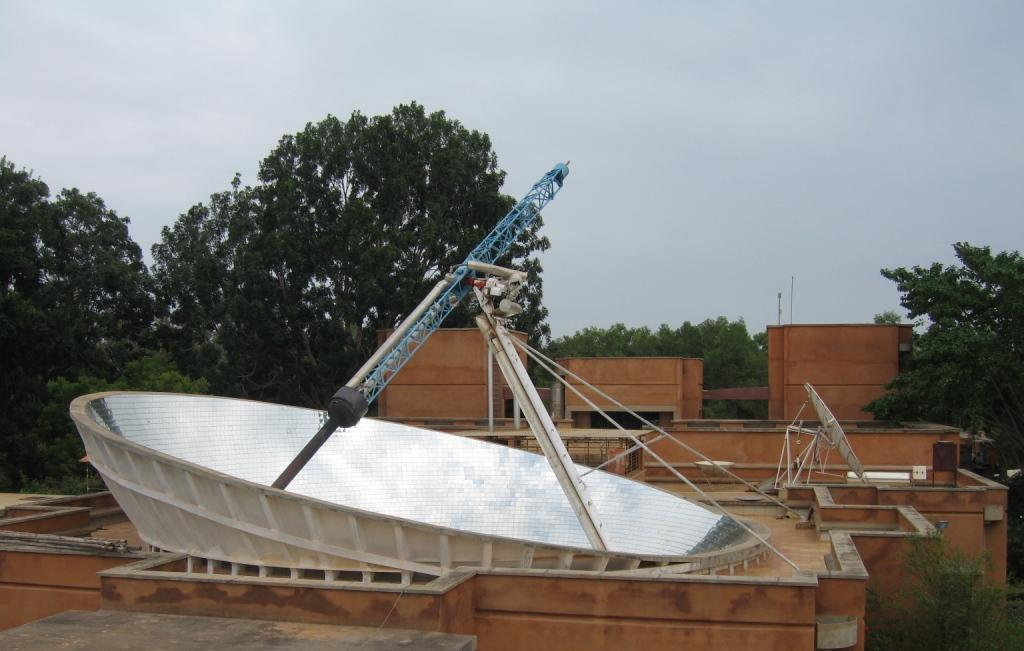
The Solar Bowl in Auroville, India

Spherical reflectors operate much like paraboloidal reflectors, such that the axis of symmetry is pointed towards the Sun so that sunlight is concentrated to a focus. However, the focus of a spherical reflector will not be a point focus because it suffers from a phenomenon known as spherical aberration. Some concentrating dishes (such as satellite dishes) that do not require a precise focus opt for a spherical curvature over a paraboloid. If the radius of the rim of spherical reflector is small compared with the radius of curvature of its surface (the radius of the sphere of which the reflector is a part), the reflector approximates a paraboloidal one with focal length equal to half of the radius of curvature.

=== Vacuum tube technology ===
Evacuated tube solar cookers are essentially vacuum sealed between two layers of glass. The vacuum allows the tube to act both as a "super" greenhouse and an insulator. The central cooking tube is made from borosilicate glass, which is resistant to thermal shock, and has a vacuum beneath the surface to insulate the interior. The inside of the tube is lined with copper, stainless steel, and aluminum nitrile to better absorb and conduct heat from the Sun's rays. Solar cooking tube systems use a reflector to enhance the thermal energy capturing. There are models of tube cooking system in India which has energy storage devices installed at the bottom of the tube to store heat for cooking or heating food during night.

These vacuum tube solar cookers can cook a meal in as little as 20 minutes.

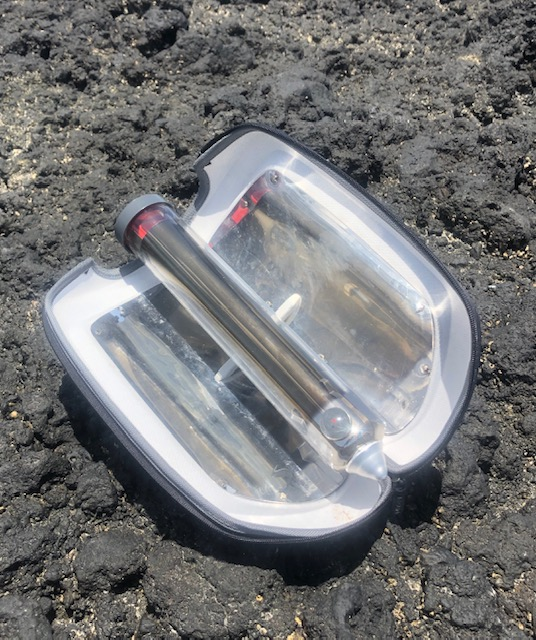
A solar vacuum tube cooker

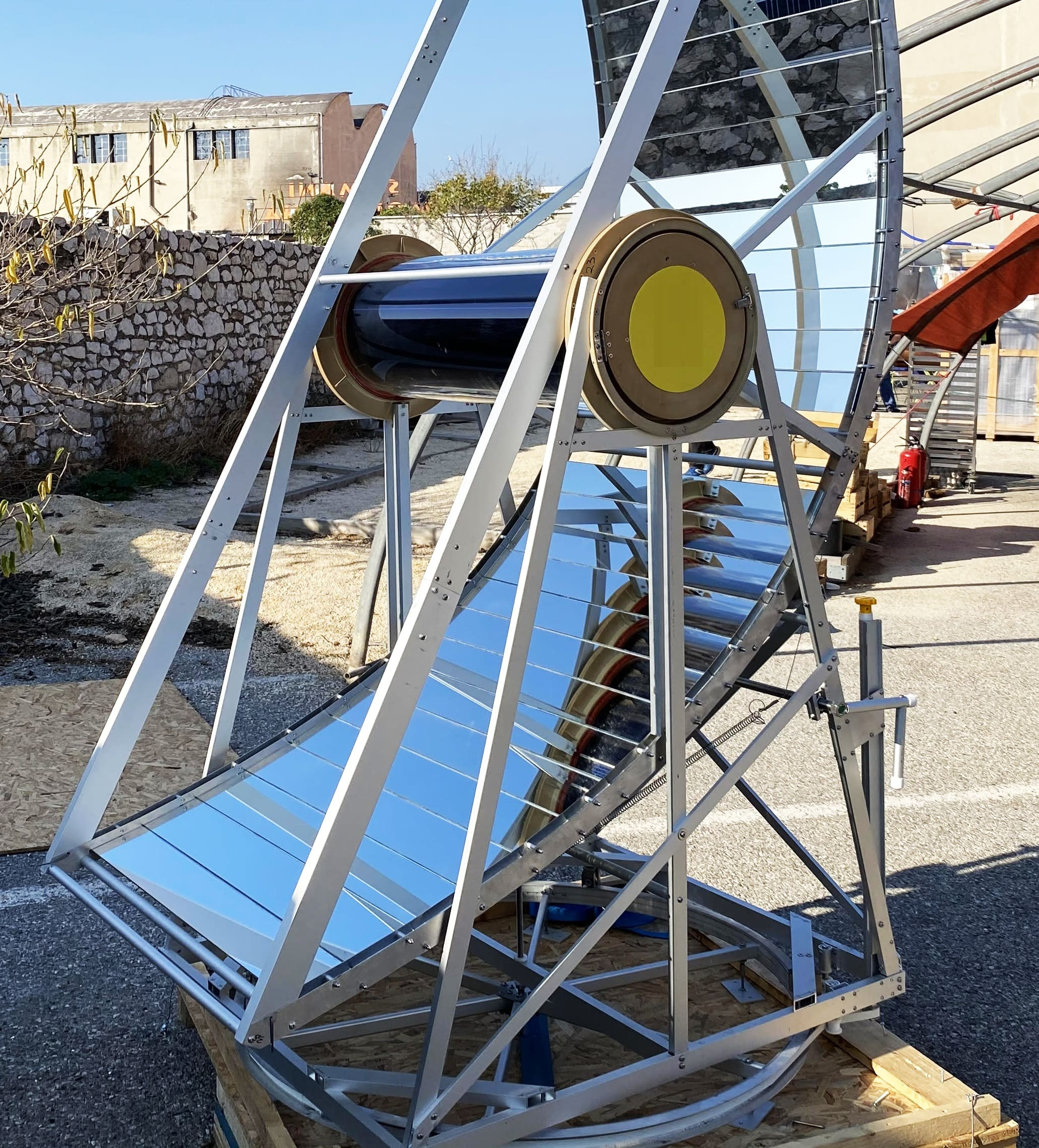
Professional Solar Oven

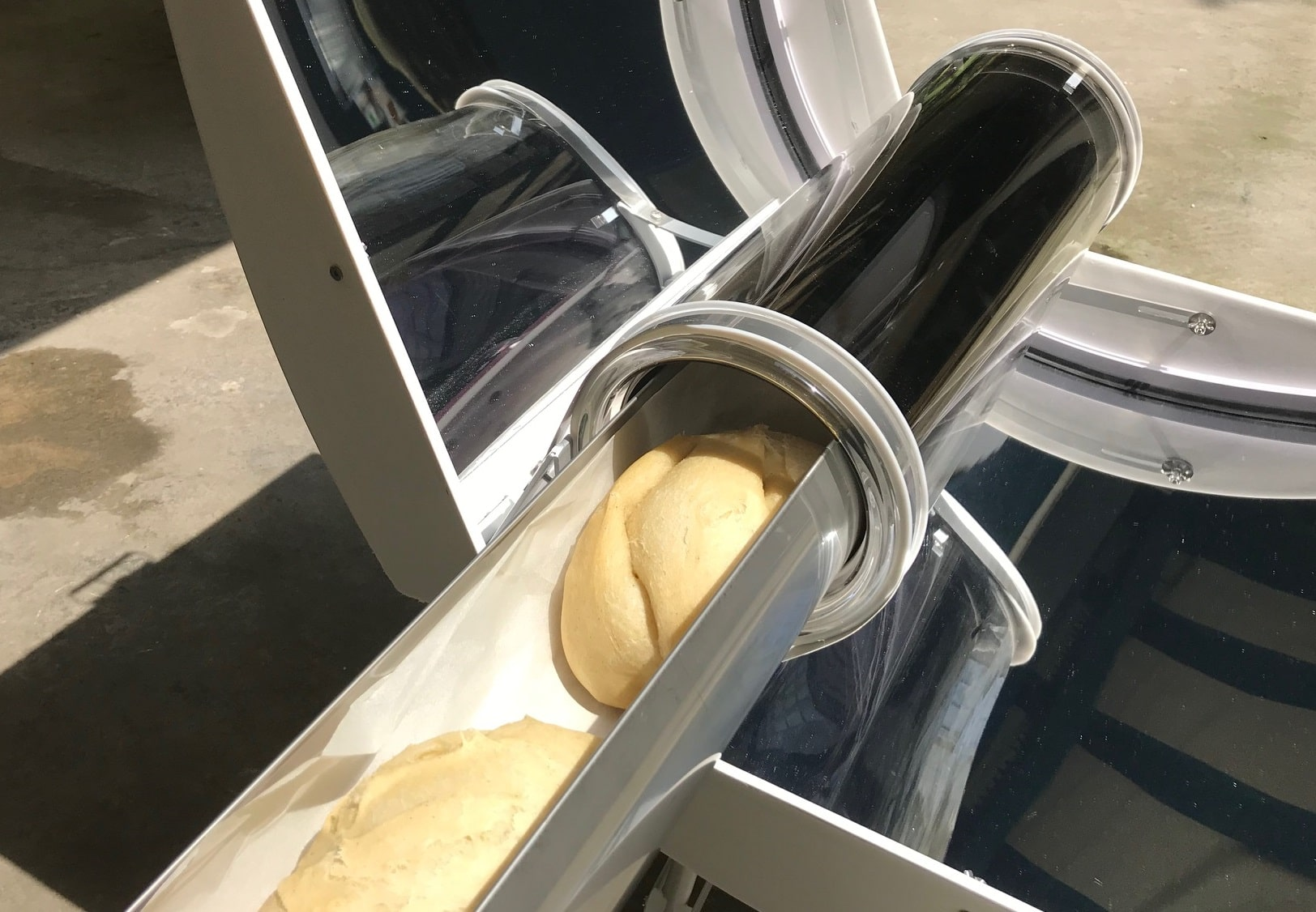
Solar oven glass tube cooking bread

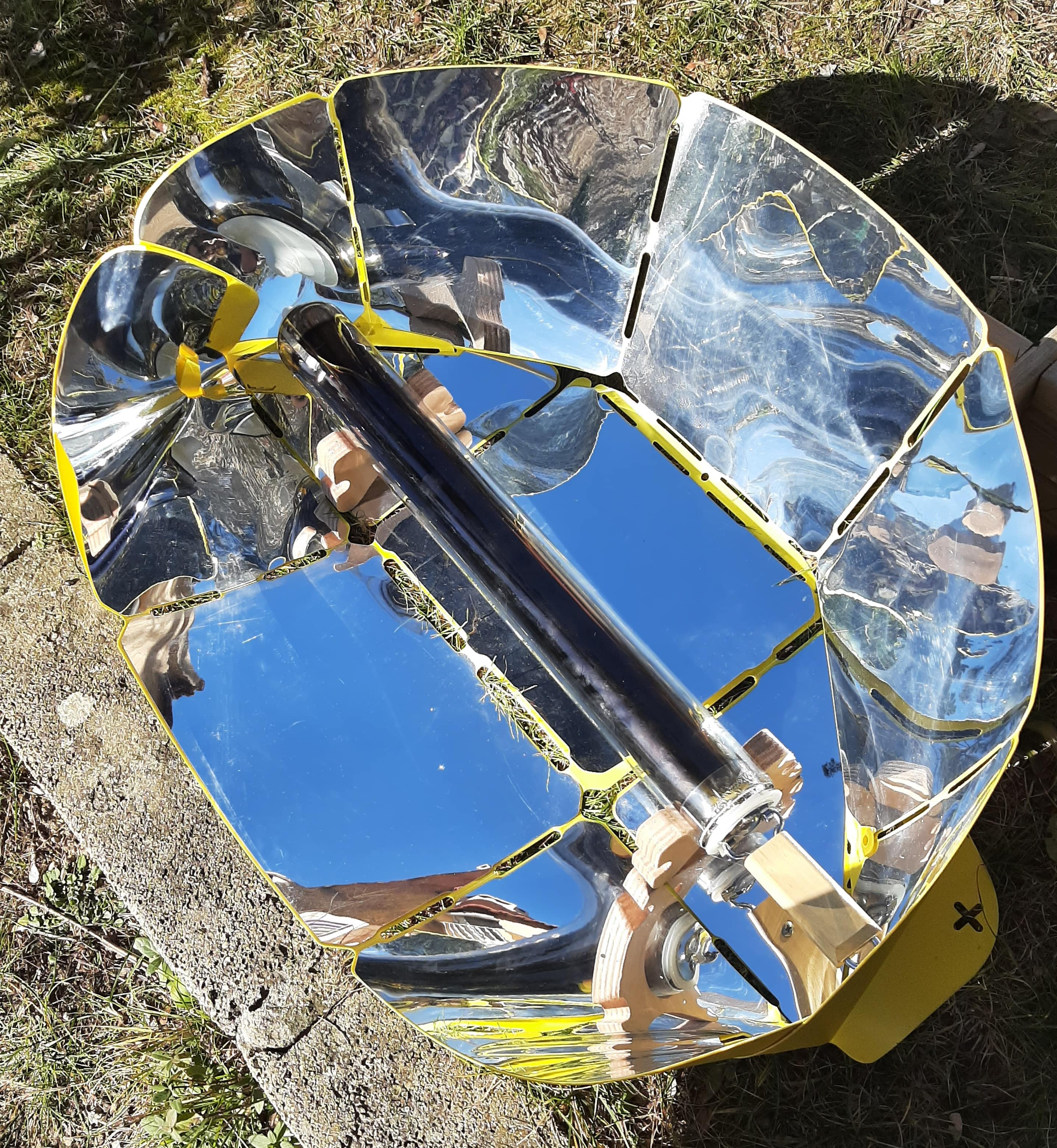
Solar cooker with evacuated glass tube

== Advantages and disadvantages ==
=== Advantages ===
- High-performance parabolic solar cookers and vacuum tube cookers can attain temperatures above 290 °C (550 °F). They can be used to grill meats, stir-fry vegetables, make soup, bake bread, and boil water in minutes. Vacuum tube type cookers can heat up even in freezing and cloudy weather conditions.
- Conventional solar box cookers attain temperatures up to 165 °C (325 °F). They can sterilize water and prepare most foods that can be made in a conventional oven or stove, including bread, vegetables and meat over a period of hours.
- Solar cookers use no fuel. This saves cost and reduces the environmental damage caused by fuel use. Since 2.5 billion people cook on open fires using biomass fuels, solar cookers could have large economic and environmental benefits by reducing deforestation.
- When solar cookers are used outside, they do not contribute inside heat, potentially saving fuel costs for cooling as well. Any type of cooking may evaporate grease, oil and other material into the air, hence there may be less cleanup.
- The thermal efficiency of a typical coal furnace is 15%, whereas solar cookers boast a thermal efficiency of 65%.
- Reduces carbon footprint by cooking without the use of carbon based fuels or grid electricity from traditional sources.

=== Disadvantages ===
- Solar cookers are less useful in cloudy weather and near the poles, where the Sun appears low in the sky, so an alternative cooking source is still required in these conditions. Solar cooking advocates suggest three devices for an integrated cooking solution: a) a solar cooker; b) a fuel-efficient cookstove; c) an insulated storage container such as a basket filled with straw to store heated food. Very hot food may continue to cook for hours in a well-insulated container. With this three-part solution, fuel use is minimized while still providing hot meals at any hour, reliably.
- Some solar cookers, especially solar ovens, take longer to cook food than a conventional stove or oven. Using solar cookers may require food preparation to start hours before the meal. However, it requires less hands-on time during the cooking, so this is often considered a reasonable trade-off.
- Cooks may need to learn special cooking techniques to fry common foods, such as fried eggs or flatbreads like chapatis and tortillas. It may not be possible to safely or completely cook some thick foods, such as large roasts, loaves of bread, or pots of soup, particularly in small panel cookers; the cook may need to divide these into smaller portions before cooking.
- Some solar cooker designs are affected by strong winds, which can slow the cooking process, cool the food due to convective losses, and disturb the reflector. It may be necessary to anchor the reflector, such as with ring and weighted objects like bricks.
- Intense solar radiation at any focal point or cooking area may produce intense heating and sun burn of any exposed skin accidentally moved into the path of the concentrated rays. The radiation is also dangerous to unshielded eyes and may accelerate the formation of cataracts from overexposure to UV radiation.

== Projects ==
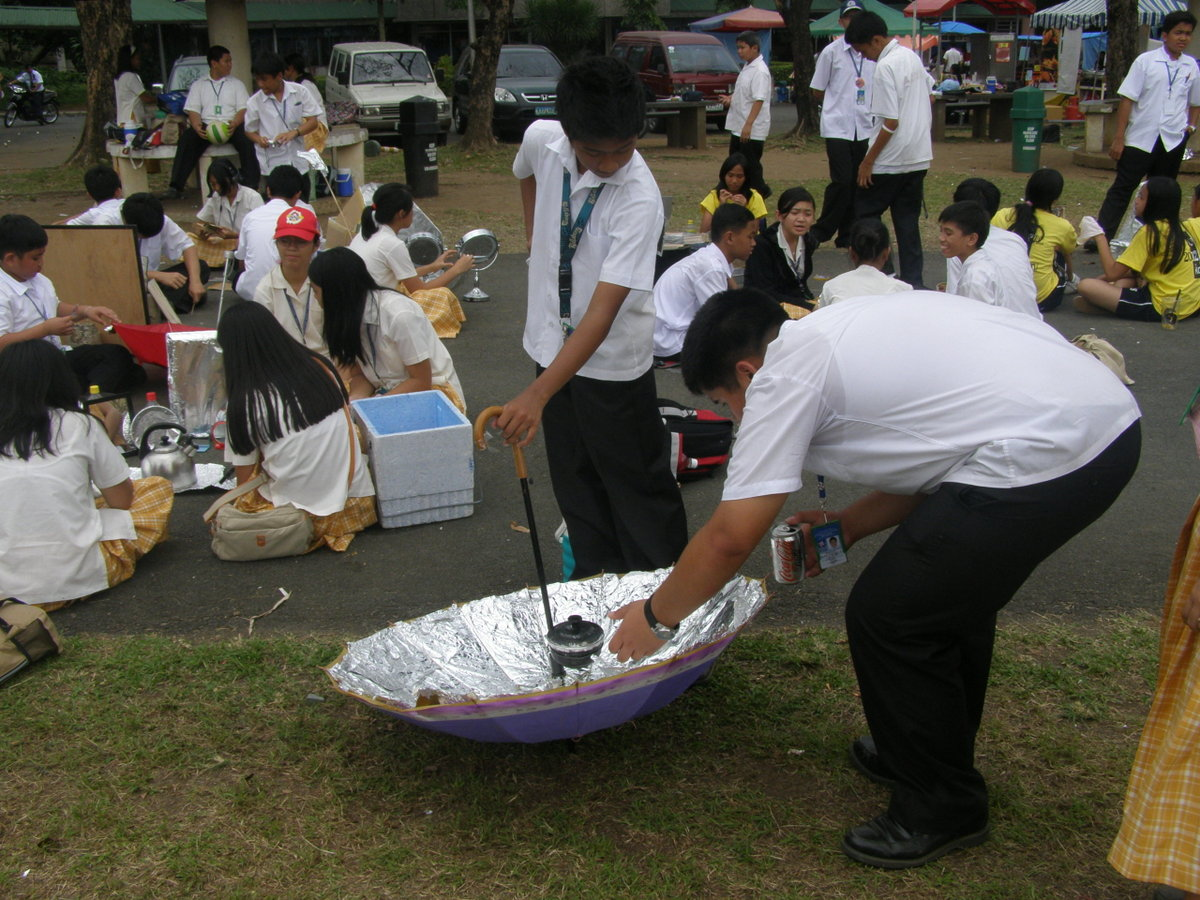
Students perform an experiment using a solar cooker built out of an umbrella

Cardboard, aluminium foil, and plastic bags for well over 10,000 solar cookers have been donated to the Iridimi refugee camp and Touloum refugee camps in Chad by the combined efforts of the Jewish World Watch, the Dutch foundation KoZon, and Solar Cookers International. The refugees construct the cookers themselves, using the donated supplies and locally purchased Arabic gum. It has also significantly reduced the amount of time women spend tending open fires each day, with the results that they are healthier and they have more time to grow vegetables for their families and make handicrafts for export. By 2007, the Jewish World Watch had trained 4,500 women and had provided 10,000 solar cookers to refugees. The project has also reduced the number of foraging trips by as much as 70 percent, thus reducing the number of attacks.

== See also ==
- Heliostat
- Kyoto box
- Liquid-mirror telescope
- List of stoves
- Paraboloid § Dimensions of a paraboloidal dish
- Solar Cookers International
- Solar still
- Solar updraft tower
- Solar water disinfection
- Solar water heating
- Concentrated solar power
