= Marches Energy Agency =

British energy agency

Marches Energy Agency (MEA) is an energy agency in the United Kingdom, operating on a not-for-profit basis. The agency was formed by Shropshire County Council in 1995 to promote the use of sustainable energy in the area. Richard Davies was the director from 1998 to 2014, having previously worked as a chemical engineer. Much of their work is conduction in partnership with local authorities, and focuses on helping communities cut their carbon emissions, especially in rural areas.

== Areas of operation ==
Although MEA initially operated on the English side of the Welsh Marches, it has since expanded its work through service level agreements with Staffordshire Moorlands District Council, the entire Shropshire Council area, and in 2009 to Nottinghamshire and Derbyshire through an agreement with the Local Authority Energy Partnership.

== Awards ==
In 2009 MEA won an Ashden Award for their work to create Low Carbon Communities.

== See also ==
- Low Carbon Communities
- Light Foot Enterprises
