= Low Carbon Communities =

Low Carbon Communities (LCC) is one part of Marches Energy Agency; a climate change and sustainable energy social enterprise and a registered charity, based in the West Midlands, England.

LCC works with interested communities to find sustainable energy solutions for their community. This involves working with households, businesses, schools, and community groups to raise awareness about climate change and help implement sustainable energy measures. This includes energy efficiency measures- both technical and behavioural- and renewable energy installations. Ultimately, LCC seeks to support communities in developing skills and knowledge required to achieve community ownership and enable informed decision-making on energy-saving opportunities.

A pilot Low Carbon Communities project from 2006-9 in three communities in Shropshire has now ended. The project, based in Ellesmere, Cleobury Mortimer, and the “Floodplain Community” (a collection of small villages and farmsteads near Oswestry), aimed to reduce carbon dioxide emissions by 5.88% or 3868 tonnes within these communities. This acted as a pilot for similar ventures around the country, and LCC is now working with several communities in the West Midlands and East Midlands.

== Impact and evaluation ==
The Ashden Awards have mentioned the Marches Energy Agency’s Low Carbon Communities project in their reports. The program have implemented in several geographical areas, like Whittington, Fisherwick, Cleobury Mortimer, the Shropshire floodplain villages near Oswestry, and Ellesmere. According to Ashden, over 1,400 technical energy saving and renewable energy measures have been installed through these initiatives. This has directly helped about 2,000 people, as homeowners, business owners, or organizations. Furthermore, around 19,000 more people have benefited indirectly from wider awareness and campaigning.

In recent years, the project’s impact was calculated as around 9 GWh of energy saved or generated each year. That adds up to about 1,715 tonnes of CO₂ kept out of the atmosphere annually, in addition to the other community actions to reduce transport emissions and encourage buying local products. Local engineers and contractors developed new skills along the way, and some businesses expanded their operations as a result of the project’s activities.

In the broader UK context, community energy efforts like Low Carbon Communities are part of a wider focus on locally led energy transition and decarbonisation. Government and policy documents, like the UK’s ‘‘Community Energy Call for Evidence’’, highlight how community-led projects contribute to national targets for lower emissions and more renewable energy adoption. These community energy initiatives are part of moving toward decentralized clean energy, better energy efficiency, and local engagement in climate action.

== Awards ==
In 2009 MEA won an Ashden Award for the Low Carbon Communities project.
