= Prakratik Society =

Indian non-governmental organization

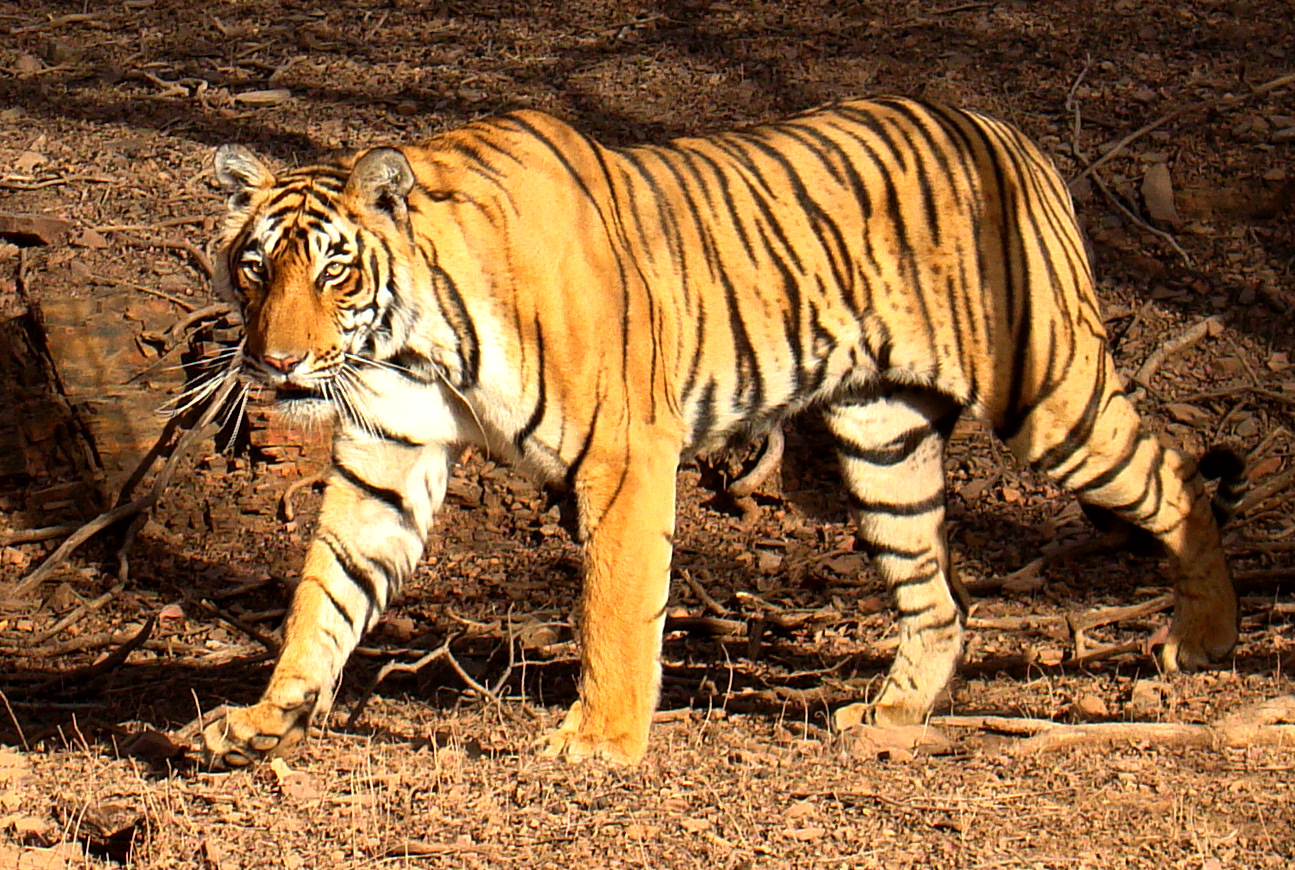
The Prakratik Society's main aim is tiger conservation at Ranthambore National Park

The Prakratik Society is an environmental and social non-governmental Organization working around Ranthambhore National Park in Rajasthan, India, one of the world’s best known tiger preserves.

== Founding ==
Founded in 1994 by Dr. Goverdhan Singh Rathore, the mission of the society is to find solutions to the conflict between people and animals at Ranthambhore, to insure survival of both the tiger in the forest and the large and growing, desperately poor population that draws on the park for wood and live-stock fodder.

Prakratik, (which means nature or natural in Hindi,) was created by Dr. Goverdhan Singh Rathore, the son of the tiger-man, Fateh Singh Rathore.

== Programs ==
The Prakratik Society’s programs include: education, both formal and informal, an English-language-medium school, grades K-12 and environmental education through nature camps, environmental awareness competitions, a mobile library, and film screenings in neighboring schools and villages; healthcare, the Ranthambhore Sevika Hospital as well as health-care outreach; family planning and family counseling; alternative energy sources (biogas), agro-forestry to green de-nuded land in the area, artificial insemination to improve local cattle breeding stock, a legal cell to help prosecute poachers of leopards and tigers and collaboration with other local NGOs such as the area’s well-known Tiger Watch. Prakratik also has a big new hospital in the city of Sawai Madopur.

== Awards ==
In 2001, Prakratik received the Esso Honor for Tiger Conservation, in recognition of Dr. Rathore's service to the community and to conservation, which was presented to him by Chief Election Commissioner M.S. Gill. The citation reads "He has worked in community conservation and primary health care with the local communities in and around the Ranthambhore National Park and achieved outstanding results in both population planning and alternative energy. This award salutes Mr. Goverdhan Singh for his service to the community and the nation for his tireless effort and crusade to keep Ranthambhore alive and healthy."

In 2004, Dr. Rathore received the Ashden Sustainable Energy Award in London.
