= Sunlabob =

Sunlabob Renewable Energy
- Industry: Renewable Energy
- Founded: 2001
- Headquarters: Vientiane, Laos

Sunlabob Renewable Energy is a Lao commercial company that provides sustainable renewable solutions to areas that are off the electrical grid. It was licensed in 2001 and its headquarters and base are in Vientiane, the capital of the Democratic People's Republic of Laos. The company operates as a profitable, full-service renewable energy provider selling hardware and providing commercially viable energy services.

Besides Laos, Sunlabob also has operations in other parts of the world. In January 2008, Sunlabob extended its activities to the Kingdom of Thailand through their franchise partner Samui Service Solarpower Ltd. While the focus in the Lao PDR is more on rural electrification, the market in Thailand is more focused on promoting solar water heating and energy efficiency consulting, both for homes and businesses.

In May 2009 after being approached by United States Agency for International Development (USAID), Afghanistan Small and Medium Enterprise Development (ASMED), and (Development Alternatives, Inc.)DAI, Sunlabob carried out an assessment of the feasibility of the solar lamp project in Afghanistan, taking into account the local human, social and technical constraints. One of the aims was to evaluate whether the Sunlabob approach to financing and establishing franchised SME energy service hubs in small remote villages could be replicated in Afghanistan.

In April 2009, Sunlabob embarked on its first development in Africa. Together with its Ugandan franchise partner, TSSD, Sunlabob visited Ssazi village in Northern Uganda and introduced its Solar Lantern Programme.

Sunlabob has partnered with private, public and non-governmental organizations such as engineering company Comin Khmere, the Laos Ministry of Energy and Mines, Electricite du Laos and Engineers Without Borders. It is the winner of the 2008 UNEP Sasakawa Prize and the European Parliament's 2007, 2008 and 2009 National Energy Globe Award. Sunlabob is located in Vientiane.

In 2007 Sunlabob won an Ashden Award for their work with solar powered lighting.

In 2010, Sunlabob established Sunlabob International Pte Ltd and broadened its international presence in Singapore, principally to enhance marketing and business development operations.

In 2012, Sunlabob won a Best Practice in CSR Award at the World CSR Day held in India.

== See also ==
- Energy in Laos
- Alternative energy
