= Appropriate Rural Technology Institute =

Indian technological institute

- Formation: 1996
- Type: Non-governmental organisation
- Headquarters: Pune, Maharashtra
- Leader: Anand Karve
- Website: www.arti-india.org

Appropriate Rural Technology Institute (ARTI) is an Indian non-governmental organization founded by a group of about 20 scientists and technologists to develop innovative and environmentally friendly rural technologies based on modern scientific knowledge in 1996. For its work in sustainable energy, ARTI has won two Ashden Awards.
