= SELCO India =

For-profit social enterprise

SELCO Solar Light Pvt. Ltd.
- Type: Private
- Industry: Solar energy
- Founded: 1995; 31 years ago
- Founders: Harish Hande; Neville Williams
- Headquarters: SELCO Solar Light Pvt. Ltd.,#,147/10 3rd Floor, 9th cross, 1st Phase JP Nagar, J. P. Nagar, Bangalore, Karnataka, India
- Key people: Harish Hande (MD)
- Number of employees: 534
- Website: www.selco-india.com

SELCO Solar Light Pvt. Ltd. is a for-profit social enterprise based in Bangalore, India. SELCO has played an instrumental role in improving living standards of poor households in rural India especially in the state of Karnataka through solar energy based interventions and low smoke cook stoves. In recognition of the services towards reduction of the gap in access to energy, SELCO has been awarded the prestigious Ashden Awards (also known as the Green Oscars) twice, in years 2005 and 2007. SELCO India was founded in 1995 by Dr.Harish Hande an alumnus of IIT Kharagpur with INR 15,000 funding from its co-founder Mr. Neville Williams. SELCO India has installed solar light systems in 2,000,000 houses till date.

Selco Foundation's e-shala (e-school) project takes education to children in rural areas, mostly in areas where power supply doesn't exist by using a solar-powered power storage device, LED projector and tablet loaded with content.

== History ==
In 1995, the two partnered to found SELCO as an energy services company focused on meeting the needs of people lacking adequate access to energy. Initially, SELF took a majority stake in the new company, with Williams as chairman, while Hande retained a minority shareholding position and the role of managing director.

SELCO India eventually came into being in 1995 under the leadership of Hande and Neville Williams, president of Solar Electric Light Fund (SELF). Financial backing was received in December 1996 from Winrock International which released a conditional loan of $150,000 under the USAID Renewable energy commercialization project. This was however on a condition that SELCO INDIA created couple of solar service centers and install a minimum number of systems. SELCO started with a financial model in which each customer would pay 25% of the cost upfront as down payment and will further pay a monthly installment which is affordable and within the average monthly budget of a family in the region. Along with this, SELCO India also provided a year's guarantee to the warranty of the manufacturer along with free service for a year and a 90-day money back guarantee. The loan to Winrock was paid back by 2000.

== See also ==
- Off-the-grid
