= Energiesprong =

Energiesprong (English: Energy leap) is a program that originated in the Netherlands that introduced and retrofitted houses that satisfy energy efficient standards. It has since been implemented in the United Kingdom, the United States, France, and Canada. The program typically consists of snapping a shell of panels to the outside of a building to increase its thermal efficiency.

== Background ==
Energiesprong was created by the government of the Netherlands in 2010 to retrofit existing buildings for higher energy efficiency standards, becoming zero-energy buildings. When the program was launched by the Dutch government, it initiated agreements with social housing companies and contractors to convert 111,000 houses in the Netherlands into near zero energy buildings. Once a house is retrofitted, it would have net zero energy, which means it is capable of generating the total amount of its own energy requirements.

== Principles ==
The Energiesprong model increases the energy efficiency of new and existing buildings through the application of five criteria:

1. Performance guarantees for thirty years
2. Implementation possible in less than one week
3. Affordability created through energy savings and reduced maintenance costs
4. Attractive design with upgraded features
5. Procuring is based on purchasing housing concepts instead of detailed specifications and drawings

Energiesprong retrofitting typically involves snapping a pre-fabricated shell of panels to the exterior of a building to improve its thermal efficiency. The panels are created by taking a laser scan of the building's exterior to create a building information model, which can then be used for computer-aided manufacturing. The work can therefore be mostly completed at the factory, with installation taking less than one week. In contrast to shallow retrofits such as the installation of heat pumps or basic insulation, energiesprong is considered a "deep" retrofit. The renovations should pay for themselves in thirty years.

== Application ==
More than 5,000 homes in the Netherlands have been retrofitted with Energiesprong. In 2018, the first ten homes were retrofitted in the UK as part of its Energiesprong pilot program. Energiesprong has also been applied to buildings in France and Canada, as well as the US states of California and New York.

In the United Kingdom, the home owner - after the refurbishment - pays a monthly fee, which is significantly less than the utility bills before the conversion - and a guaranteed free electricity and hot water.
