= ECAMI =

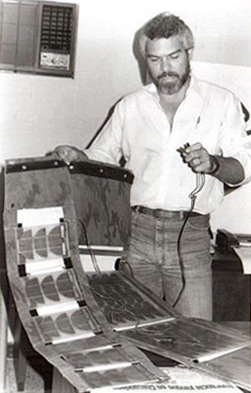
ECAMI founder Luis Lacayo Lacayo in 1982

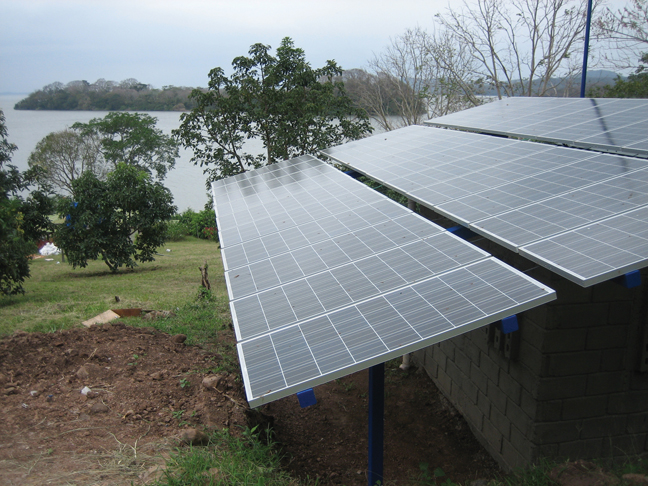
Solar photovoltaic panels at an island tourist destination in Nicaragua.

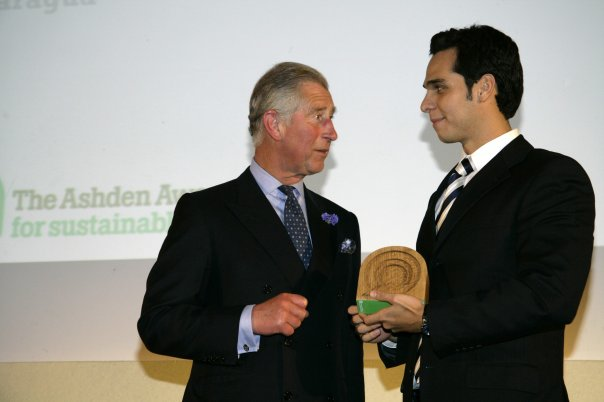
Prince Charles presents Max Lacayo of ECAMI with the 2009 Ashden Award in London, U.K.

ECAMI (Empresa de Comunicaciones, S.A.) is a renewable energy business based in Nicaragua, focusing on solar photovoltaics, wind power and hydroelectric system.

== History ==
ECAMI was founded in 1982 by Luis Lacayo Lacayo, to supply radio communications equipment in rural areas of Nicaragua where infrastructure had been destroyed during the prolonged civil conflict and revolution. Photovoltaics (PV) were the ideal way of powering this equipment, because there was no grid electricity. Many other opportunities for PV became apparent to Lacayo, like home lighting, battery charging, water pumping and refrigeration.

Over time, the provision of renewable energy systems became the main activity of ECAMI.

== Work ==
ECAMI routinely supplies and installs solar-homes PV systems in rural areas. ECAMI designs and installs PV-powered mini-grids to provide power for homes, hotels, museums and planned health centers in small communities. Underground distribution systems connect all the users to the supply, with individual current limits to each facility. ECAMI installs PV supply systems for mobile phone masts, with considerable savings in fuel diesel.

In Managua, six hotels have been supplied with solar water heating systems by ECAMI. One with 50 m^{2} of panel area supplies 100 rooms each of which had previously required a 6 kW immersion heater, another with 16 m^{2} of panels supplies 40 rooms. About 150 domestic solar water heaters have also been installed.

ECAMI supplies and installs small wind turbines of between 400 W and 5 kW output, and can also install hydroelectric systems.

== Impact ==
Renewable energy systems installed by ECAMI have decreased the use of CO_{2} emitting fuels for more than 100,000 people in Nicaragua. ECAMI's systems provide longer hours of emergency service in health centers, the installations of water pumps that bring drinking water to distant communities, access to satellite internet, land irrigation, and longer and more efficient working hours.

== Memberships ==
ECAMI is a GVEP (Global Village Energy Partnership) partner. Other memberships include International Solar Energy Society (ISES), ANPPER Nicaraguan Association of Renewable Energy Promoters and Products, and ANPPER Nicaraguan Association of Renewable Energy Promoters and Products. ECAMI has work agreements with similar foreign companies, including Curin Corporation (United States), Isratec (Guatemala) Energy and Systems (Canada).

== Awards ==
On June 11, 2009, in London, Charles, Prince of Wales presented Max Lacayo the Ashden Energy Enterprise Award for ECAMI's achievements, particularly for the installation of high-quality photovoltaic systems in rural and off-grid areas. The Ashden Awards are an internationally recognised yardstick for excellence in the field of sustainable energy.
