= Solar Cookers International =

Solar cooking advocacy group

- Abbreviation: SCI
- Founded: 1987; 39 years ago
- Tax ID no.: 68-0153141
- Purpose: Advocacy, Building Capacity, and Research
- Headquarters: Sacramento, California, United States
- Region served: International
- Methods: Direct service, Partnerships, Consulting, and Global Advocacy
- President: Dr. Shishpal Rawat
- Executive Director: Caitlyn Hughes
- Revenue: $981,853 (2020)
- Expenses: $589,995 (2020)
- Employees: 8 (2022)
- Website: www.solarcookers.org
- Member of Solar Cookers International Association

Solar Cookers International (SCI) is a 501(c)(3) nonprofit, non-governmental organization that works to improve human and environmental health by supporting the expansion of effective carbon-free solar cooking in world regions of greatest need. SCI leads through advocacy, research, and strengthening the capacity of the global solar cooking movement. SCI has consultative status with the United Nations Economic and Social Council (ECOSOC) and was founded in 1987.

== Recognition ==
Solar Cookers International won an Ashden Award in 2002 for their work with solar cookers in Kenya. In August 2006, SCI was the winner of the World Renewable Energy Award. SCI was named as a winner in the Keeling Curve Prize for sustainable planet solutions in August 2021. SCI won for its work “improving human and environmental health by supporting the expansion of effective carbon-free solar cooking in world regions of greatest need” in the Social and Cultural Pathways category. SCI has also been honored by entities such as the California State Legislature and the Center for African Peace and Conflict Resolution.

== History ==
Solar Cookers International was founded in 1987 as Solar Box Cookers International. Barbara Kerr and Sherry Cole partnered with other supporters to form this organization.

SCI produced and distributed manuals describing the construction and use of solar box-style cookers. They became advocates of how solar cooking could be incorporated into development and relief agency programs. SCI's role evolved into networking with other solar cooking organizations worldwide. They hosted forums for dialog including co-sponsoring three international solar cooking conferences with the University of the Pacific, US, in 1992, the National University of Costa Rica in 1994 and the deemed university, Coimbatore, India in 1997.

SCI also administered a series of solar cooking field projects. Since 1995, SCI has managed or co-managed solar cooking projects in the Nyakach district, Kenya; in the Kakuma refugee camp, Kenya; in the Aisha refugee camp, Ethiopia; in various communities, Zimbabwe; and in Dadaab refugee camp, Kenya.

SCI supported the development of the CooKit, a mass-producible, foldable solar cooker in the 1990s.

== Programs and projects ==
SCI's Water Pasteurization Indicator. The tube on the left shows the state when it is placed in a pot of water to be pasteurized. When removed from the water, if the wax has melted and moved to the bottom of the tube (as in the tube on the right), then the water has reached pasteurization temperature during heating

In efforts to promote solar cooking worldwide, SCI leads through advocacy, research, and building capacity of the solar cooking movement. SCI releases multiple publications a year, disseminating news in the solar cooking sector. To help build capacity for solar cooking, SCI offers a wide range of free online educational resources on its website.

SCI has hosted regional and international solar cooking conferences including the 6th SCI World Conference 2017 in Vadodara, Gujarat, India, and the SCI Regional Convention 2015 in Sacramento, California, USA. SCI also attends and presents at high-level events such as 2021 United Nations Climate Change Conference(COP26), United Nations Commission on the Status of Women (UNCSW), and the CONSOLFOOD conference to promote and advocate for solar cooking.

SCI also runs the Solar Cookers International Association, a group of academics, decision-makers, designers, manufacturers, entrepreneurs, innovators, advocates, humanitarians, environmentalists, and NGOs working to promote solar thermal cooking worldwide.

To demonstrate the impacts of solar cooking, SCI gathers and analyzes solar cooking data. The creation of country-specific economic-impact summaries and a map of the global distribution of solar cookers help deliver evidence-based results about the advantages of solar cooking. SCI estimates there are more than 4 million solar cookers in use worldwide.

=== Performance Evaluation Process ===
Solar Cookers International spearheads the solar cooker Performance Evaluation Process (PEP). The PEP testing program is an objective, scientific process to evaluate solar cooker performance. Evaluation of the performance, user experience, and quality of solar cookers was identified as a high priority by the attendees of the 5th SCI World Conference in Sacramento, California, USA, 2014. The process and instrumentation were presented and demonstrated at the 6th SCI World Conference in Gujarat, India, January 2017.

The SCI PEP testing program is intended for increasing the use of high-quality solar cookers worldwide. PEP test stations automate a protocol that harmonizes with guidelines published by the International Organization for Standardization (ISO). The program is based on the ASAE S580.1 protocol for Testing and Reporting Solar Cooker Performance. SCI currently has testing centers in the USA, Kenya, and Nepal.

=== Solar Cooking Wiki ===
SCI sponsors and maintains a solar cooking wiki which includes over 1700 solar cooking articles categorized by country, NGO, manufacturer, and solar cooker designs. This wiki operates as a virtual community collaborating to improve and disseminate solar thermal technology for its positive impact on health and environmental degradation. Also included is information regarding related technologies such as heat-retention cooking, water pasteurization, solar food processing, solar food drying, solar autoclaving, and solar canning.

=== CooKit ===
SCI developed the CooKit as an adaptation of a cooker designed by Dr. Roger Bernard in France. The cooker consists of a foil-lined cardboard reflector with a dark pot inside a plastic bag. This simple mechanism converts hundreds of watts of sunlight into heat and can cook one or two pots of food at a time.

Cardboard, aluminium foil, and plastic bags for well over 10,000 solar cookers have been donated to the Iridimi Refugee Camp and Touloum Refugee Camps in Chad by the combined efforts of the Jewish World Watch, the Dutch foundation KoZon, and SCI. The refugees construct the cookers themselves, using the donated supplies and locally purchased Arabic gum, and use them for midday and evening meals. The goal of this project was to reduce the Darfuri women's need to leave the relative safety of the camp to gather firewood, which exposed them to a high risk of being beaten, raped, kidnapped, or murdered. It has also significantly reduced the amount of time women spend tending open fires each day, with the results that they are healthier and they have more time to grow vegetables for their families and make handicrafts for export.

== Rating as charity ==
Solar Cookers International was given a 99% four star rating by the charity evaluation organization Charity Navigator, and an A- rating by CharityWatch, which estimated the ground spent $14 for every $100 it raised.

== See also ==
- Solar Cooker
- Energy poverty and cooking
- Household air pollution
- UN-Energy
