= Hande =

Hande (from Persian خنده, meaning laugh, or laughter) is a common feminine Turkish given name.

Notable people with the name include:

- Hande Ataizi (born 1973), Turkish actress
- Hande Baladin (born 1997), Turkish volleyball player
- Hande Özsan Bozatlı (born 1960), dermatologist and former President of the Assembly of European Regions
- Hande Dalkılıç (born 1974), Turkish concert pianist
- Hande Doğandemir (born 1985), Turkish actress
- Hande Erçel (born 1993), Turkish actress
- Hande Kodja (born 1984), Belgian actress
- Hande Özyürek (born 1976), Turkish violinist
- Hande Soral (born 1987), Turkish actress
- Hande Subaşı (born 1984), Turkish actress and beauty pageant titleholder
- Hande Yener (born 1973), Turkish pop singer
