= Ashden =

Charity in London focused on sustainable energy and development

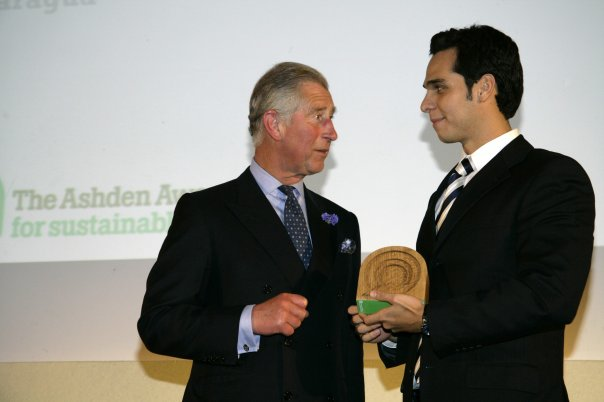
Prince Charles presents Max Lacayo of ECAMI with the 2009 Ashden Award in London, U.K.

Ashden is a London-based charity that works in the field of sustainable energy and development. Its work includes the annual Ashden Awards, advocacy and research in the field of sustainable energy, and mentoring and practical support for award winners.

Sarah Butler-Sloss created the awards in 2001, from the Ashden Trust, one of the Sainsbury Family Charitable Trusts. In 2011 the charity changed its working name to Ashden, with its full name registered with the Charity Commission being 'Ashden, Sustainable solutions, better lives'.

== About the Ashden Awards ==
Ashden rewards promotes local sustainable energy in parts of Europe and the developing world through its annual Ashden Awards. Awards are given to organisations and businesses that deliver local, sustainable energy schemes with social, economic and environmental benefits. Awards are provided across several different categories, including UK and international awards. Awards for sustainable travel schemes have been provided since 2012. Each award includes a cash prize.

== The Awards ceremony ==
The Ashden Awards ceremony is held annually at the Royal Geographical Society in London. Previous hosts include broadcasters Emma Freud, Anna Ford, John Humphrys and Jonathan Dimbleby and environmental journalist Mark Lynas.

Guest speakers in recent years have included Kandeh Yumkella, Prince Charles, Sir David King, Wangari Maathai, Al Gore, David Attenborough, Hilary Benn, (the then UK Secretary of State for International Development), Dr RK Pachauri, Chair of the UN Intergovernmental Panel on Climate Change, David Cameron, (leader of the Conservative Party) and Lord May of Oxford, (former Chief Scientific Adviser to the UK Government).

== Support programmes ==
Ashden provides a package of support for organisations after they win their awards. It also runs 'LESS CO_{2}', a peer-to-peer mentoring programme for schools to learn from each other about energy saving. In 2011 Ashden helped set up the Ashden India Renewable Energy Collective, made up of Ashden Award winners working in India. The collective works to end energy poverty in India by acting as a unified voice for the sustainable energy sector.

== Ashden seminars and conferences ==
Ashden also holds specialist seminars and conferences bringing together their award winners with practitioners, academics, and those who make or influence policy. Examples of recent seminars include one held at Imperial College and another held at DFID.

== List of winners ==
The Ashden Awards have been presented to 205 organisations, including NGOs, businesses, local governments and schools.

== See also ==
- Renewable energy
