= List of social entrepreneurs =

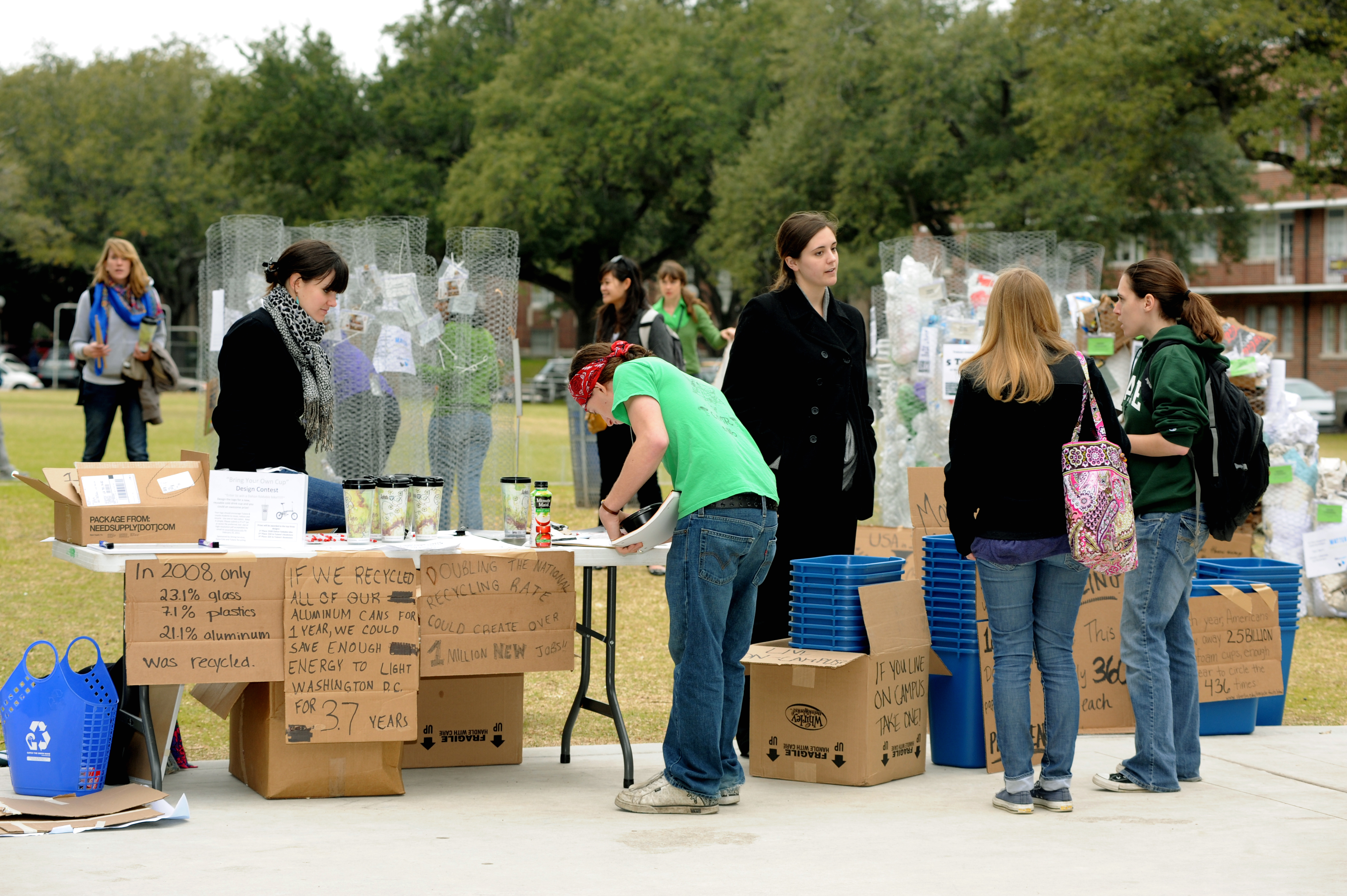
Student organizers from the Green Club at Newcomb College Institute have formed a social entrepreneurship organization in 2010 that aimed to encourage people to reduce waste and live in a more environmentally conscious way.

A social entrepreneur is an entrepreneur who works to increase social capital by founding social ventures, including charities, for-profit businesses with social causes, and other non-government organizations. These types of activities are distinct from work of non-operating foundations and philanthropists who provide funding and other support for them.

== Notable historical social entrepreneurs ==
Name	Country	Social venture founded	Focus areas
Vinoba Bhave	India		Founder and leader of the Bhoodan movement, he caused the redistribution of more than 7,000,000 acres (2,800,000 ha) of land to aid India's untouchables and landless.
David Brower	United States		Environmentalist and conservationist, the Sierra Club's first executive director and built it into a worldwide network for environmental issues. He also founded Friends of the Earth, the League of Conservation Voters and The Earth Island Institute.
Akhtar Hameed Khan	Pakistan		Founder of grassroots movement for rural communities Comilla Model, and low-cost sanitation programmes (Orangi Pilot Project) for squatter settlements.
Maria Montessori	Italy		Developed the Montessori approach to early childhood education.
John Muir	United States		Naturalist and conservationist, he established the National Park System and helped found The Sierra Club.
Florence Nightingale	United Kingdom		Founder of modern nursing, she established the first school for nurses and fought to improve hospital conditions.
Frederick Law Olmsted	United States		Creator of major urban parks, including Rock Creek Park in Washington DC, Central Park in NYC, and Mount Royal Park in Montreal, he is generally considered to have developed the profession of landscape architecture in America.
Gifford Pinchot	United States		Champion of the forest as a multiple use environment, Gifford Pinchot helped found the Yale School of Forestry and created the U.S. Forest Service, serving as its first chief.
Friedrich Wilhelm Raiffeisen	Germany		Pioneer of the rural bond of association as a substitute for collateral in microfinance, and a principal founder of the credit union and cooperative bank sectors that now form a major segment of the European banking system.
Verghese Kurien	India		Engineer and businessman, he planned and executed India's "white revolution", that transformed the milk-importing country into the world's largest produce .
Margaret Sanger	United States		Founder of the Planned Parenthood Federation of America, she led the movement for family planning efforts around the world.
John Woolman	United States		He Led U.S. Quakers to voluntarily emancipate all their slaves between 1758 and 1800, his work also influenced the British Society of Friends, a major force behind the British decision to ban slaveholding.
Sam Pitroda	India		Chairman, National Innovation Council, India
Adhik Kadam	India		Founder Chairman of Borderless World Foundation. He is on peace building mission, working in most conflicted areas in Asia i.e. Jammu & Kashmir on India Pakistan Border. He is working for the children who lost parents in terrorism and conflict.
Arunachalam Muruganantham	India		Inventor of a low-cost sanitary pad-making machine.

== Notable modern social entrepreneurs ==
Name	Country	Social venture founded	Focus areas
Fazle Hasan Abed	Bangladesh	BRAC	poverty reduction, banking, food security, education, woman empowerment
Ibrahim Abouleish	Egypt	SEKEM	Agriculture
Poonam Ahluwalia	United States	Youth Entrepreneurship and Sustainability	Poverty
Vagit Alekperov	Russia	Our Future Foundation	Social entrepreneurship
Gennady Alferenko	Russia	Foundation for Social Inventions	National relations/Civil diplomacy
Zubaida Bai	India	AYZH	Healthcare
Scott Beale	United States	Atlas Service Corps	U.S./International volunteering
Daniel Ben-Horin	United States	TechSoup Global	Nonprofit support
Charles Best	United States	DonorsChoose	Charitable crowdfunding
Ela Bhatt	India	Self Employed Women's Association	Poverty
Taddy Blecher	South Africa	CIDA City Campus	Education
Heather Brandon	United Kingdom	UnLtd South Africa	Social entrepreneurship
Nand Kishore Chaudhary	India	Jaipur Rugs	Poverty
Bill Clinton	United States	Clinton Foundation	Poverty
Vera Cordeiro	Brazil	Brazil Child Health	Health
Ann Cotton	United Kingdom	Camfed	Poverty
Matt Damon	United States	Water.org	Water
Roland Fomundam	Cameroon	GreenHouse Ventures, Youth Action Africa, MoonLight Mining and Restoration Company	Greenhouse technology, sustainable agriculture and technology
Jim Fruchterman	United States	Benetech	Technology
Bill Gates	United States	Bill & Melinda Gates Foundation	Education, healthcare, ending poverty
Abraham George	India	The George Foundation	Poverty
Scott Gilmore	Canada	Building Markets	Employment
Anshu Gupta	India	Goonj	Clothing, disaster relief
Scott Harrison	United States	Charity: Water	Water
Catherine Hoke	United States	Defy Ventures	Incarceration and recidivism
Jeffrey Hollender	United States	Seventh Generation Inc.	Environment
Jessica Jackley	United States	Kiva Microfunds	Poverty, microfinance
Adhik Kadam	India	Borderless World Foundation	Peace-building, peace & conflict, women, children, emergency medical services in conflict.
Salman Khan	United States	Khan Academy	Education
Alan Khazei	United States	City Year	Education
Craig Kielburger	Canada	WE Charity / Me to WE	Human rights
Marc Kielburger	Canada	WE Charity / ME to WE	Human rights
Mohammed Mamdani	United Kingdom	Sufra	Poverty
Nick Martin	United States	TechChange	Education
Ilya Movshovich	United States	CARMAnation	Technology
Blake Mycoskie	United States	Toms Shoes	Poverty
Jacqueline Novogratz	United States	Acumen	Poverty
Jamie Oliver	United Kingdom	Fifteen	Health
Raj Panjabi	United States	Last Mile Health	Healthcare
Mark Plotkin	United States	Amazon Conservation Team	Environment
Bunker Roy	India	Barefoot College	Education
Miyoko Schinner	United States	Multiple	Vegan Food and Activism
Jasvir Singh	United Kingdom	City Sikhs	Interfaith, social cohesion
Param Singh	United Kingdom	City Sikhs	Interfaith, social cohesion
Willie Smits	Indonesia	Borneo Orangutan Survival	Environment
Piya Sorcar	United States	TeachAids	Health, education
Bhargav Sri Prakash	India / United States	fooya FriendsLearn	Digital vaccines for diabetes, cardiovascular disease, hypertension & cancer prevention
Hanumappa Sudarshan	India	Karuna Trust	upliftment of the forest dwelling tribes
Bo Thao-Urabe	United States	RedGreen Rivers	Woman empowerment, poverty reduction
Chris Underhill	United Kingdom	BasicNeeds	Health, poverty
Christian Vater	Germany	Deutschland rundet auf	Poverty, micro-donation
Frederick Yeh	United States / China	Sea Turtles 911	Environment, Education, Wildlife Conservation
Muhammad Yunus	Bangladesh	Grameen Bank	Poverty, microfinance
Matthew Spacie	Britain	Magic Bus	Childhood to Livelihood
Shaheen Mistri	India	Teach For India, Akanksha Foundation	Education
Harish Hande	India	SELCO	Solar energy
Bam Aquino	Philippines	Hapinoy	Poverty Reduction
