= Naked official =

CCP official with family and assets abroad

Naked official (Chinese: 裸官; pinyin: luǒ guān) is a term for Chinese Communist Party (CCP) cadre who live in mainland China while their spouses and children reside abroad. In addition to corruption concerns, the Chinese government believes that officials with family abroad are more vulnerable to coercion by foreign governments and has undertaken restrictions to limit this practice.

== History ==
On 22 February 2010, the "Provisional Regulations on Strengthening the Management of State Functionaries Whose Spouses and Children Have Both Emigrated Abroad" was issued by the Ministry of Supervision, which focused on information gathering to prevent asset flight and combat corruption. During this period, the CCP was lenient on officials with international connections. The anti-corruption campaign under Xi Jinping after the 18th CCP National Congress marked the beginning of a crackdown to the practice, barring immediate family members of top leaders from remaining abroad. In early 2014, a revision of the rules for the promotion and appointment of senior officials called "Measures for the Management of Posts Held by State Functionaries Whose Spouses Have Emigrated Abroad" introduced rules that disbarred officials whose spouses live abroad (or if they have no spouse, their children) from promotion. Naked officials were explicitly banned from military, diplomatic, national security, confidential, and key leadership roles.

In March 2022, the CCP Central Committee prohibited spouses and children of ministerial-level officials from directly or indirectly holding any real estate abroad or shares in entities registered overseas. Senior officials and members of their immediate families were also banned from setting up accounts with overseas financial institutions unless they have legitimate reasons for doing so, such as studying or work. Sing Tao Daily reported in 2025 that in recent years, there has been a requirement that children of provincial and ministerial-level officials studying abroad must return to China within six months of graduation, otherwise their parents will be reassigned. In late 2025, the CCP commenced a campaign to remove naked officials from leadership positions. The campaign has been marked by its strictness, with cadres of vice-ministerial rank or above being required to either repatriate family members or resign from office. In February 2026, the South China Morning Post further reported that since early 2025, the CCP was carrying out inspection on naked officials, with a new focus given on "quasi-naked officials" whose children are living abroad, but whose spouses are in China. It reported that the CCP Organization Department had carried out a survey in the first half of 2025 to investigate cadre with overseas link, with the aim of moving naked officials to less sensitive roles.

== Examples ==
- Pang Jiayu's wife and son emigrated to Canada in 2002. Pang, formerly vice chairman of the provincial committee of the Chinese People's Political Consultative Conference in Shanxi Province, was sentenced in 2008 to a 12-year prison term for bribery and dereliction of duty.
- Zhou Jinhuo's wife had emigrated to the United States, and he tried to join her in June 2006 while under investigation for corruption. Zhou was formerly director of the Industry and Commerce Bureau of Fujian Province.

== See also ==
- Haigui those returned from study abroad
- Gireogi appa similar term for Korean fathers
