= Eyitayo =

Nigerian given name

- Gender: Unisex
- Language: Yoruba

Origin
- Origin: Yoruba
- Meaning: This (Child) is enough joy
- Region of origin: South-west Nigeria

Other names
- Variant forms: Táyọ̀; Èítáọ̀ (Benin

EyitayoEyitayo is a given name of Yoruba origin meaning "this (child) is enough joy." Derived from the Yoruba words "Eyi" (this) and "tayo" (joy or brings joy), the name reflects the happiness, and delight that a child brings to a family. Written morphologically as èyí-tó-ayọ̀.

== Notable people with the given name ==
- Eyitayo Ogunmola –Nigerian social entrepreneur.
- Eyitayo Lambo –Nigerian politician.
- Eyitayo Jegede –Nigerian lawyer and politician.
