= Christian Vater =

Christian Vater may refer to:

- Christian Vater (organ builder)
- Christian Vater (social entrepreneur)
