= Kikokushijo Academy =

Japanese English school

Kikokushujo Academy
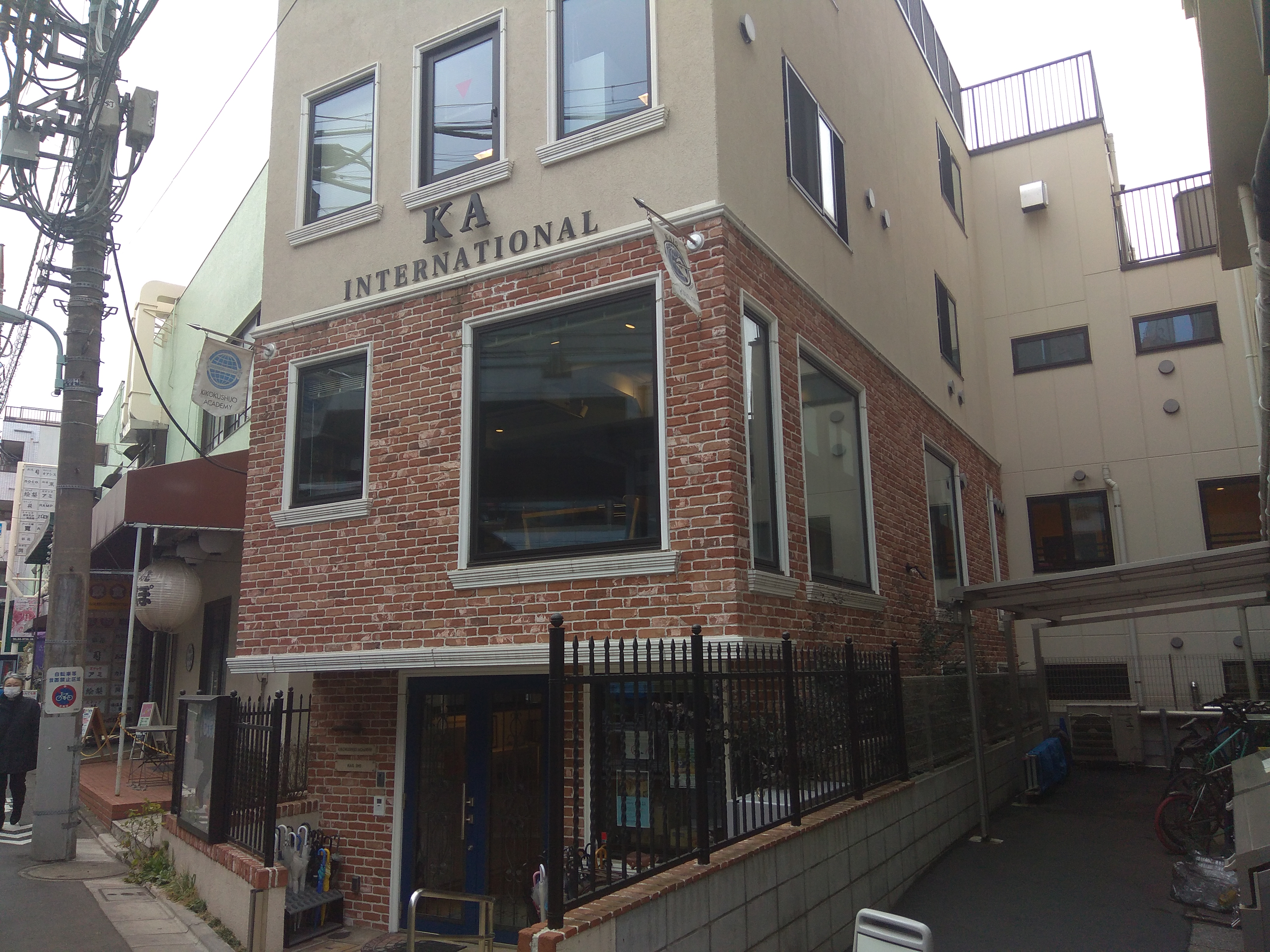
- The main school at Meguro, Tokyo

Location
- Tokyo
- Coordinates: 35°36′31.61″N 139°39′54.18″E

Information
- Type: After-school and weekend English school
- Age range: 6-18
- Affiliation: KAIS International School
- Website: Official website

Kikokushijo Academy (K.A.), an after-school and weekend English program in Japan, specializes in education for returnees (kikokushijo) and bicultural students. It is affiliated with KAIS International School. The academy serves students aged 4 to 18 who speak English at or near a native level. Established in 2004, the academy operates in Meguro, Toritsudaigaku, Meidaimae, Tama Plaza, Funabashi, Nishi-Funabashi, and Shimokitazawa. K.A. also offers a comprehensive online program managed through its online materials and teaching platform, 'K.A. Connect,' accessible to all students. In addition to fostering critical thinking and ensuring students not only maintain but also enhance their English skills for lifelong use, Kikokushijo Academy emphasizes helping students gain admission to junior high schools and high schools with specialized English programs, as well as to universities both domestically and internationally, with several graduates having gained admission to Ivy League schools. In addition to taking internally administered tests to determine the most suitable returnee schools for their abilities, K.A. students also prepare for standardized tests such as the Eiken, TOEFL iBT, and United Nations Associations Test of English, and the SAT and ACT. The CEO and co-founder of Kikokushijo Academy is Charles Knudsen, who is the author of Welcome Home, a guide for parents of returnee children.
