= Olumide Idowu =

Nigerian climate change activist (born 1987)

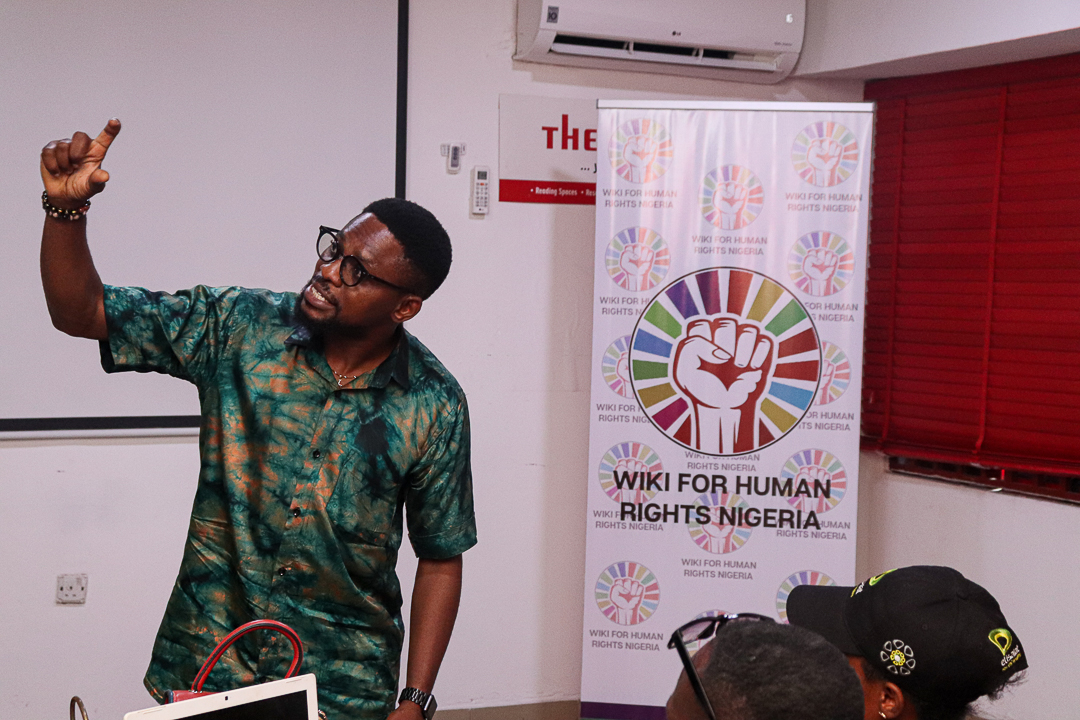
- Nigerian climate change activist, Olumide Idowu addressing participants on the importance of storytelling at the WikiForHumanRights campaign 2021 in Nigeria
- Born: 1987 (age 38–39); Nigeria
- Education: University of Abuja
- Occupations: Co-founder and Chief Executive Officer, International Climate Change Development Initiative (ICCDI Africa)
- Years active: 2013
- Known for: Climate Wednesday, Climate Change Activism, International Climate Change Development Initiative (ICCDI Africa)
- Notable work: Climate Wednesday, International Climate Change Development Initiative (ICCDI Africa)
- Website: https://www.iccdiafrica.org/

Olumide Idowu (born 1987; also known as Mr. Climate) is a Nigerian youth campaigner and climate change activist. He is the co-founder of the International Climate Change Development Initiative (ICCDI Africa), Climate Wednesday and Nigerian Youth Climate Coalition. Olumide was an Atlas Corps fellow, State International Visitor Leadership Program (IVLP) alumni, social media and communications officer for Association for the Development of Education in Africa, Triennale 2017 in Senegal, and the senior communication director for African Youth Initiative on Climate Change (AYICC). He was the Organizing Committee Member for 7th Global Platform on Disaster Risk Reduction (DRR) in Mexico, African Youth Champion for the United Nations International Strategy for Disaster Reduction (UNISDR) and he received the 2015 Save the Children Award for his Contribution towards Sustainable Development in Nigeria.

Olumide is the Youth Focal Point in Nigeria UNDP Small Grant Program, youth lead author for Global Environment Outlook (GEO) of the UN Environment and Executive Coordinator for African Youth Initiative on Climate Change (AYICC).

He is also a member of different local and international organizations. His core focus includes Youth empowerment, Environment, Climate Change, Communication, Monitoring & Evaluation and Sustainable Development issues.

== Early life and education ==
Idowu was born to a Nigerian agriculturist. He studied statistics at the University of Abuja, Nigeria, where he obtained a Bachelor of Science (B.Sc.) in 2010.

== Career ==
Olumide became a member of the executive board and African regional director of the International Youth Federation (IYF) in 2016. In 2018, Olumide worked as the Nigeria country manager for Climate Scorecard, an initiative of Global Citizens’ Initiative,(TGCI) and EarthAction. In this role, he produced a monthly country News Brief called Action Alert highlighting activities that impeded the Paris Agreement implementation, solutions and relevant stakeholders to drive needed action. In the same year, he worked on a mobile app for citizen reporting on waste management and disaster risk reduction.

He was the senior communications director of, African Youth Initiative on Climate Change (AYICC) and became the executive coordinator in January, 2022.

Additionally, he was the Advocacy and Campaign Specialist of Save the Children Nigeria, project coordinator of TUNZA Nigeria, and Research and Reporting Analyst of West African NGO Network.

Olumide is the Youth Focal Point in Nigeria for UNDP Small Grant Program, and the Youth Lead Author Global Environmental Outlook (GEO6).

== Activism ==
Olumide Idowu started his climate activism journey with the AIESEC and Nigerian Youth Climate Coalition in his undergraduate days which prompted his participation in the open hearings of the National Assembly (Nigeria). In 2013, he founded the Climate Wednesday Initiative held on Wednesdays to educate people about climate change and its adaptation strategies. He co-founded the International Climate Change Development Initiative (ICCDI Africa) in 2016 with the aim to build a climate smart generation through creative dialogues and innovations. He has worked on solution-led initiatives focused on open defecation, women's health, waste management, and oil spill cleanup amongst others in Lagos and Rivers state Nigeria.

== Awards and nominations ==
- Olumide was recognized with the 2015 Save the Children Award of Contribution toward Sustainable Development in Nigeria.
- He was nominated for the State International Visitors Leadership Program (IVLP) by the US Embassy in Nigeria, and African Youth Champion for the United Nations International Strategy for Disaster Reduction (UNISDR).
- Olumide won the 2022 US Exchange Alumni Engagement Innovation Fund for a climate education project in Nigeria.
- Olumide emerged as one of the eight recipients of the Tod’Aérs Global Network (TGN) award for young leaders from around the world recognised with the “2022 Global Young Leader of the Year” Award for their outstanding work.

== Publications ==
- The role of youth in realizing their vision for change.
- Grassroots demand for Nigeria in the post-2015 development agenda.
- Impact of Climate Change on Agriculture and Food.
- Agriculture and Youth Development in Africa.
