= Frederick Yeh =

American conservationist

Frederick C. Yeh
- Education: Johns Hopkins University; Duke University
- Occupations: social entrepreneur conservation biologist
- Known for: The unlikely sea turtle savior

Frederick C. Yeh is an American social entrepreneur and conservation biologist who founded Sea Turtles 911, a non-profit sea turtle rescue and conservation organization that operates in the United States and China.

== Early life ==
Yeh attended Montgomery County Public Schools, including Thomas S. Wootton High School, and graduated from Johns Hopkins University and Duke University. In 2007, Yeh discovered that endangered sea turtles on Hainan island, China, were being sold illegally for their meat and shell. During an interview with CNN, Yeh described, "I felt really hopeless at that time ... You would see land turtles and freshwater turtles (in the market) and some of those are legal, but when you see a sea turtle it's clearly not supposed to be there and that's shocking to see." This finding was emotionally disturbing to Yeh and became a turning point in his life, which led to the founding of the first non-profit organization working for the advancement of sea turtle protection and conservation in China.

== Sea Turtles 911 ==
Despite the desperate state of sea turtles in China, Yeh was inspired in 2008 when he saw wild sea turtles undisturbed by people as the animals were naturally basking on public beaches in Hawaii. As Yeh said on a CNN interview, "When you see the sea turtles in Hawaii, how great they are, it's worth it when you can envision that and hope that one day it will happen in Hainan, one day, in China." This experience led Yeh to believe that sea turtles and people could live in harmony and that there was still hope in China because of the successful sea turtle conservation efforts in Hawaii. According to the global authority on nature conservation, International Union for Conservation of Nature (IUCN), the sea turtles of the Hawaiian Islands were also once under the threat of near extinction, but are now thriving and their conservation status reclassified as "Least Concern" according to the IUCN Red List. Thus, Yeh established Sea Turtles 911 under Hawaiian jurisdiction, and changed the course of his life by moving to China to save the sea turtles he had hopelessly witnessed being sold, earning him the nickname "The unlikely sea turtle savior" by the BBC. Building a floating sea turtle hospital in a Chinese fishing village known for its extensive sea turtle poaching, Yeh makes a point to work with people of all types to support sea turtle conservation in the area, including government officials, academia, fishermen and poachers, community members, local and international volunteers. At a sea turtle release event held at the Ritz-Carlton, Sanya, Yeh stated, "For our release events, if we can bring multiple sectors in our community together, it will be very beneficial to sea turtle conservation in China. It is my hope that we can put other issues aside and agree on sea turtle rights, for the advancement of sea turtle conservation." Local community members, including fishermen and coast guard police, describe Yeh as a true "Haigui" or a "returning sea turtle," and defer to his expertise when endangered sea turtles are rescued and in need of medical attention.

== Activism ==
Yeh promotes environmental conservation through publicized sea turtle release events in China, and is vocal about ending sea turtle exploitation in Chinese media. As he has said, "Their survival is our responsibility; we must create hope." During interviews with journalists, he is known to use metaphors to facilitate the understanding of environmental conservation to the public. Yeh cautioned the Chinese public not to delay the increased protection efforts of sea turtles until they decline to the same population level as China's cherished Giant panda. In addressing marine pollution problems in China, he reminds the public not to treat the ocean as an enormous toilet and garbage dump. In China, poached sea turtles include endangered Green sea turtles raised primarily for consumption of their meat, and the critically endangered Hawksbill sea turtle raised for the trade in shell products such as jewelry, combs, eyeglass frames, and preserved trophies. During a speech condemning the use of sea turtle products, Yeh echoed Yao Ming's famous quotation, "When the buying stops, the killing can too."

Declaring July 4, 2012, as a day of freedom for all marine animals, Yeh led the release of an endangered Whale shark that had been caught accidentally by a Chinese fishing boat as bycatch, as well as two Green sea turtles. At this event, he proclaimed, "Sea turtle conservation does not only involve sea turtles. When we protect charismatic species such as whale sharks, those efforts spill over and protect sea turtles as well. These two animals share the ocean, and we must learn to share the ocean with them.” Holding humans accountable for sea turtle and Whale shark endangerment, he added that, "protecting them is humankind's responsibility."

On March 23, 2013, Yeh spoke out on climate change and global warming during Earth Hour, the one hour when the World Wildlife Fund (WWF) encourages businesses and households worldwide to switch off their lights to raise awareness on climate change. Sea turtle eggs are influenced by a biological process known as Temperature-dependent sex determination, meaning that their gender is determined by the environmental temperature. Yeh reminded the public, “As the global climate’s average temperature increases, more females will be hatched, jeopardizing sea turtle populations with an unbalanced sex ratio.”

In an interview with China's official state-run news agency, Xinhua News Agency, Yeh called for a celebrity to help save endangered sea turtles by raising public awareness. In 2014, Yeh was answered by former NBA basketball superstar Yao Ming, who consistently ranked #1 on the Forbes China Celebrity 100. Yao Ming joined Yeh in his public sea turtle release events and the duo set free rescued turtles back into the wild, raising awareness together that leads people to "an epiphany that turtles belong in the wild, and not in the market.”

On June 8, 2015, Yeh led a large-scale event in which five (5) rescued sea turtles were released from different beaches around the island of Hainan to maximize conservation awareness for World Oceans Day as recognized by the United Nations. Yeh said, "The emotional experience of watching a sea turtle swim for freedom back to nature reminds us that we are all connected to the vast ocean expanse, and thus have the responsibility to protect them for our future generations.”

On January 15, 2016, United States Ambassador to China and former U.S. Senator Max Baucus joined Yeh in the release of two rescued turtles named Harvard and Yale into the South China Sea. According to Yeh, the U.S. Ambassador’s charitable act was recognized as symbolic because "Sea turtles are charismatic, migratory animals that serve as natural ambassadors of the ocean; as communities and countries work together to preserve this flagship species for future generations, our shared mission to save sea turtles nurtures a peaceful platform of common grounds to improve community and international relations."

== Awards and honors ==
Frederick Yeh and Ambassador Gary Locke, former U.S. secretary of commerce and governor of Washington, show support for sea turtle conservation at their committee meeting.

On March 30, 2013, the Ministry of Agriculture of the People's Republic of China honored Yeh the 2012 Popular Science Award, in recognition for his significant contributions to public awareness of marine conservation.

On January 9, 2015, the International Union for Conservation of Nature officially recognized Yeh as a marine turtle expert in the China region.

On June 22, 2015, Duke University awarded Yeh with the prestigious Global Fellowship in Marine Conservation.

On June 23, 2015, the United States Department of State and the National Development and Reform Commission supported Yeh to lead the U.S.-China bilateral partnership to save endangered sea turtles.

On July 28, 2015, National Geographic interviewed Yeh as their Featured Explorer to inspire children to save sea turtles.

On April 15, 2018, the Committee of 100 officially recognized Yeh as their Next Generation Leader to advance the betterment of U.S.-China relations. Committee delegations have been invited to give briefings to top officials at the White House and Zhongnanhai. Prominent members of the committee include Ambassador Gary Locke, former United States Secretary of Commerce and Governor of Washington; I. M. Pei, renowned architect; Yo-Yo Ma, master cellist; Jerry Yang, Founder of Yahoo!; David Ho, Time magazine's 1996 Man of the Year for pioneering HIV/AIDS research; Michelle Kwan, Olympic medalist in figure skating; and Steve Chen, Founder of YouTube.
