= Scott Beale =

American social entrepreneur

- Born: 20th century
- Education: Georgetown University; University of Delaware; Tatnall School
- Occupations: Government Administrator, Social entrepreneur, writer
- Known for: Peace Corps; Atlas Corps

Scott Beale is an American social entrepreneur and federal government official who served as the associate director for Global Operations at Peace Corps. Before government service, Beale was the founder and chief executive officer of Atlas Corps, a leadership development program for nonprofit professionals. Sometimes called a "reverse Peace Corps", Atlas Corps brings leaders from all around the world to serve in cities across the United States.

== Early life, education and early activism ==
Beale grew up in Delaware and attended the Tatnall School. He attended college at Georgetown University, from which he graduated in 1998. Beale holds an MPA from the University of Delaware.

While an undergraduate at Georgetown University, he organized political rallies at the U.S. Capitol and registered youth voters for Rock the Vote. Beale also interned for then-Delaware Senator Joseph R. Biden Jr.

== Career ==
After college, Beale worked for the State Department fighting human trafficking in India and in Bosnia organizing elections in the late 1990s. He also worked at Ashoka's Youth Venture program and in the Clinton White House. Beale founded Atlas Corps in 2006.

Beale is a co-author with Abeer Abdalla of Millennial Manifesto: A Youth Activist Handbook (2003), a book about the politics of the Millennial Generation published through self-publishing press InstantPublisher.

In January 2021, Beale joined Peace Corps as the associate director for Global Operations in a political appointee role. He served until October 2024.

== See also ==
- List of Georgetown University alumni
- List of social entrepreneurs
- List of University of Delaware people
