= Eyitayo Ogunmola =

Nigerian social entrepreneur

- Born: 25 July 1988 (age 37); Lagos, Nigeria
- Citizenship: Nigerian
- Education: Project Management Institute, UK Edinburgh Business School, Heriot-Watt University University of Ilorin
- Occupation: Tech Entrepreneur
- Organization: Utiva
- Known for: Helping young Africans learn technology skills and move into better jobs globally.
- Awards: UK Global Talent Visa Recipient Entrepreneur in Incubator, Japan International Cooperation Agency MIT Solver Team, Massachusetts Institute of Technology, etc.

Eyitayo Ogunmola (born 25 July 1988) is a Nigerian tech entrepreneur and speaker who started Utiva, a global talent development company that has helped over 45,000 Africans learn technology skills and supported major startups and enterprises to hire talents among Africans and Minorities.

== Education ==
Eyitayo obtained a Bachelor's Degree in Physiology from University of Ilorin in Ilorin, Nigeria in 2010. He also holds a Masters of Science (MSc) degree in Strategy, Leadership and Change from Edinburgh Business School, Heriot-Watt University, United Kingdom and a Project Management Professional Certificate from Project Management Institute

== Career ==
After Ogunmola graduated from the University of Nigeria, he struggled to get a job for at least two years. During this time, he says he felt there was more to his life. In his attempt to make a difference with his life during this period, he realised that the situation was not peculiar to him alone, as several other young people were facing a similar challenge. This inspired him to begin to find means to help these demography of people. He began to work with universities to help young people develop project management skills. He also contacted a number of businesses to try and understand the skills and competencies they looked for from Nigerian graduates, and began to develop the company’s engagement and value proposition around these skills. This was the birth of Utiva.

The more he helped people, he wasn't still satisfied with his reach, as statistics revealed to him there were several hundreds of people scattered around Africa in need of what he was doing. This is what led to him launching Utiva in October 2018, with the objective of helping Africans learn premium technology skills, and leverage technology to help employers around the world find the best talents. As a young product manager, Eyitayo moved to the United States in 2015 to join Creative Associates International as a product manager, working at the Creative and later joined Afrissance in 2017 as a Vice President.

He was nominated for the Prize for Education at Future Awards Africa 2019. He is a 2015 Atlas Corps fellow and a mentor of the Tony Elumelu Foundation Program. In 2019, Eyitayo was made a fellow of the Global Good fund. He is also a Chevening alumnus. Eyitayo is a web3 evangelist.

His company, Utiva, has been accredited in the United Kingdom as an education and learning platform. He kick-started a project tagged, “EyiEko Project”, which is set to empower 10,000 young Nigerians with access to tech skill acquisition and also endow 5000 widows with 500 microfinancing support.

== British Council Chevening Fellowship ==
Eyitayo was in 2018 awarded a British Council Chevening Fellowship, leading to a Master's degree in Strategy, Leadership and Change from Heriot-Watt University. Funded by the Foreign, Commonwealth and Development Office and partner organisations. Chevening is the UK government’s international awards programme aimed at developing global leaders.

== Solver at MIT Solve ==
Eyitayo was a winner of the 2020 MIT Solve innovation challenge, an initiative of the Massachusetts Institute of Technology. His innovation, The Nucleus got recognized as a major innovation in solving the learning gaps of people in rural Africa and without internet access. This project also got funded by HP Foundation and helped trained about 100 Women and Girls in rural Kenya

== Quotes ==
The greatest factor to success is knowing what others do not know.

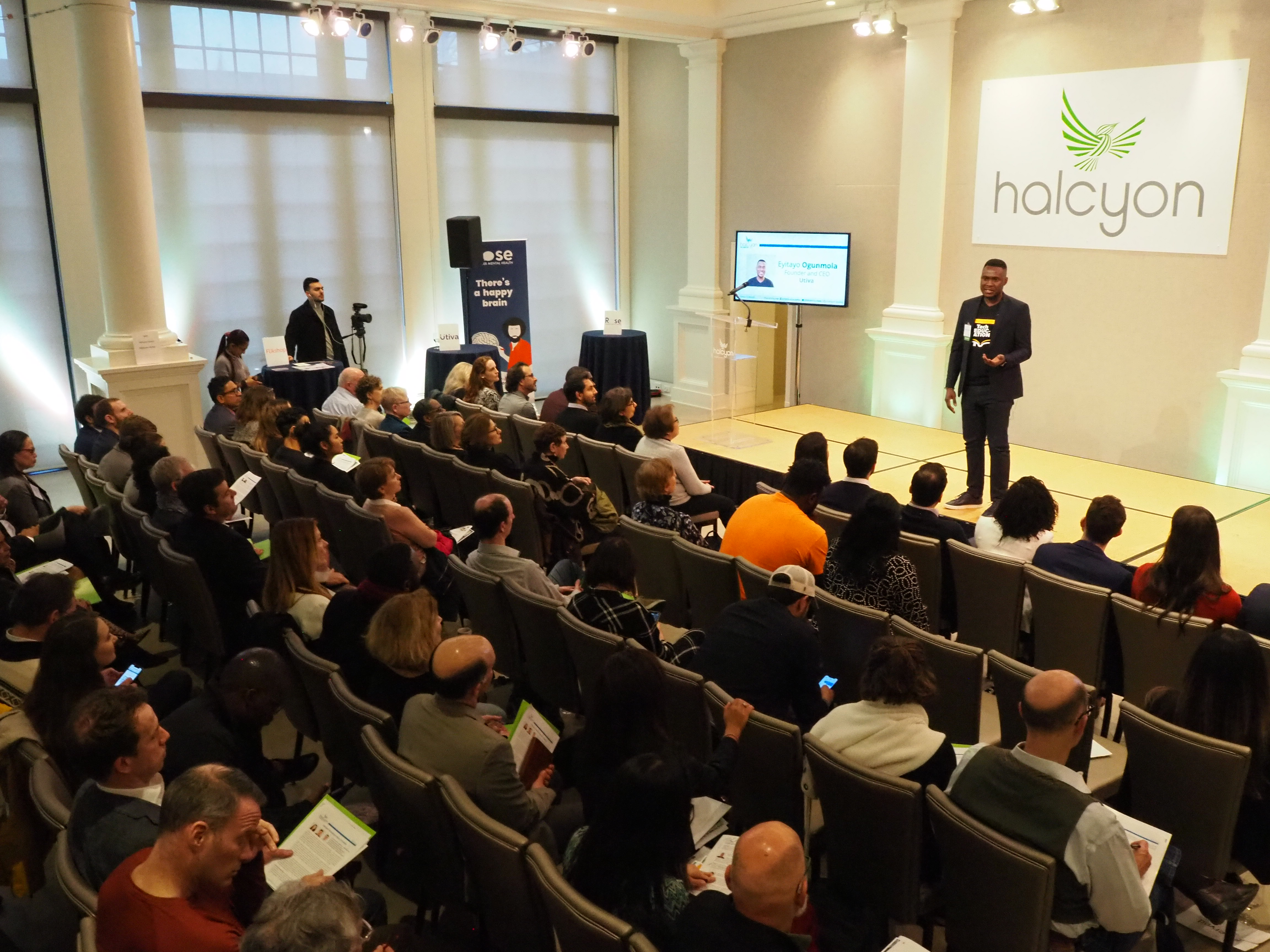
Eyitayo Ogunmola speaking at Halcyon House, Washington DC, United States

== Awards and Fellowship ==
- 2021 UK Global Talent Visa Recipient
- 2020 Entrepreneur in Incubator, Japan International Cooperation Agency
- 2020 MIT Solver Team, Massachusetts Institute of Technology
- 2020 Facebook Community Leader
- 2020 Halcyon Incubator Fellow, United States
- 2019 The Future Awards Africa Nominee for Education
- 2019 UNLEASH Talent, Shenzhen, China
- 2019 Fellow, Global Good Fund, United States
- 2018 Chevening Scholar, Foreign and Commonwealth Office United Kingdom
- 2016 Fellow, Atlas Corps Fellowship (Department of States Sponsored J1 Program). Served in the United States for 1 year
- 2015 Associate Fellow, Nigeria Leadership Initiative
- 2015 Future Leader, Crans Montana Youth Leadership - Switzerland
- 2015 Fellow, LEAP Africa Social Innovators’ Program
- 2014 Fellow, Carrington Fellowship of the United States Consulate Lagos
- 2012 IPMA Young Global e-Collaboration Competition
