= Sea Turtles 911 =

Non-profit conservation organization

- Founded: 2008 in Hawaii, United States
- Founder: Frederick Yeh
- Type: Nonprofit Organization
- Purpose: Sea turtle, Marine conservation
- Location: United States, China
- Method: Grassroots
- Website: www.seaturtles911.org

Sea Turtles 911 is a non-profit organization dedicated to the conservation of sea turtles. The organization was formed in Hawaii, in the United States, and operates primarily on Hainan island, China. The organization directs actions towards public education, policy change through government and academic sources, support of conservation-focused ecotourism, and the rescue, rehabilitation, and release of endangered sea turtles.

Founding Director Frederick Yeh has said, "...if we can bring multiple sectors in our community together, it will be very beneficial to sea turtle conservation in China. It is my hope that we can put other issues aside and agree on sea turtle rights, for the advancement of sea turtle conservation." Efforts are focused on the Hainan Island coastal regions, but educational projects do extend onto Mainland China and internationally. The organization is run almost entirely by volunteers. Operations see hundreds of volunteers, students, ecotourists, and sick and injured sea turtles passing through each year.

== History ==
Sea Turtles 911 was founded by Frederick Yeh, who discovered that there were no longer nesting populations of sea turtles on the beaches of Hainan island as he once remembered from his childhood. After graduating from Johns Hopkins University, Yeh returned to China to promote sea turtle conservation in a region where sea turtles are still being hunted for their meat and shell. Some locals in Hainan now call him "Haigui" or "the returning sea turtle."

=== Facility and location ===
To quell the demand for sea turtle meat and products, Sea Turtles 911 initially began focusing on public awareness campaigns within the tourist resort city of Sanya, China, located on the southern tip of Hainan island. In order to raise awareness with local fishermen and rescue turtles, a sea turtle hospital was built in a floating fishing village in Lingshui Li Autonomous County, where the sea turtle black market was thriving.

The organization's sea turtle hospital is a unique facility in that it is actually floating on the ocean water. At the floating sea turtle hospital, sick and injured sea turtles are rehabilitated and recover inside large net enclosures, which are suspended by ropes tied to the deck above.

Fishing villages all along the coast of Hainan likely contain many thousands of sea turtles in the hands of poachers. Despite the prevalence of poaching in the local fishing community, some local fishermen have befriended Sea Turtles 911 and Chinese coast guard police frequently assist in rescuing sea turtles from the hands of local poachers.

=== Sea turtle use in China ===
Due to a thriving market demand for sea turtle meat, eggs, and other shell products, a sign of status and wealth and believed to promote health and longevity, sea turtles are nearing extinction in Chinese waters. Poached sea turtles include endangered Green sea turtles raised primarily for consumption of their meat, and the critically endangered Hawksbill sea turtle raised for the trade in their shell products such as jewelry, combs, and the frames of eyeglasses.

Due to the over harvest of turtles in Chinese waters, it is believed increasing numbers of poachers are crossing international borders to illegally hunt sea turtles in the Philippines. The trade of sea turtle meat and products is illegal in China as well as internationally.

== Activism ==
Sea Turtles 911's mission is based on the 5 R's: Rescue, Rehabilitate, Release, Research, Raise.

1. Rescue – sea turtles are rescued from poachers who capture and raise sea turtles for meat and shell products.
2. Rehabilitate – sea turtles that are rescued are often in need of medical attention for injuries, illnesses, and malnourishment.
3. Release – the ultimate goal for all injured sea turtles is eventual release back into their ocean home. Turtle release events are organized to raise public awareness.
4. Research – conservation research projects, such as tagging, sheds light into what happens to the sea turtles after releasing them into the ocean, so conservation efforts can be focused in the areas where turtles nest, forage, breed, and migrate.
5. Raise – through public events, outreach initiatives, ecotourism programs, and mass media, raising public awareness to educate people on the importance of sea turtles and how they can help save them, is vital to the success of sea turtle conservation.

Sea Turtles 911 addresses conservation issues by educating the public and tourists about the many threats to sea turtles, encouraging people to discontinue consuming sea turtle meat and purchasing jewelry and items made from the shells of sea turtles. Partnerships are also formed with local resorts, such as the Ritz-Carlton, Sanya, to educate hotel guests and their children about the importance of sea turtles to the environment. In the Ritz's Giveback Getaway Program, tourists are invited to visit the floating hospital to meet the sea turtle patients, volunteer, and learn about sea turtle biology and conservation.

Sea Turtles 911 works closely with local fishermen to encourage the conservation and release of Whale sharks caught as by-catch by Chinese fishing boats.

The organization also partners with universities in Haikou, the capital city of Hainan, by bringing students from Hainan Normal University and Hainan University into the organization to conduct research and educational programs.

=== Major events ===
On January 7, 2011, the Ritz-Carlton and Sea Turtles 911 held a public sea turtle release event in which 7 sea turtles were released, in cooperation with Dr. Nicolas Pilcher, Co-chair of the International Union for Conservation of Nature (IUCN) Marine Turtle Specialist Group.

On May 31, 2011, Sea Turtles 911 volunteers were assisted by local police in the release of a fully rehabilitated green sea turtle back into the ocean following treatment for an injured flipper that was damaged by a fishing vessel propeller.

On October 1, 2011, world-renowned turtle zoologist Dr. Peter Pritchard and China's top turtle expert Dr. Shi Hai Tao of Hainan Normal University joined with Sea Turtles 911 and coast guard police to release a Hawksbill sea turtle in Lingshui, Hainan. The following day, three Green sea turtles were released in Sanya, Hainan, after an educational presentation by Dr. Pritchard and Dr. Shi.

On February 18, 2012, a tagged Green sea turtle was released at the Ritz-Carlton with George Balazs of the National Oceanic and Atmospheric Administration (NOAA). At this event, Sea Turtles 911 introduced Nemo to the public, a newly rehabilitated sea turtle found entangled in discarded fishing line, requiring amputation of his right front flipper.

On March 27, 2012, in cooperation with coast guard police, an adult female Green turtle named Star Blue, was outfitted with a satellite transmitter tag and released. This marked the organization's first conservation research effort to discover and protect areas where sea turtles feed and nest in the South China Sea.

On May 27, 2012, in celebration of China's Children's Day, a juvenile Green turtle was released on Dadonghai Beach in Sanya, with the assistance of students from the National University of Singapore.

On July 4, 2012, in partnership with Ocean Park Hong Kong and Hainan Normal University, a satellite tagged juvenile whale shark was released along with two juvenile Green sea turtles, one of which was also satellite tagged. The event was hailed as a 'Freedom Release', coincidentally occurring on American Independence Day.

On March 23, 2013, two Green turtles were released in commemoration of Earth Hour, the one hour when the World Wildlife Fund (WWF) encourages businesses and households worldwide to switch off their lights to raise awareness on climate change. Sea turtle eggs are influenced by a biological process known as temperature-dependent sex determination, meaning that their gender is determined by the environmental temperature. Higher temperatures due to climate change result in an unbalanced sex ratio, threatening the long-term survival of marine turtles.

On October 24, 2013, athletes from the Ladies European Tour (LET), China LPGA, and Ladies Asian Golf Tour, teed off by releasing two rescued sea turtles in Sanya, China; a Green sea turtle and a Hawksbill sea turtle. Champion Lee-Anne Pace, upon her 2013 LET triumph, continued to champion the cause of the endangered sea turtles by officially adopting a baby sea turtle hatchling, which she named, Jagger.

On January 18, 2014, government officials from the United States and China released three rescued sea turtles during the opening ceremony of the Sea Turtle Shelter, an educational facility to raise public awareness on environmental conservation issues, while providing a temporary home for rehabilitated sea turtles. The event fostered a peaceful platform to improve China–United States relations by focusing on the shared global mission of saving sea turtles from extinction. As U.S. Consul General Jennifer Galt said, “Our governments must continue to work together to develop policy and programs that protect our most precious resources, businesses must play an active role in responsible development, and groups like Sea Turtles 911 must continue to fight for protection of local resources like sea turtles through education and outreach.”

On June 16, 2014, NBA player Yao Ming and his family joined Sea Turtles 911 to release rescued sea turtles back to nature. "I think it’s very important to raise awareness in our country about protecting wild animals and passing it on to our next generation like my daughter," said Yao Ming.

On October 30, 2014, during the Mission Hills golf tournament, Sea Turtles 911 presented NBA superstar Yao Ming with the World Sea Turtle Conservation Award. Yao Ming continued to raise awareness for marine turtle protection, saying, "Sea turtles have an important role in the balance of our ocean's ecosystem."

On June 8, 2015, five (5) rescued sea turtles were released from different beaches around Hainan island to maximize conservation awareness for World Oceans Day as recognized by the United Nations.

On June 23, 2015, during the U.S.–China Strategic and Economic Dialogue, the United States State Department and the National Development and Reform Commission agreed "for the first time, to tackle marine species, agreeing to collaborate in stemming the illegal trade in totoaba and sea turtles, share public education best practices, and work jointly on enforcement." To move forward with this initiative, the United States and China announced their official support for Sea Turtles 911 and Hainan Normal University to "track sea turtle migration, help restore habitats, and foster community involvement in sea turtle protection," as part of the U.S.-China EcoPartnerships.

On January 15, 2016, United States Ambassador to China and former U.S. Senator Max Baucus supported sea turtle conservation in South China's Hainan province with Sea Turtles 911. Baucus released two satellite tagged turtles named Harvard and Yale into the South China Sea for conservation purposes. According to Founder Frederick Yeh, the U.S. Ambassador's charitable act was recognized as symbolic because "Sea turtles are charismatic, migratory animals that serve as natural ambassadors of the ocean; as communities and countries work together to preserve this flagship species for future generations, our shared mission to save sea turtles nurtures a peaceful platform of common grounds to improve community and international relations."

== See also ==
- Animal welfare in China
