= Akanksha Foundation =

Indian educational charity

- Founded: 1991
- Founder: Shaheen Mistri
- Type: Public charity, NGO
- Locations: Chinchpokli, Mumbai, India; Wakdewadi, Pune, India
- Region served: Mumbai, Pune and Nagpur
- Key people: Saurabh Taneja (CEO)
- Website: www.akanksha.org

The Akanksha Foundation is a non-profit organization in India which works with children from low-income communities. The foundation works primarily in the field of education through its "School Project" model. It was founded by Shaheen Mistri in 1991. She now heads Teach for India.

Akanksha runs schools in Mumbai, Pune and Nagpur in partnership with the municipalities.
