= Atlas Service Corps =

- Founded: 2006
- Founder: Scott Beale
- Type: 501(c)(3)
- Purpose: International Cooperation
- Location: Washington, D.C., USA
- Region served: Asia, Africa, the Americas, Middle East
- Method: International Exchange
- Key people: Scott Beale President & CEO
- Website: www.atlascorps.org

Atlas Service Corps ("Atlas Corps") is a United States–based 501(c)(3) nonprofit organization which aims to facilitate communication among international leaders in the international non-profit sector. It was founded by Scott Beale, and formally incorporated on April 7, 2006. It formally merged with Cultural Vistas in September 2024.

== Program ==
Atlas Corps provides fellowships to rising nonprofit leaders from around the world to volunteer overseas for 12–18 months network and develop skills by working at U.S. nonprofits. Afterwards, the fellows return to their home countries to work on programs relating to their fellowships. Atlas Corps fellows come from 155 countries, with the first fellows arriving in the U.S. in 2007.

The Brookings Institution drew parallels with Atlas Corps and a "reverse" Peace Corps, as Harris Wofford originally planned to have volunteers from developing countries work in the U.S. during the formation of the Corps, although that was stopped by resistance from the U.S. Government. The Brooking Institute lists Atlas as a private sector example of that concept.

In September 2024, Atlas Corps integrated with Cultural Vistas to create the Virtual Leadership Institute.

== Atlas Corps Fellows ==
- Vithika Yadav (2007)
- Eyitayo Ogunmola (2015)
- Olumide Idowu (2020)
