= Redrawing India: The Teach For India Story =

Non-fiction book by Kovid Gupta

- Author: Kovid Gupta; Shaheen Mistri
- Cover artist: Sunhil Sippy
- Language: English
- Publisher: Random House
- Publication date: 2014
- Publication place: India
- Media type: Print (Paperback)
- Pages: 286 pp
- ISBN: 8184005636

Redrawing India: The Teach For India Story is a 2014 non-fiction book written by Kovid Gupta and Shaheen Mistri.

== Synopsis ==
Shaheen Mistri, a young college student from USA, visits Mumbai during a summer vacation with her parents. She walks into a slum and meets Pinky, followed by many other children who shape her journey that follows. Shaheen meets the many children of India as the years pass, joining their stories of hope and survival. This book is the powerful telling of a movement that aims to bring young Indians under the collective vision that one day, all children in India will receive an excellent education.

== Reception ==
Redrawing India: The Teach For India Story opened up to mostly positive reviews.

Column Writer Mudar Patherya of Mumbai Mirror wrote in his review, " If I could get a dress circle view into one of India's fastest growing NGOs without knowing the chairperson or chapraasi, then someone at the NGO has been doing a smart job." Huzan Tata of Verve stated that "Redrawing India inspires one to think about the greater cause of education, and what it can do for the children of our country and their future."
