= Kingdom of the Soap Queen =

2014 book by Kovid Gupta

Kingdom of The Soap Queen: The Story of Balaji Telefilms
- Cover
- Author: Kovid Gupta
- Cover artist: Arjit Ganguly
- Language: English
- Publisher: HarperCollins
- Publication date: 2014
- Publication place: India
- Media type: Print (Paperback)
- Pages: 197 pp
- ISBN: 9789351363033

Kingdom of The Soap Queen: The Story of Balaji Telefilms is a non-fiction book by Kovid Gupta.

== Synopsis ==
In the early 1990s, Doordarshan held a monopoly on Indian television broadcasting when the government passed a series of economic reforms allowing private and foreign broadcasters to operate there. The expansion of cable television in India, starting in 1992, further opened the field for new companies. In this environment, teenager Ekta Kapoor launched Balaji Telefilms—kickstarted by Kapoor's mother, and founded in her father's garage—and guided it to success.

== Reception ==
Upon publication, Kingdom of The Soap Queen received mixed reviews.

Soma Das of Mid-Day gave it a positive review, stating, "The book is a soap-lover’s delight and is good reading even for those who are keen to know about the nitty-gritty of getting a serial on air, the grime and effort behind the grease paint and what made Kapoor’s serials tick" ... "You are left in awe of Kapoor who is the heroine of this saga, the odds she battled, how she learned on the job, and managed to influence and transform Indian television in a way that few have ever done". Vanita Kohli-Khandekar of Business Standard wrote that "Unlike most book writers who tackle Indian television, Kovid doesn't come with the air of someone who thinks it is beneath him to comment on this. He is an unabashed fan of the stuff coming out of Mumbai's dream factories and this makes the book a delight to read".

Vrushali Lad of Metrognome called the book "deeply reverential". Naomi Datta of The Indian Express wrote that "Gupta writes like a fan boy," and "while the stories of the frenzy over Mihir’s death in Kyunki Saas Bhi Kabhi Bahu Thi and the Mahabharat debacle are the stuff of television legend," and "it is to Gupta’s credit that he recounts them evocatively". Joginder Tuteja of Bollywood Hungama wrote that "young first time author Kovid Gupta attempts something new by telling the tale of Ekta Kapoor" and that " this book turns out to be good affair indeed that aims at inspiring a reader to dream big and work hard towards accomplishing all of that despite the odds".

Miss Malini praised the book, stating that Kingdom of The Soap Queen was "probably the most in-depth book on Indian television till date", talking "about Balaji and the television industry without getting into unnecessarily personal details" while focusing "on the business angle of succeeding in the television world". Gayatri Jayaram of India Today said the book "explains plot twists by TRPs, and extols the impact of the serials" and was "an adulatory account of Balaji Telefilms when the industry was still nascent".
