= Catherine Hoke =

Catherine Jackson
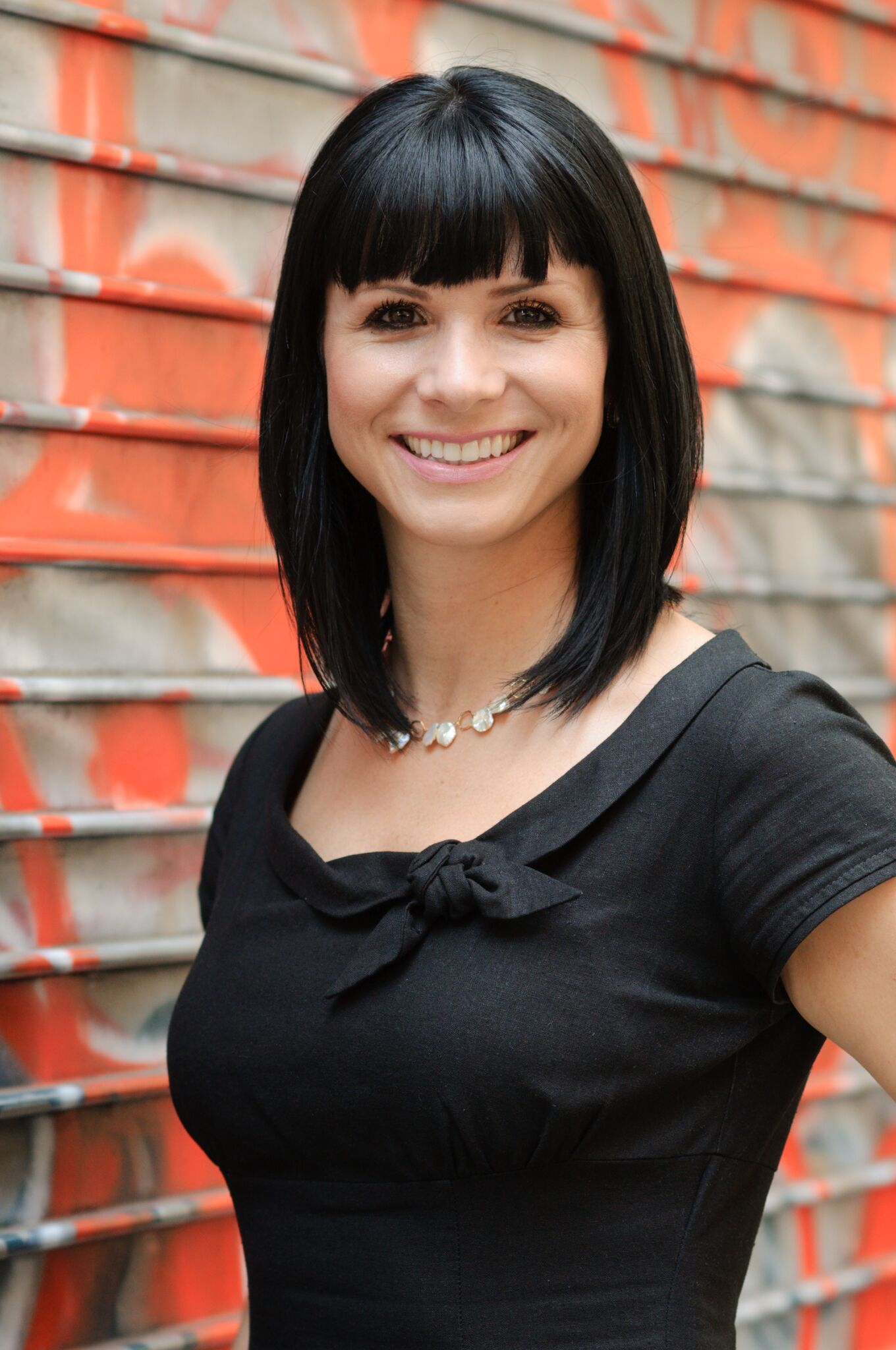
- Jackson in 2017
- Born: Montreal, Quebec, Canada
- Education: University of California, Berkeley
- Occupations: Founder, Former CEO PEP Founder, Former CEO Defy Ventures Founder, Cat Hoke LLC
- Website: cathoke.com

Catherine Jackson (formerly Catherine Rohr and Catherine Hoke) is the founder and former CEO of Defy Ventures, a United States-based 501(c)(3) nonprofit organization.

In 2009, she resigned as CEO from the Prison Entrepreneurship Program after admitting to sexual relationships with formerly incarcerated students. In 2018, she resigned as CEO from Defy Ventures, also launched by Jackson, after further allegations of sexual harassment.

In 2018, she released her book A Second Chance: For You, For Me and For the Rest of Us.

== Background ==
=== Early life ===
Jackson was born in Montreal, Quebec. After graduating from the University of California, she later became the Director of Investment Development at American Securities Capital Partners in New York City.

=== Prison Entrepreneurship Program ===
In 2004, Jackson toured several Texas prisons and found that many of the incarcerated men she met possessed strong business acumen, sales skills, and entrepreneurial qualities, and that many gangs and drug rings are run similarly to corporations—with bylaws, bookkeeping functions, marketing strategies, and quality control programs. She recruited executive volunteers and conducted a business seminar. Four months later, she ran a business pitch competition, which was covered by the Wall Street Journal. She turned these efforts into the Prison Entrepreneurship Program (PEP), a Texas, organization teaching entrepreneurship and character development to incarcerated men.

In 2009, Jackson was banned from Texas prisons after she admitted to having inappropriate relationships with PEP participants after their release from prison.KHOU11 News Article The Texas Department of Criminal Justice deemed those relationships inappropriate and forced her resignation. In October 2017, she was interviewed on Stay Tuned with Preet.

=== Defy Ventures ===
After her resignation from PEP in October 2010, Jackson founded Defy Ventures in New York City. Its vision is "to solve the issue of high recidivism rates through entrepreneurship programs that taught incarcerated participants a comprehensive business skill-set .

=== Hustle 2.0 ===
Jackson has now launched a new program called Hustle 2.0 and appeared in a TEDx talk in April 2021.

== Books ==
Jackson released her book, A Second Chance: For You, For Me and For the Rest of Us under the name Catherine Hoke in early 2018 with a foreword written by Sheryl Sandberg, COO of Facebook). I; the book is about how she came to serve incarcerated people. The book was published by Hoke's mentor, Seth Godin.

== Awards ==
In 2007, Jackson received the Texas Governor's Award for Criminal Justice Volunteer Service for Social Innovation. In 2007, Jackson also received the Manhattan Institute's Social Entrepreneurship Award. In 2008, Jackson was inducted into the Philanthropy World Hall of Fame, and PEP received the “Rising Star” award from the Monitor Group/Fast Company Social Capitalist Awards.

In 2014, Jackson was named in Fast Company's Most Creative People in Business and was elected an Ashoka Fellow. In 2015 she received the MDC Partners Humanitarian Award on behalf of Defy Ventures and was named as a WIRED #maketechhuman Agent of Change. Forbes included Jackson in its 2017 40 Women to Watch Over 40 list.

== Sexual harassment allegations ==
In January 2018, a number of allegations against Jackson and Defy Ventures were made by a former employee. The allegations included sexual harassment, having a sexual relationship with a formerly incarcerated participant, misleading donors, exaggerating the success of the program, and not accurately tracking outcomes of former program participants. The Defy Board conducted a thorough investigation and Defy Ventures the program was cleared of all wrong-doing. Defy is still serving in prisons across the United States. Jackson resigned as the CEO of Defy Ventures and Andrew Glazier became the CEO.https://www.inc.com/david-straus/this-venture-company-of-second-chances-earns-its-own-second-chance.html

== Personal life ==
In 2022, Jackson married John Jackson, a former Hustle 2.0 client and current Hustle 2.0 employee, and took his surname.
