= Kovid Gupta =

Author, screenwriter, social Activist

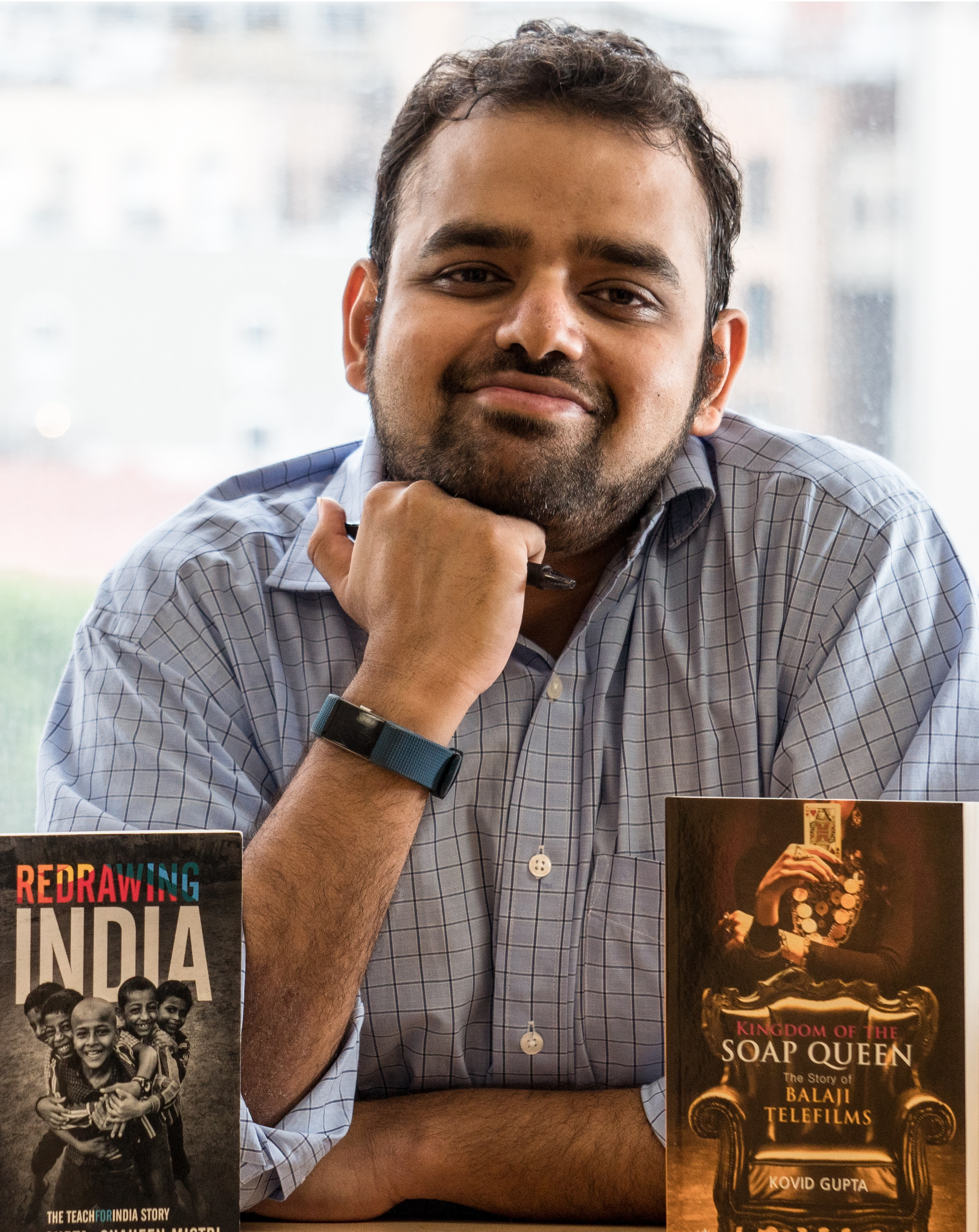
- Gupta in 2019
- Born: 1988 (age 37–38); Houston, Texas, U.S.
- Education: Cornell University (MBA); University of Texas at Austin (BBA), (BS), (BA)
- Occupations: Filmmaker; Screenwriter; Author; Social Activist
- Writing career
- Genres: Fiction, Non-fiction
- Notable works: Kingdom of The Soap Queen: The Story of Balaji Telefilms; Redrawing India: The Teach For India Story
- Website: kovidguptafilms.com

Kovid Gupta (born 1988) is an Indian-American author, screenwriter, filmmaker, and social activist. He gained recognition for his non-fiction works, including Kingdom of The Soap Queen: The Story of Balaji Telefilms and Redrawing India: The Teach For India Story.

== Early life ==
Gupta was born and raised in Houston. His early exposure to Bollywood films played a formative role in shaping his creative interests.

He pursued his higher education at the University of Texas at Austin, earning three bachelor's degrees from the McCombs School of Business, Moody College of Communication, and College of Liberal Arts. Subsequently, he obtained an MBA from Cornell University.

== Career ==
Gupta began his career by screenwriting mainstream Hindi television soap operas, receiving his first break with Balika Vadhu. This was followed by a collaboration with Ekta Kapoor and Balaji Telefilms, where they authored Kingdom of The Soap Queen: The Story of Balaji Telefilms. Later, he joined Rajshri Productions, assisting Sooraj Barjatya on the production of Prem Ratan Dhan Payo. Subsequently, he worked as Head of Business Development at Vinod Chopra Films and Film Companion.

Forbes recognized Gupta's achievements by including him on the 2017 Forbes 30 Under 30 Media, Marketing, & Advertising list.

== Filmography ==
=== Producer ===
- Untitled Dia Mirza and Rahul Bhat Film (2026) |
- An Unquiet Mind (2025)

=== Screenwriter ===
- Balika Vadhu (2010)
- Bade Achhe Lagte Hain (2011)
- Hamaar Sautan Hamaar Saheli (2011)
- Chhan Chhan (2013)
- Bahu Hamari Rajni Kant (2016)
- Krishnadasi (2016 TV series) (2016)
- Devanshi (TV series) (2016)

=== Assistant director ===
- Prem Ratan Dhan Payo (2015)

== Literary career ==
=== Books ===
- Kingdom of the Soap Queen: The Story of Balaji Telefilms. HarperCollins Publishers India. 2014. ISBN 9789351363033.
- Redrawing India: The Teach For India Story. Random House India. 2014. ISBN 978-8184005639.

=== Stories ===
- Gupta, Kovid (Spring 2021). "Boy of the Betel Leaf". Blackbird. 20 (1).
- Gupta, Kovid (22 December 2018). "Reincarnation". The Broadkill Review. 18 (1).

=== Journal Publications ===
- Gupta, Kovid (1 March 2019). "CSR In India: The Companies Act and its Implications" (PDF). Journal of Contemporary Management Research. 13 (1).
- Gupta, Kovid (6 July 2018). "Filmmaking and the India-Pakistan partition: the representation of women in contemporary commercial Hindi cinema". International Journal of Indian Culture and Business Management. 17 (1).
- Gupta, Kovid (22 May 2013). "The Indian Television Melodrama: A Vehicle for Social Innovation". International Journal of Intercultural Information Management. 3 (2).
- Gupta, Kovid (1 February 2011). "Brand Development in Indian Cinema: A Fusion of Traditionalism and Modernity". International Journal of Global Management. 1 (2).

== Awards and honors ==
- Outstanding Young Texas Exes Award (2023)
- McCombs School of Business Rising Star Award (2019)
- Forbes 30 Under 30 (2017)
- Glorious India Award (2017)
