= HF Foundation =

Kenyan-based foundation

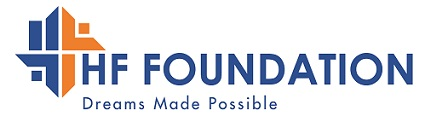
- Founded: 2012
- Location: Nairobi, Kenya
- Origins: Housing Finance Company of Kenya
- Region served: Kenya and East Africa
- Key people: Winnie Imanyara, Executive Director
- Website: housingfinance.foundation

HF Foundation (also Housing Finance Foundation) is an East African foundation based in Nairobi, Kenya. Founded in 2012, HF Foundation is a non-profit subsidiary of the Housing Finance Company of Kenya.

== Overview ==
The main aim of HF Foundation is to deliver, facilitate and catalyze the creation of an employable, effective and entrepreneurial building and construction workforce for the Kenyan and East Africa regional markets, through facilitating the creation of an “Army of One Million Artisans”.

HF Foundation’s core objectives are a direct response to the challenges in Kenya's building and construction industry to help ensure the transformation of the building and construction industry to improve livelihoods, support development projects and improve the quality of construction and workmanship.

== Focus areas ==
Working with partners in the public and private sector as well as the building and construction industry, HF Foundation is working at achieving its mission through three strategic pillars:

1. Relevant technical and 21st century readiness training (life skills)
2. Improved financial access for TVET students, institutions and artisans
3. Creating markets that work for artisans

== Partners ==
To achieve its vision of creating an Army of One Million Artisans, HF Foundation has partnered with the Government of Kenya, the Kenya National Construction Authority (NCA), the Technical and Vocational Education and Training Authority (TVETA), a multitude of industry players in the private sector, and global training experts to facilitate and help implement its programs.

In recognition of its role to help fuel Kenya's rapidly growing economy and transform it into a middle income country by the year 2030, HF Foundation's "Army of One Million Artisans" initiative was granted "flagship status" by Kenya's Vision 2030, a national long-term development blueprint to create a globally competitive and prosperous nation with a high quality of life by the year 2030.

The Army of One Million Artisans initiative was launched by former Kenyan President Mwai Kibaki in February 2013.
