= FriendsLearn =

American health software company

- FriendsLearn logo
- Type: Private
- Industry: mHealth; Startup
- Founded: 2011
- Headquarters: San Francisco, California United States of America
- Number of locations: 2
- Key people: Bhargav Sri Prakash, Founder and CEO
- Products: fooya
- Number of employees: 14
- Website: www.friendslearn.com

FriendsLearn is a privately held life science research and biotechnology mHealth company, with offices in San Francisco California and Chennai. The company was founded in 2011 and develops mobile health technologies, best known as the producer and developer of fooya!. FriendsLearn is a pioneer of Digital Vaccines, which Carnegie Mellon University featured as one of the top breakthroughs in technology as part of the annual "Year in Review" publication. The company is known for first in class therapeutic candidates in the field of neuromodulation and neurocognitive training through the use of artificial intelligence, virtual reality technology, neuropsychology based behavior design, gamification and learnified entertainment.

FriendsLearn is the founding research translation and innovation partner of Carnegie Mellon University's Digital Vaccine Project.

In 2025, FriendsLearn has established a partnership with National University of Singapore Yong Loo Lin School of Medicine and School of Computing and Carnegie Mellon University to further pioneering work on digital vaccines in Singapore.

FriendsLearn and Carnegie Mellon University won the 2022 Transformative Business Award by the Financial Times and the World Bank's International Finance Corporation for their pioneering deep tech breakthroughs with Digital Vaccines under the category of Frontiers Market Solutions. They were chosen by a panel of eminent judges from 219 nominations at a ceremony in London.

== Founding ==
The company was founded by Bhargav Sri Prakash when he was a fellow of the Kauffman Foundation in Kansas City. The United States Department of State and EducationUSA awarded FriendsLearn a contract to design and produce a gamified application based on a track record of the founder's previous company in gamified student recruitment. "Your 5 Steps to US Study" was launched in 2012 and is distributed around the world by US Consulates and EducationUSA centers.

== Mobile Health & Behavior Design ==
FriendsLearn has produced and designed the mobile app fooya, which is the product of the company's innovations in 'learnified' gaming and was presented at the 2014 Stanford MedicineX Conference under a session titled "Scalable Behavior Design through Mobile Gaming".

Health outcomes of clinical trials conducted by researchers at the Baylor College of Medicine's Children's Nutrition Research Center were presented at The Obesity Society's 2014 ObesityWeek Conference in Boston.

In 2014, the company entered into a collaborative partnership with the 2014 ExxonMobil Bernard Harris Summer Science Camp and was used to promote healthy choices among middle school campers from across the United States.

The company was featured at the Bloomberg Next Big Thing Conference in 2013 as an emerging startup in health gaming.

Fooya was first launched as a Facebook App in 2012 at the DEMO Conference in Silicon Valley and successfully raised over $50,000 through a crowd funding campaign via Kickstarter

=== Reciprocity Wave ===
The Reciprocity Wave, a program conceived by Architect. Sheila Sri Prakash, is a Sculpture Competition where students create art work with recycled materials to sensitize the public about social and environmental issues that need immediate attention. Shilpa Architects have already conducted three such initiatives, two in Chennai and one in Bangalore. The most recent initiative at Cubbon Park, Bangalore, brought to light various issues ranging from corruption to women's rights, and gained attention from the Bangalore Media for the powerful concept and impact that it created. Many of the leading daily's published a series of articles about the event and also covered the competition at length. The event also included a Health Gaming Championship involving fooya!, in partnership with FriendsLearn.
