= Gireogi appa =

South Korean term meaning "goose dad"

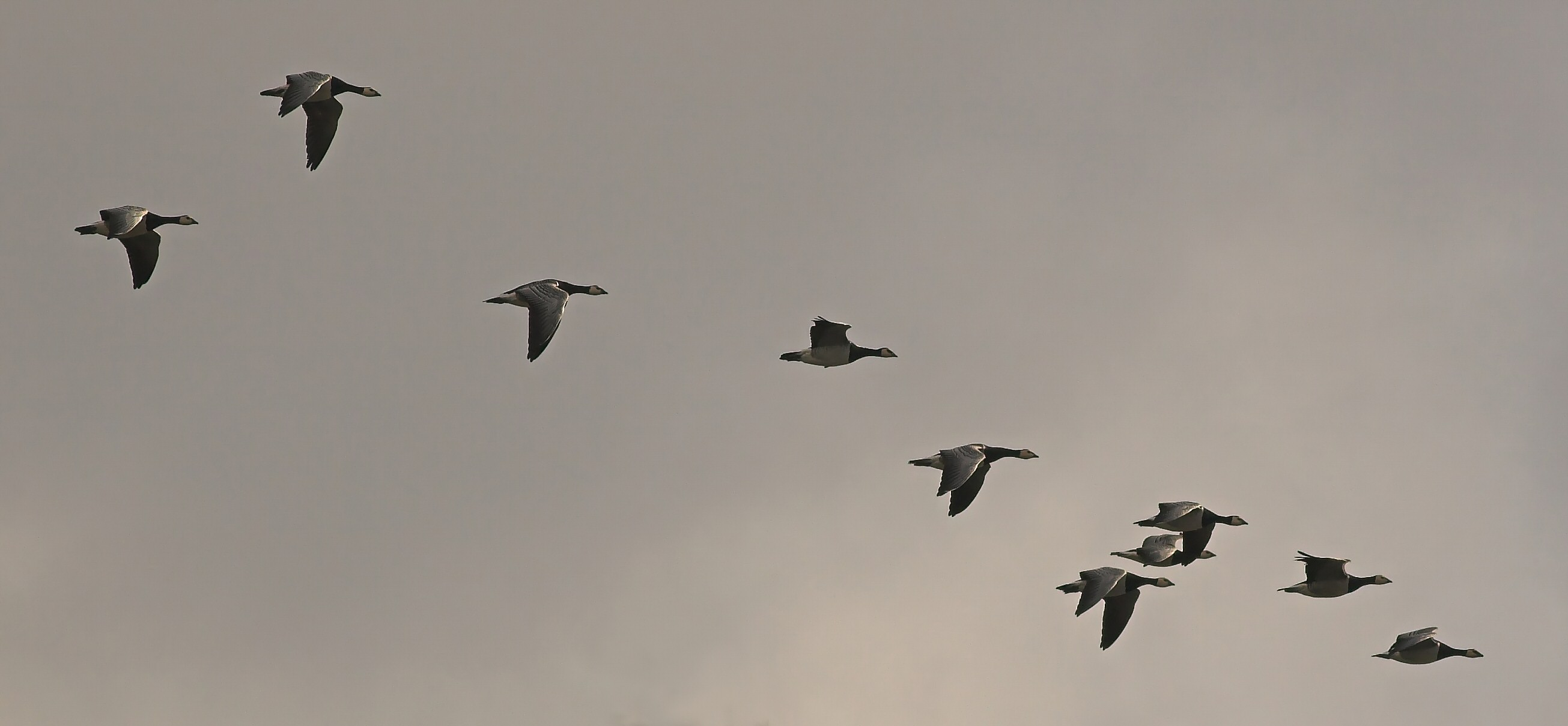
Flock of geese during autumn migration

A gireogi appa (Korean: 기러기 아빠; lit. 'goose dad') is a South Korean term that refers to a man who works in Korea while his wife and children stay in an English-speaking country such as the United States, Canada, the United Kingdom, Australia or New Zealand for the sake of their children's education.

Many Korean people desire to speak English well. This desire is sometimes referred to as "English fever". English proficiency is very important not only for students but also for office workers because they believe that English skills determine their social position and promotion in the company. However, it is not easy for Koreans to learn and speak English fluently due to the difference in sentence structure between Korean and English. To overcome this, some parents raise their young children in an anglophone country, as mothers stay with the children in the host country, while fathers live alone in Korea.

The term is inspired by the fact that geese are a species that migrate, just as gireogi appa fathers travel great distances to see their families. Estimates of the number of gireogi appa in South Korea range as high as 200,000 men. The word gireogi appa was included in the report '2002 New Word' by the National Institute of Korean Language.

== Related terms ==
If the gireogi appa has the means to frequently visits his family, he is called an "eagle dad" (독수리 아빠), but if his finances constrict his ability to travel abroad, he is known as a "penguin dad" (펭귄 아빠) because he cannot fly and may for long periods of not seeing his family.

If the man cannot afford to send his children abroad, and rents a small studio for his family in Gangnam (a district of Seoul dense with hagwon) the father is a "sparrow dad" (참새 아빠). If the man sends his children to elementary school in Daechi, he hires lodgings and is called a "Daejeon-dong dad" (대전동 아빠).

More than 40,000 South Korean schoolchildren are believed to be living in the United States, Canada, England, Australia, New Zealand, Malaysia, the Philippines, and Singapore expressly to increase English-speaking ability. As of 2009, over 100,000 Korean students were studying abroad. In at least some of the cases, a South Korean mother will choose to live abroad with her children for the secondary reason of avoiding her mother-in-law, with whom a historically stressful relationship may exist due to Korean Confucianism.

== See also ==
- Astronaut family
- Contemporary culture of South Korea
- Education in South Korea
- Flying geese paradigm
- Globalization
- Hagwon
- Kikokushijo
- Haigui
