= Kikokushijo =

Japanese expatriates who are partly or wholly educated outside of Japan

Kikokushijo (帰国子女; lit. '"returnee children"') and kaigaishijo (海外子女; lit. '"overseas children"') are Japanese-language terms referring to the children of Japanese expatriates who take part of their education outside Japan. The former term is used to refer to children who have returned to Japan, while the latter refers to such children while they are still overseas. They are referred to in English variously as "sojourn children" or "returnees". The term "third culture kids" is used by other countries.

== Prevalence ==
As of 2002, roughly 10,000 children of Japanese expatriates return to Japan every year, with a total of roughly 50,000 residing overseas at any one time, a number that had remained roughly constant during the previous decade after rapid growth in the 1970s and 1980s. Only 40% attend Japanese schools while living overseas.

== Challenges ==
The Japanese Ministry of Education recognised as early as 1966 that Japan's school system faced challenges in the education and re-integration of children who had returned from overseas. Under the idea of nihonjinron, which stressed the alleged uniqueness of Japanese society, kikokushijo began to be characterised in the 1970s as problem children who needed assistance in readjusting to Japanese society; they were thought to be too Westernised and individualistic. Much of the image of kikokushijo as "educational orphans" in need of "rescue" came from the parents of such children. During the 1980s, however, kikokushijo came to be seen as a new elite rather than as problems; their language and cultural skills gained respect as valuable tools for the internationalisation of Japan. As of 1997, over 300 universities offered relaxed admissions criteria for kikokushijo, a system which had been attacked as preferential treatment and reverse discrimination. They are often misperceived as fluent speakers of English, though many in fact resided in non-Anglophone countries.

== See also ==
- Gireogi appa – a South Korean term
- Haigui – Chinese term for graduate returnees
