= Shaheen Mistri =

Indian social activist and educator (born 1971)

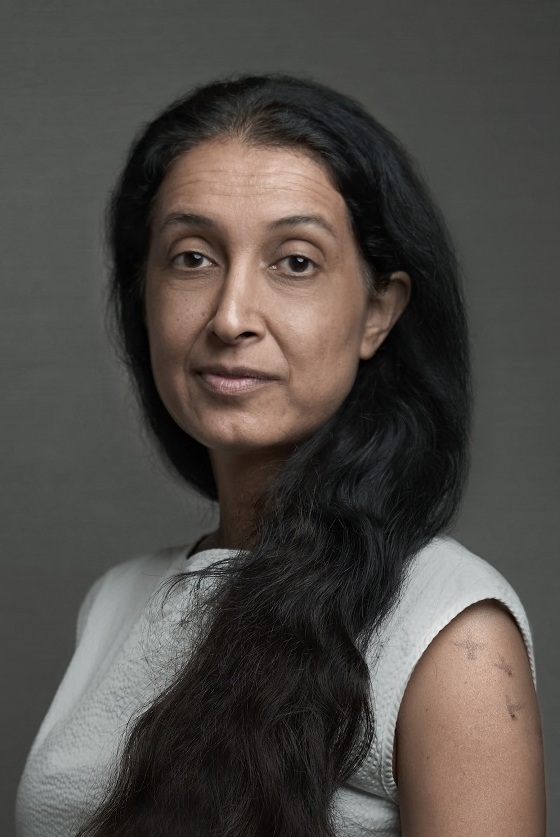
- Born: 16 March 1971 (age 55); Mumbai, India
- Education: BA, MA
- Alma mater: University of Mumbai, University of Manchester
- Occupations: CEO, Teach For India
- Known for: Akanksha Foundation & Teach For India
- Board member of: Akanksha Foundation; Simple Education Foundation; Teach for India
- Children: 2 daughters
- Website: http://www.teachforindia.org

Shaheen Mistri (born 16 March 1971) is an Indian social activist and educator known as the founder of Akanksha Foundation, and social activist, an Indian non-profit educational initiative in Mumbai and Pune, Occupation in CEO of Teach for India since 2008. Books Redrawing India, The Teach for India story, Miss Muglie Goes to Mumbai.

== Early life ==
Shaheen Mistri was born on 16 March 1971 in Mumbai, India, in She grew up in 5 different countries as she moved countries with her father, a senior banker with Citigroup. At the age of eighteen she returns to Mumbai keen to learn more about the city and its slums, when she decided to enroll at the University of Mumbai. Shaheen had always heard about inequalities in India’s education system, but what she saw shocked her. She graduated with a BA degree in Sociology from St. Xavier's College, University of Mumbai and later obtained a MA from the University of Manchester. Shaheen has been an Ashoka Fellow, a Global Leader for Tomorrow at the World Economic Forum, and an Asia Society 21 Leader. Shaheen is the author of the book, Re-drawing India.

== Career ==
Shaheen Mistri, as a young college student, walked into the Mumbai slums and expressed her desire to teach the less privileged children who roamed the streets. Shaheen founded the first Akanksha Center in 1989, enrolling 15 children and employing college friends as volunteers. It eventually evolved into the Akanksha Foundation, a non-profit education project that provided after-school tutoring to children from low-income. Today, Akanksha reaches out to over 6500 children through its School Project Model. The centers and schools are in Mumbai and Pune. Teachers teach children using an innovative methodology, which has won the foundation international honors.

In the summer of 2008, Shaheen founded Teach for India with the goal of providing equitable education to all Indian children. The Teach for India Fellowship enlists college graduates and young professionals to spend two years teaching in low-income schools to help bridge the country's the educational gap.

== Board memberships ==
Shaheen serves on the boards of Akanksha Foundation and Simple Education Foundation and is an ex-member of the board of Design for Change, the Thermax Foundation, and Teach for All.

== Published works ==
- Redrawing India: The Teach for India Story (2014)

== Awards ==
- Ashoka Fellow (2001)
- Global Leader for Tomorrow at the World Economic Forum (2002)
- Asia Society 21 Leader (2006)
