= Cultural Vistas =

U.S. nonprofit organization

- Founded: 1963
- Type: Nonprofit organization
- Location(s): New York City Washington, D.C. Berlin
- Website: culturalvistas.org

Cultural Vistas is a nonprofit 501(c)(3) organization that facilitates internships and professional exchange programs and services for visitors coming to the U.S., and American students and professionals seeking experiential learning opportunities abroad. The organization is headquartered in New York City, with regional offices located in Berlin and Washington, D.C.

Cultural Vistas annually serves nearly 6,000 students, professionals, and emerging leaders through career-focused international internships, educational study tours, language immersion and cultural exchange programs in the United States and around the world.

In 2024, it was designated as an "undesirable organization" by the Russian authorities.

== Mission ==
To enrich minds, advance global skills, build careers, and connect lives through international exchange.

== Programs ==
Cultural Vistas sponsors and administers a variety of inbound (to the U.S.) and outbound (from the U.S.) exchange programs, experiential learning opportunities, and professional fellowships. The organization is designated by the United States Department of State as an Exchange Visitor Program sponsor for the Intern, Trainee, and Teacher categories of the J-1 visa. It also sponsors and facilitates internship placement and work abroad opportunities for U.S.-based individuals in Asia, Europe and South America. In 2014, Cultural Vistas administered professional exchange programs for 5,720 students and young professionals from 136 different countries.

- Alfa Fellowship Program
- Robert Bosch Foundation Fellowship Program
- Congress-Bundestag Youth Exchange
- Cultural Vistas Fellowship
- Edmund S. Muskie Internship Program
- International Visitor Leadership Program
- IAESTE United States
- Internships Abroad
- Émigré Memorial German Internship Program–German State Parliaments (EMGIP)
- Korea WEST
- Young Southeast Asian Leaders Initiative

== Organizational history ==
The organization was officially incorporated as a nonprofit in 1963. In January 2011, Cultural Vistas was formed after a nonprofit merger between two longstanding exchange organizations: the Association for International Practical Training (AIPT) and CDS International.

AIPT
In 1948, Massachusetts Institute of Technology (MIT) President, Dr. Karl Compton, MIT board of trustees, and Earl Eames, a graduating senior in chemical engineering, active in student government, sought ways in which the institute could join the international cooperative undertaking to rebuild war-torn Europe. As a result of their effort, they formed the U.S. chapter of the newly created International Association for the Exchange of Students for Technical Experience (IAESTE-US). Two years later in 1950, their first exchange programs occurred when they sent 37 American students to apply their engineering skills in jobs abroad, while American employers welcomed 30 foreign trainees to complete short-term training assignments in the United States. Students and participating employers soon found the effort extremely valuable in many dimensions: as an excellent tool of public diplomacy, as a new way for forward-thinking corporations to identify talent and form an international workforce. By 1980, the organization grew beyond the technical fields and established professional programs, becoming AIPT.

AIPT was known for its positive workplace culture and low employee turnover with employees spending close to nine years with the organization on average. Karen Krug, AIPT’s CFO set the record with 32 years of service (1980–2012) followed by its CEO, Elizabeth Chazottes, with 25 years (1987–2011).

CDS International
In the 1920s, Carl Duisberg, CEO of Bayer AG in Germany, initiated the first transatlantic work-study programs between the United States and Germany with the help of the Deutsche Studentenwerke's (German Student Association) New York City office. As hoped, program alumni rose to prominent positions following World War II at leading firms such as AEG, Bayer, Bosch, Daimler-Benz, and Siemens, by introducing in Germany the mass production methods and business practices learned in the United States. The alumni from these initial exchanges founded the Carl Duisberg Gesellschaft (CDG) in 1949 to help engineers, businessmen, and farmers gain international work experience necessary for rebuilding post-war Germany and Europe. In 1968, the Carl Duisberg Society was founded in New York City as a non-profit organization designed to rekindle Duisberg's original exchanges and to facilitate international career training opportunities for Americans and Germans. The name was officially changed to CDS International in 1987 to reflect the organization's increasingly international nature of its programs beyond Germany to include partners in other European countries, Asia and Latin America

CDS was known for its high quality programming, strong alumni network and collegial company culture. Wolfgang Linz served as its longest-tenured Executive Director (22 years), Robert Fenstermacher as his successor (16 years), with Linda Boughton as its COO/CFO (33 years).
