= Christian Vater (social entrepreneur) =

German bank teller

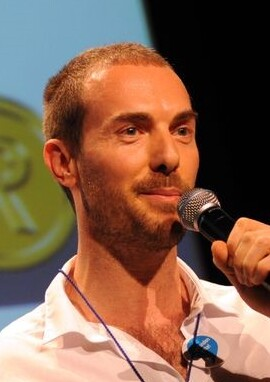
- Christian Vater (social entrepreneur), founder of the fundraising campaign Deutschland rundet auf
- Born: November 15, 1974 (age 51); Berlin, Germany
- Occupation: Social entrepreneur

Christian Vater (born November 15, 1974) is the founder of the independent German charitable foundation Deutschland rundet auf (Germany rounds up). Born in Berlin, Vater is a social entrepreneur since 2009. Previously, he worked as a music manager.

== Career ==
His father was a physician, his mother is a pharmacist. He is a banker by profession, and holds a degree in economics and international management from European Business School London (EBS London). In 1998 Vater started as a manager in the music industry, working consequently in various national and international positions, at Bertelsmann Music Group (BMG), the tour promoter DEAG Deutsche Entertainment, in the United Kingdom at EMI, as well as IE Music, the artist management of Robbie Williams. In December 2007, after the birth of his first child, Christian Vater decided to become a social entrepreneur. In 2008 he co-founded the Ana Kwa Ana Foundation with a focus on improving the livelihoods of HIV-infected street children in Africa. In 2009 he founded Deutschland rundet auf. In 2015 he founded the social startup my better life. Since 2015 he works as a coach for personal development.

== Deutschland rundet auf ==
The fundraising campaign Deutschland rundet auf was founded on November 30, 2009, with the aim to eliminate child poverty in Germany. Consumers can round up their shopping bills to the next 10-cent amount by saying "Aufrunden bitte!" ("Round it up, please!"). Each cent donated goes directly and without any deductions to independently selected and controlled projects to fight child poverty in Germany. More than 4.3 million Euro have been raised as of December 2015. A survey by market research firm IfD Allensbach showed, that after three years in operation, 69% of the German population know Deutschland rundet auf.

== Awards ==
For his idea of the micro-donation by rounding up, Vater was named an Ashoka fellow and inducted into Ashoka's global network of social entrepreneurs. He has further been recognised with the Best Human Brands Award 2012, the VisionAward 2013, and acknowledged as a "responsible leader" by the BMW Stiftung Herbert Quandt in 2014.
