= Defy Ventures =

American nonprofit organization

- Founded: 2010
- Type: Non-governmental organization
- Purpose: Ending recidivism and mass incarceration
- Location: New York City, United States
- Region served: United States
- Method: Entrepreneurship, employment, and leadership training
- Key people: CEO and President: Andrew Glazier
- Website: defyventures.org

Defy Ventures is a United States-based 501(c)(3) nonprofit organization that tries to solve the social problems caused by incarceration. The organization provides training programs to individuals with criminal histories, as a way of reducing recidivism. The organization was founded in 2010.

== History ==
Defy Ventures was founded in October 2010 in New York City by Catherine Hoke (née Rohr's). In January 2012, it launched its first group of program participants, called entrepreneurs-in-training (EITs). Enrollment to women was opened later the same year.

In July 2015, Defy launched its "CEO of Your New Life" program, which teaches job readiness and a variety of personal development skills to incarcerated men and women. The program also provides follow-up, with post-release job placement, entrepreneurship startup funding, and mentoring.

As of 2015, over 100 companies have been started by Defy's EITs and over 3,000 businesspeople have become involved as volunteers, judges and mentors for EITs.

The program was expanded to the Bay Area in 201,5 to Southern California in 2016, and to Connecticut and Colorado in 2017. The organization offers programming through both chapters and independent affiliates (under license) in California, Colorado, Washington State, New York, Connecticut, and Illinois.

== Programs ==
Defy offers a variety of face-to-face and video courses consisting of well-being, entrepreneurship training, personal development, mentoring, business incubation, financing opportunities, and network development. This includes career and reentry support, with skills-based workshops, community building activities, and service activities. Post release services include a 14-week entrepreneurship course, and advanced coursework in entrepreneurship and business management. Graduates can participate in an accelerator to pitch for seed capital.

== See also ==
- Social entrepreneurship
- United States incarceration rate
