= Teach For India =

NGO that recruits college graduates as full-time teachers in low-income schools

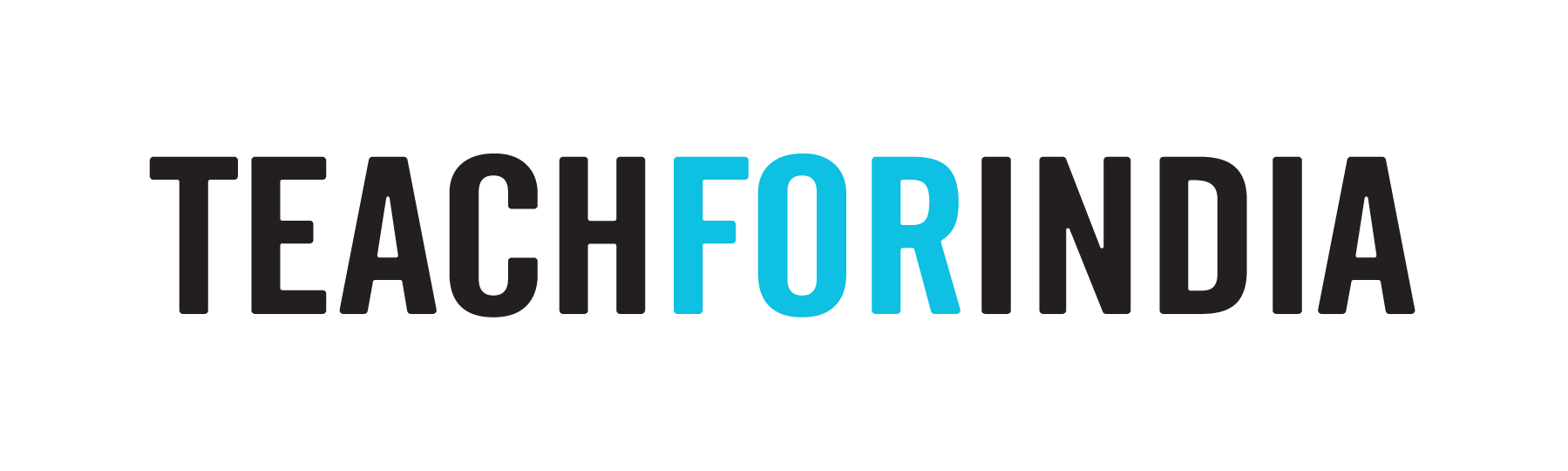
- Founded: 2009
- Type: Education, Nonprofit organisation
- Purpose: Eliminating Educational Inequity in India
- Location: Mumbai, India
- Region served: New Delhi, Mumbai, Pune, Chennai, Hyderabad, Ahmedabad, Bangalore and Kolkata
- Key people: Shaheen Mistri - Founder & Chief Executive Officer
- Website: www.teachforindia.org

Teach For India (TFI) is a non-profit founded by Shaheen Mistri in 2009. It is a part of the Teach For All network. Teach For India runs a two-year Fellowship and supports an Alumni movement. The Fellowship recruits college graduates and working professionals to serve as full-time teachers in low-income schools for two years. The mission of Teach For India is “one day all children will attain an excellent education.”

Teach For India has built a national focus on repairing India's educational crisis through their Innovation Cell programs that equip teachers, students, and entrepreneurs to spark long-term change in education. Through social and print media- Teach For India has garnered the support of thousands of people from a wide range of sectors.

== Academic Impact ==
Teach For India has graduated 3 cohorts of 5,200 students from 10th grade in Mumbai, Pune, and Delhi till 2019 with a graduation rate that is consistently better than the Government schools’ average. Their 4th cohort graduated in 2020 with a passing rate of 94-98% across these three cities Mumbai, Pune, and Delhi.
