= Haigui =

Chinese term for returning study abroad students

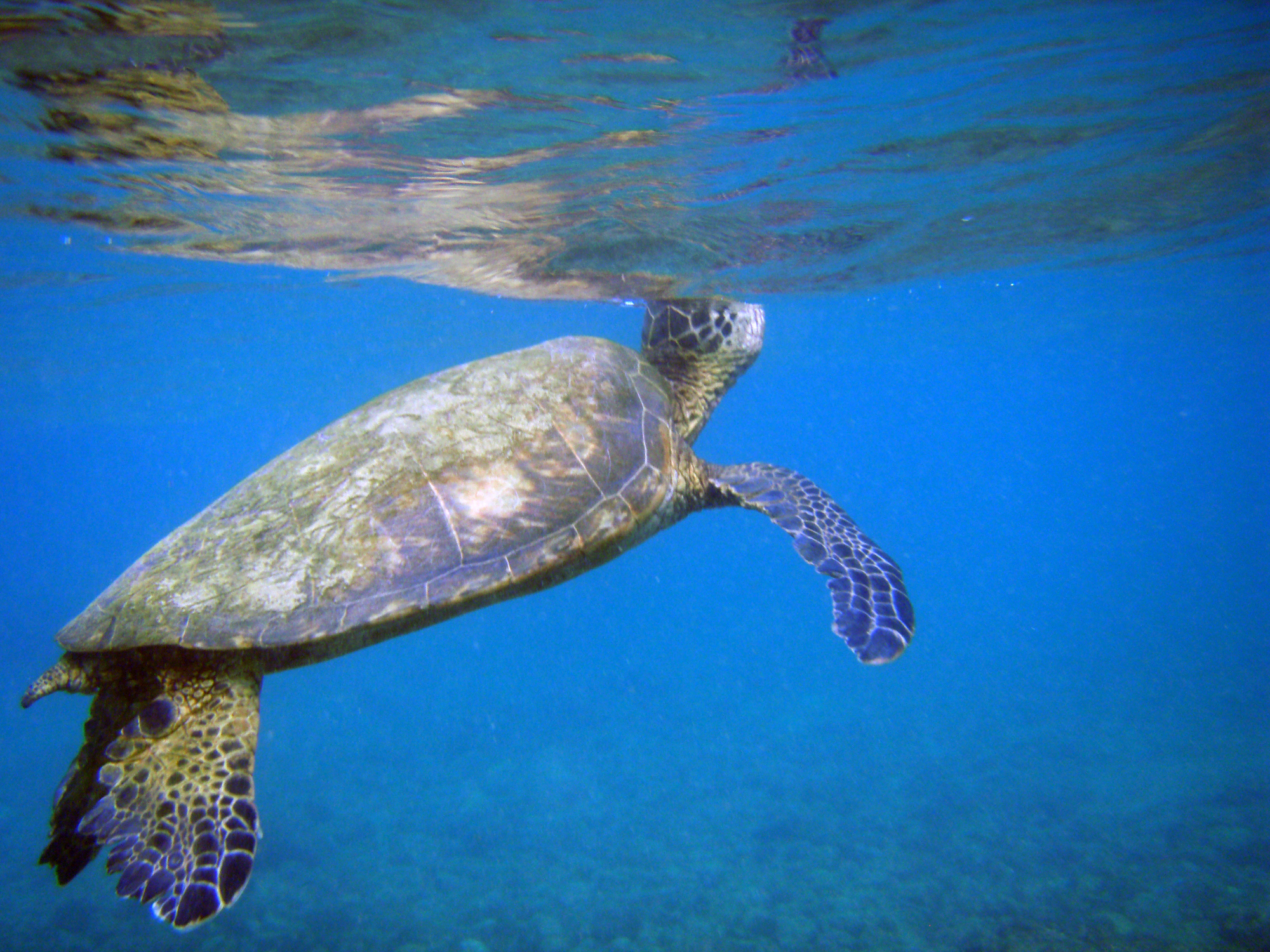
"Sea turtle" in Chinese (海龟; 海龜) is a homophone of the term for a student returned from study overseas

Haigui (simplified Chinese: 海归; traditional Chinese: 海歸; pinyin: hǎiguī) is a Chinese language slang term for Chinese nationals who have returned to mainland China after having studied abroad. The term is a pun on the homophonic hǎiguī (simplified Chinese: 海龟; traditional Chinese: 海龜) meaning "sea turtle".

Graduates from foreign universities used to be highly sought out by employers in China. A 2017 study found that haigui are now less likely to receive a callback from potential employers compared to Chinese students with a Chinese degree. Possible causes of this reversal include the rising quality of Chinese education institutions and the high salary demands of haigui.

Over 800,000 recently graduated haigui returned to China in 2020, an increase of 70% from 2019, largely due to the impact of the COVID-19 pandemic.

== Motivations ==
In 1950s, Sukarno government passed the Presidential Regulation 10 of 1959 which prohibits Chinese Indonesians into doing business in rural areas. The decision caused diplomatic tension between People's Republic of China and Indonesia and caused ambassador to Indonesia Huang Chen to urge Indonesian government to review the regulations. Toward the end of 1959, Peking Radio announced a campaign for ethnic Chinese to return to "The Warmth of Motherland". 199,000 Chinese Indonesians have said to applied for repatriation but only 102,000 people that have been repatriated.

In aftermath of 1967 anti-Chinese riots in Burma, tens of thousands of Chinese Burmese had left Burma for China due to safety concern among Chinese community staying in Burma.

Some haigui have returned to China due to the late-2000s recession in the U.S. and Europe. According to Chinese government statistics in 2019, 86.3% of the 6.5 million Chinese people who have gone abroad to study in the past 40 years have returned. According to the Higher Education Policy Institute, in 2023, 84% of Chinese graduates in the United Kingdom returned to China after finishing their studies.

== Etymology and history ==
The word is a pun, as hai 海 means "ocean" and gui 龟; 龜 is a homophone of gui 归; 歸 meaning "to return". The name was first used by Ren Hong, a young man returning to China as a graduate of Yale University seven years after leaving aboard a tea freighter from Guangzhou to the United States.

== Notable haigui ==
- Sun Yat-Sen, first president of the Republic of China
- Zhou Enlai, first premier and foreign minister of the People's Republic of China
- Tang Xianhu, badminton player and coach
- Deng Xiaoping, elder of the Chinese Communist Party
- Qian Xuesen, father of the Chinese rocket program
- Sutanto Djuhar, businessman
- Loletta Chu, model
- Wong Kwok-hing, politician
- Sum Nung, martial artist
- Hsiao Bi-khim, Vice President of the Republic of China

== See also ==
- Gireogi appa
- Kikokushijo
- Daigou
