= Ann Cotton =

Welsh entrepreneur (born 1950)

Ann Lesley Cotton OBE
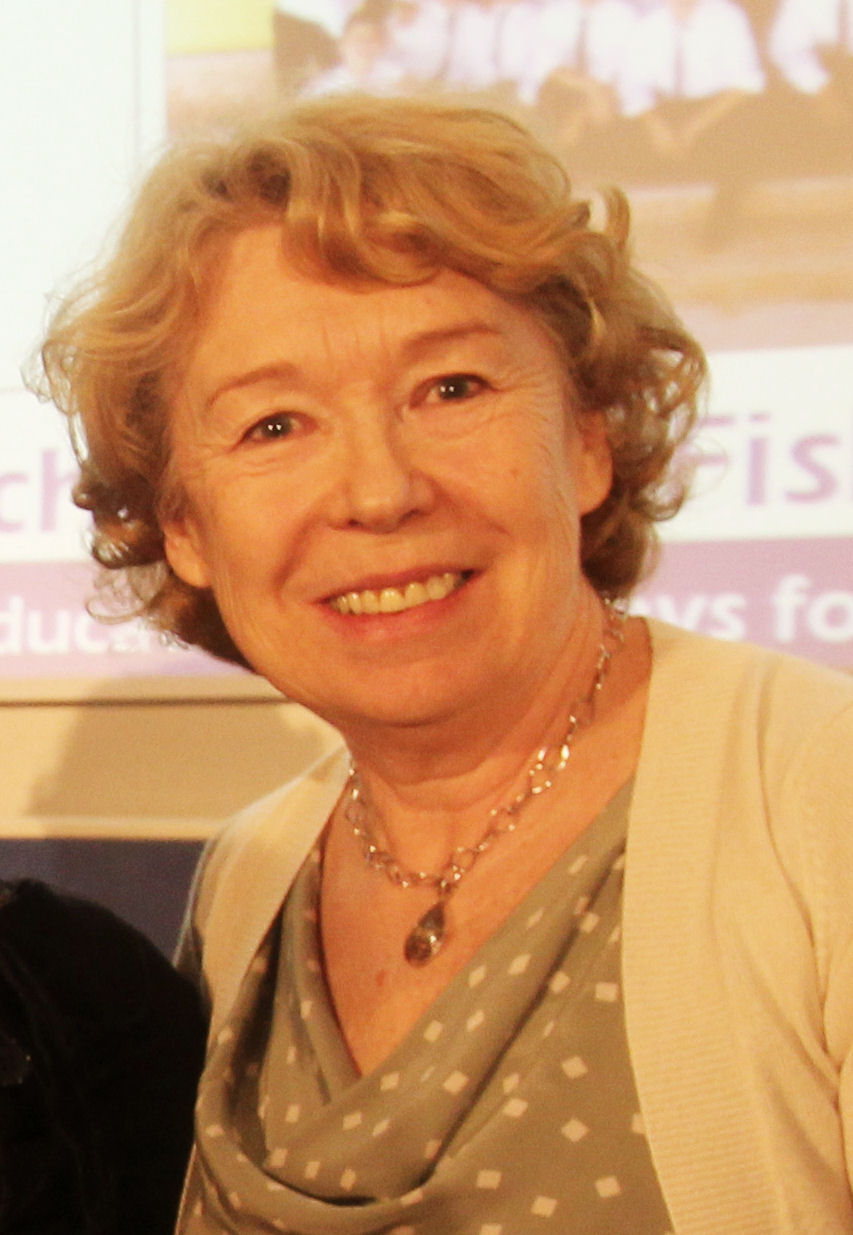
- Ann Lesley Cotton
- Born: Ann Lesley Cotton; 1950 (age 75–76); Cardiff, Wales
- Known for: Teacher and social entrepreneur
- Awards: 2004 Social Entrepreneur of the Year for the UK; Honorary Fellow of the Open University; 2005 Beacon Prize winner; 2005 Skoll Award for Social Entrepreneurship; 2006 OBE in the Queen's New Year Honours List; 2007 Honorary Doctorate in Law, University of Cambridge; 2014 GDST Alumna of the Year Award; 2014 WISE Prize for Education; 2015 Ahimsa Award by Institute of Jainology

Ann Lesley Cotton OBE (born 1950) is a Welsh entrepreneur and philanthropist who was appointed an Order of the British Empire (OBE) in the 2006 Queen's New Year Honours List. The honour was in recognition of her services to education of young women in rural Africa as the founder of Camfed.

== Camfed Innovation and Activities ==
Camfed's goal is to replace the existing cycle of poverty and inequality with a new cycle of empowerment and opportunity. The organisation's approach is to not only support girls and young women through school, but also on to new lives as entrepreneurs and community leaders. To complete the "virtuous cycle", graduating students become CAMA alumnae, many of whom return to school to train and mentor new generations of students. Camfed started out by supporting 32 girls through school in Zimbabwe in 1993. Since then it has expanded across 2,295 communities in five sub-Saharan countries. Over the past 17 years, 1,065,710 young people directly benefited from Camfed's programmes in Ghana, Malawi, Tanzania, Zambia and Zimbabwe. More than 3 million children have already benefited from Camfed's programmes in a network of 5,085 partner school

Camfed won the International Aid and Development Charity of the Year award in 2003. In 2014, Camfed was recognised by the Organisation for Economic Co-operation and Development (OECD) for best practice in taking development innovation to scale.

== Background ==
Cotton was born in Cardiff, Wales, and was educated at Howell's School, Llandaff. For more than three decades, Cotton has been focused on improving opportunity for children at the margins of education. She began her career in a London school by establishing one of the first centres for girls excluded from mainstream education. Cotton's commitment to girls' education in Africa began in 1991, when she went on a research trip to Zimbabwe to investigate why girls' school enrolment in rural areas was so low. Contrary to the common assumption that families weren't sending girls to school for cultural reasons, Cotton discovered that poverty was the main roadblock. Families could not afford to buy books or pay school fees for all their children. Instead, they had to choose which children would receive an education. Since boys had a better chance of getting a paid job after graduation, daughters were rarely selected.

Cotton knew that educated girls were less likely to contract HIV/AIDS, would marry later, have fewer and healthier children, and would support the next generation to go to school. She understood that poverty and exclusion affects girls both psychologically and economically, and that if girls could be educated, supported by their communities, and empowered to shape their own destinies, they could change their communities and nations forever. In 1993, after grassroots fundraising that supported the first 32 girls through school in Zimbabwe, Cotton founded Camfed. The reach of the organisation's innovative education programmes has grown ever since. In 2013 alone, Camfed directly supported more than 434,000 children to go to school.

One of the results of Camfed's work is CAMA, a pan-African network of Camfed graduates with 314,410 members. CAMA alumnae design and deliver extended programs to students and communities, including health and financial literacy training. Each CAMA member supports the education of another two to three children outside of her own family. Over Camfed's two decades, this approach has been proven to work both within rural communities, and at a larger scale across countries.

== Residencies, platforms and awards ==
Cotton is an honorary fellow at Homerton College, Cambridge, and Social Entrepreneur in Residence at the Cambridge University Judge Business School. She is a noted speaker on international platforms, including the World Economic Forum, the Clinton Global Initiative and the Skoll World Forum. In 2014 she addressed the US-Africa Summit hosted by The White House, George W. Bush Institute and US State Department.

Cotton has won numerous awards for her work, including an honorary doctorate in law from the University of Cambridge; being appointed an OBE in 2006 in honour of her advocacy of girls' education in Africa; the Skoll Award for Social Entrepreneurship; Woman of the Year in the UK; and UK Social Entrepreneur of the Year. In November 2014, Cotton was awarded the WISE Prize for Education, becoming the fourth WISE laureate alongside Vicky Colbert, founder of Escuela Nueva in Colombia, Dr Madhav Chavan, co-founder of Pratham in India, and Sir Fazle Hasan Abed, founder of BRAC in Bangladesh.
