= Ndèye Saly Diop Dieng =

Senegalese politician

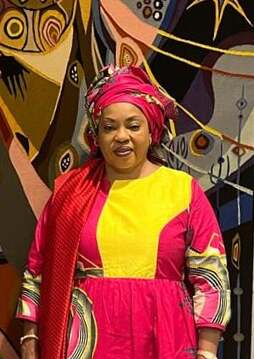

Minister of Women, Family, Gender and Child Protection
- In office 2017–2020
- Appointed by: Macky Sall
- Succeeded by: Mariama Sarr

Personal details
- Occupation: Electrical engineer

Ndèye Saly Diop Dieng is a Senegalese politician and the former Minister of Women, Family, Gender and Child Protection.

== Education ==
Dieng obtained her baccalaureate from John Fitzgerald Kennedy High School and her higher degree at the École supérieure polytechnique de Dakar in Dakar.

== Career ==
Before her political appointment, Dieng worked at the Senegalese National Electrical Company, where she held administrative positions between 1980 and 2011.

== Political career ==
In 2011, Dieng was appointed as the leader of Alliance for the Republic (APR). Dieng was appointed by the former president of Senegal, Macky Sall, as the minister for Women, Family, Gender and Child Protection from 2017 to 2020.

== Legal issues ==
In 2025, Dieng was placed under court's supervision in connection with the misappropriation of 52 million CFA francs of COVID-19 funds. She was cleared of the charges by the High Court of Justice.
