= Michelene Chi =

Cognitive scientist

- Education: Carnegie Mellon University
- Spouses: William G. Chase (d. 1983); Kurt VanLehn
- Awards: E. L. Thorndike Award (2015); Rumelhart Prize (2019); Yidan Prize for Education Research (2023)
- Scientific career
- Fields: Cognitive science
- Workplaces: Arizona State University
- Thesis: The Development of Short-term Memory Capacity (1975)
- Doctoral advisor: David Klahr

Michelene (Micki) T. H. Chi is a cognitive and learning scientist known for her work on the development of expertise, benefits of self-explanations, and active learning in the classroom. Chi is the Regents Professor, Dorothy Bray Endowed Professor of Science and Teaching at Arizona State University, where she directs the Learning and Cognition Lab.

== Awards ==
Chi received the 2019 David E. Rumelhart Prize for significant theoretical contributions to human cognition. Her award citation emphasizes how Chi challenged basic assumptions about the human mind and developed new approaches that have shaped a generation of cognitive and learning scientists.

Other awards include the 1982 Boyd McCandless Award from the American Psychological Association for early career contributions to developmental psychology and the 2013 Sylvia Scribner Award from the American Educational Research Association (AERA) for research in the field of learning and instruction. Chi received 2015 E. L. Thorndike Award from the American Psychological Association for lifetime research contributions and the 2016 AERA Distinguished Contributions to Research in Education Award.

Chi was awarded the 2023 Yidan Prize for Education Research. The prize consists of a gold medal, a cash award of HK$15 million and a project fund of HK$15 million.

== Biography ==
Chi received her Bachelor of Science degree in mathematics at Carnegie-Mellon University in 1970. She then obtained her PhD in psychology in 1975 from the same university. Her dissertation titled The Development of Short-term Memory Capacity was supervised by David Klahr. Chi completed a post doctoral fellowship at the Learning Research and Development Center of the University of Pittsburgh (1975–1977), supervised by Robert Glaser.

Chi held research and faculty positions at the University of Pittsburgh before joining the faculty of Arizona State University in 2008. Chi's research has been supported by numerous grants from organizations including the National Science Foundation, the Institute of Education Sciences and the Spencer Foundation.

Chi is married to Kurt VanLehn, the Diane and Gary Tooker Chair for Effective Education in Science, Technology, Engineering and Math in the Ira A. Fulton Schools of Engineering at Arizona State University. VanLehn's research focuses on intelligent tutoring systems, classroom orchestration systems, and other intelligent interactive instructional technology. Chi and VanLehn have a son, Reid Van Lehn, who is a member of the Faculty in the Department of Chemical and Biological Engineering at the University of Wisconsin-Madison.

Her first husband was William G. Chase, a Professor of Psychology at Carnegie-Mellon University who died on December 16, 1983. Chi and Chase had two daughters together, Michelle and Catherine Chase. Michelle Chase is a historian of modern Latin America, specializing in twentieth-century Cuba and a member of the Faculty of Pace University. Catherine Chase is a cognitive scientist who studies learning of STEM subjects in K-16 students; she is a member of the Faculty of Education at Teachers College, Columbia University.

Chi is a member of the American Academy of Arts and Sciences and the National Academy of Education.

== Research ==
Chi's research focuses on active learning and student engagement in STEM subjects. Her research team has explored numerous factors associated with student learning, including benefits of self-explanations, human tutoring, and watching videos of student-teacher dialogues. Chi and her colleagues have proposed that children have difficulties learning scientific concepts due to a lack of reference to these concepts within their daily lives. Scientific material is hard to grasp because the material learned in the classroom does not normally relate to the daily events, phenomena, and environments children use to understand causality.

Chi developed a theoretical framework for active learning called ICAP which defines and categorizes student engagement behaviors towards educational material into four modes: Interactive, generative / Constructive, manipulative / Active, attentive / Passive. According to this framework, as students' engagement with learning materials moves from passive to active to constructive to interactive, their learning will also increase. Chi's paper Why students learn more from dialogue- than monologue-videos: Analyses of peer interactions (written with co-authors Seokmin Kang and David Yaghmourian) was awarded Best Paper published in Journal of the Learning Sciences Award by International Society of the Learning Sciences in 2017. This paper used the ICAP framework as means of understanding why students learn more from watching tutorial dialogue-videos than lecture-style monologue-videos.

Chi has co-edited several books including The Nature of Expertise (with Robert Glaser and Marshall Farr), Trends in Memory Development Research (with Larry Nucci), and the Handbook of Applied Cognition (with Francis Durso, Raymond Nickerson, Roger Schvaneveldt, Susan Dumais and Stephen Linsday).

Among Chi's notable students are James Slotta, Rod Roscoe, Muhsin Menekse, Heisawn Jeong, and Jeffrey Sampler.

== Representative publications ==
- Chi, M. T., Feltovich, P. J., & Glaser, R. (1981). Categorization and representation of physics problems by experts and novices. Cognitive Science, 5(2), 121–152.
- Chi, M. T., Bassok, M., Lewis, M. W., Reimann, P., & Glaser, R. (1989). Self-explanations: How students study and use examples in learning to solve problems. Cognitive Science, 13(2), 145–182.
- Chi, M. T., De Leeuw, N., Chiu, M. H., & LaVancher, C. (1994). Eliciting self-explanations improves understanding. Cognitive Science, 18(3), 439–477.
- Chi, M. T., Slotta, J. D., & De Leeuw, N. (1994). From things to processes: A theory of conceptual change for learning science concepts. Learning and Instruction, 4(1), 27-43.
- Chi, M. T., Siler, S. A., Jeong, H., Yamauchi, T., & Hausmann, R. G. (2001). Learning from human tutoring. Cognitive Science, 25(4), 471–533.
- Roscoe, R. D., & Chi, M. T. (2007). Understanding tutor learning: Knowledge-building and knowledge-telling in peer tutors’ explanations and questions. Review of Educational Research, 77(4), 534-574.
- Chi, M. T. (2009). Active‐constructive‐interactive: A conceptual framework for differentiating learning activities. Topics in Cognitive Science, 1(1), 73-105.
- Menekse, M., Stump, G. S., Krause, S., & Chi, M. T. (2013). Differentiated overt learning activities for effective instruction in engineering classrooms. Journal of Engineering Education, 102(3), 346-374.
- Chi, M. T., & Wylie, R. (2014). The ICAP framework: Linking cognitive engagement to active learning outcomes. Educational Psychologist, 49(4), 219–243.
