= Lucy Lake =

British female education activist (born 1972)

Lucy Lake OBE (born 3 August 1972) is a leader in the field of female education and Chief Executive of CAMFED (Campaign for Female Education).

== Education ==
Lake studied Human Sciences at Wadham College, University of Oxford (1991).

== Career ==
Lake joined CAMFED in 1994 shortly after it was founded in Zimbabwe. She then led the development of its programs in support of girls' education across the region. Lake took on the role of CEO of CAMFED in 2012. In 2017, she appointed Angeline Murimirwa, one of the first women to have completed her education with CAMFED's support, as Co-Executive to underline the importance of ensuring those who were once marginalised move centre stage as leaders. This move has received acclaim as an example of good governance in international development, including from Julia Gillard.

Lake was a founding member and co-chair of the United Nations Girls' Education Initiative. She served on the High-Level Steering Group of the Global Education Commission's Workforce Initiative (2017–2020) and is on the advisory board of the UNESCO Global Education Monitoring Report.

In 1998, Lake worked with the first group of young women who had graduated from school with CAMFED's support to set up its alumni, the CAMFED Association. By 2021, the Association had grown to 178,000 women leaders in sub-Saharan Africa, many of whom are now in prominent public positions. A hallmark of the Association is the commitment of its membership to support the younger generation of girls to go to school. Each member is financially supporting an average five other students in her community through education, a multiplier that was described by Nick Kristof in the New York Times as "a perpetual motion machine".

== Honours and awards ==
In 2020, Lake was awarded the Yidan Prize for Education Development the world's largest education prize, alongside Murimirwa. She was appointed an Officer of the Order of the British Empire (OBE) in the 2019 New Year's Honours for "services to young people in Africa".

Under Lake's tenure, CAMFED has been awarded the Hilton Humanitarian Prize and the Princess of Asturias Award for International Cooperation (2021). It has also been the recipient of a UN Global Climate Action Award and has been recognised by the OECD DAC for best practice in taking development innovation to scale.
