= École supérieure polytechnique de Dakar =

Public engineering school in Senegal

École supérieure polytechnique
- Institut universitaire de technologie
- Type: Public university
- Established: 1964
- Affiliations: RESCIF
- Director: Papa Alioune Sarr Ndiaye
- Director of Studies: Ibrahima Fall
- Students: 17,000
- Location: Dakar, Senegal; 14.6810°N 17.4664°W
- Website: esp.sn

The École supérieure polytechnique de Dakar (ESP), also known as the Higher Polytechnic School of Dakar, is a professional training institution under the supervision of the Ministry of Higher Education of Senegal. It was founded in May 1964. It is affiliated with Cheikh Anta Diop University (UCAD) in Dakar but has legal personality and financial autonomy. ESP Dakar is one of the most significant engineering schools in Senegal and West Africa. It trains senior technicians and engineers in the fields of science, technology, and management.

ESP comprises six departments (computer engineering, electrical engineering, mechanical engineering, civil engineering, chemical engineering, and applied biology) as well as a department of management science and various research laboratories.

== History ==
Since its inception, the Higher Polytechnic School of Dakar has been a center of excellence for training students from Senegal, the sub-region, and beyond.

The Polytechnic Institute (IP), founded in May 1964, became the University Institute of Technology (IUT) in November 1967. On 30 April 1973, law 73-17 and decree 73-387 were enacted, making the IUT a public institution with legal personality and financial autonomy within the University of Dakar.

In the 1973–1974 academic year, the National School of Public Works and Buildings (ENTPB), which trained technical agents for the Ministry of Equipment, was integrated into the IUT's civil engineering department. In the same year, other reforms allowed the IUT to offer courses in business and administration.

These additional programs led to the awarding of the Technologist Engineer Diploma (DIT) and the Higher Diploma in Business and Administration Studies (DESCAE). In 1974, the IUT became the National Higher University School of Technology (ENSUT).

On 24 November 1994, law No. 94-78 transformed it into the Higher Polytechnic School (ESP) with two centers: Dakar and Thiès. It included ENSUT, the École polytechnique de Thiès (EPT), and the industrial section of the Normal School of Technical and Professional Education (ENSETP). At the same time, it separated from its tertiary division, which became the Higher Institute of Management (ISG) and was affiliated with the Faculty of Economics and Management Sciences (FASEG).

ENSETP was reconstituted in 2005, reclaiming its industrial part that was within ESP. The former Management Department of the former ENSUT, now the Higher Institute of Management affiliated with FASEG, returned to ESP in 2006.

In 2007, the former Thiès Center of the Higher Polytechnic School (formerly EPT) became the École polytechnique de Thiès, affiliated with the University of Thiès and later directly with the Ministry of Higher Education.

== Notable former students ==
- Ndèye Saly Diop Dieng, politician

== See also ==
- Education in Senegal
