= Yidan Prize =

Education research and development award

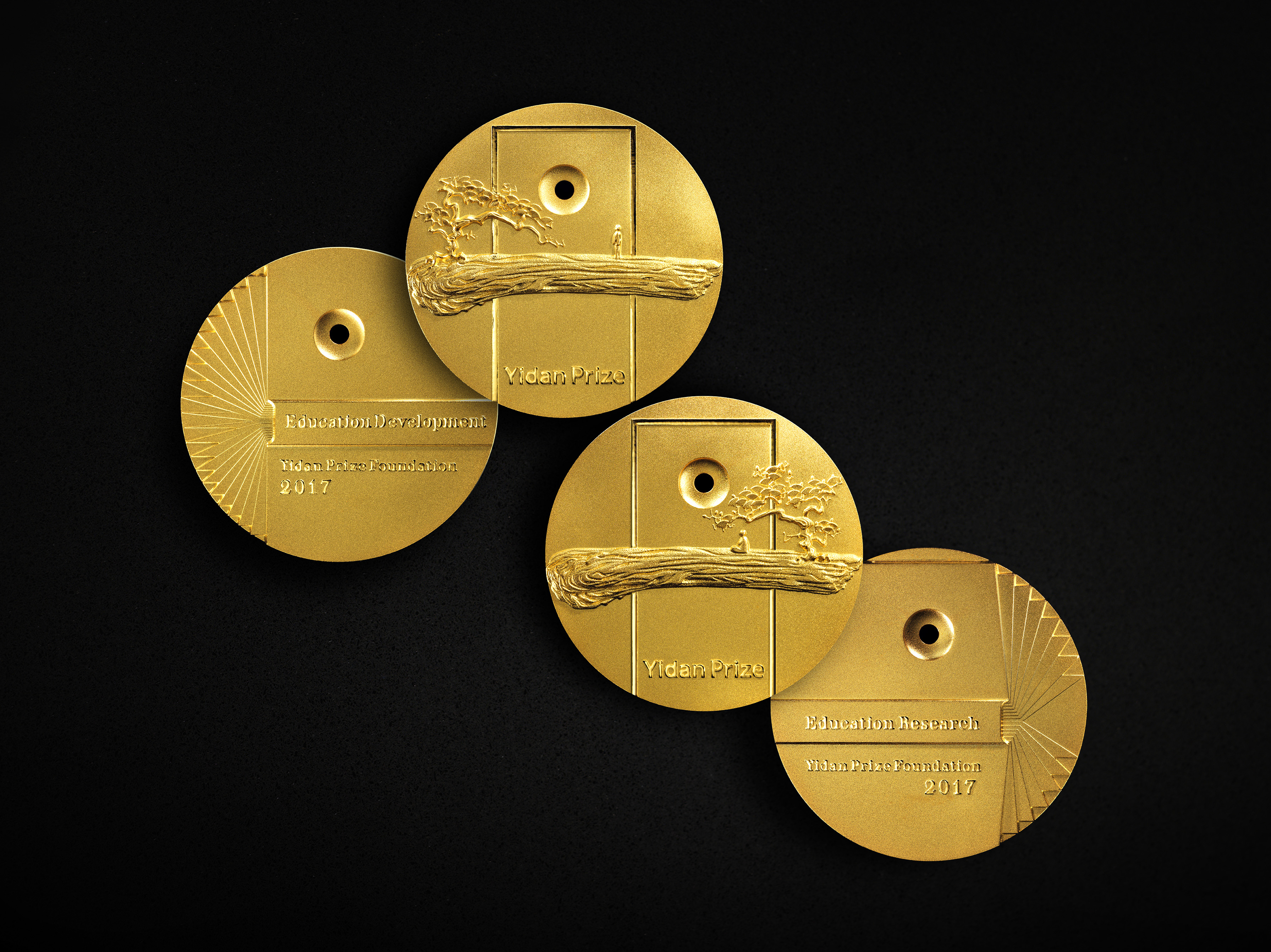
- Yidan Prize medals
- Awarded for: Contributions to education research and development
- Country: Global
- Obverse: A human figure and a pine tree growing from a mountain rock, with the words "Yidan Prize"
- Reverse: The words "Education Research" or "Education Development", the winner's name and the year
- First award: 2017

Highlights
- Total: 16
- Total recipients: 19
- Website: yidanprize.org

The Yidan Prize (/i:dan/) is an annual award founded in 2016 by Chen Yidan for "contributions to education research and development". The prize is financed and governed by a HK$2.5 billion (about US$320 million) independent trust. It is a global, inclusive education award which recognizes changemakers who inspire progress in education for a better world, and has been referred to as the largest education prize on Earth.

== Prizes ==
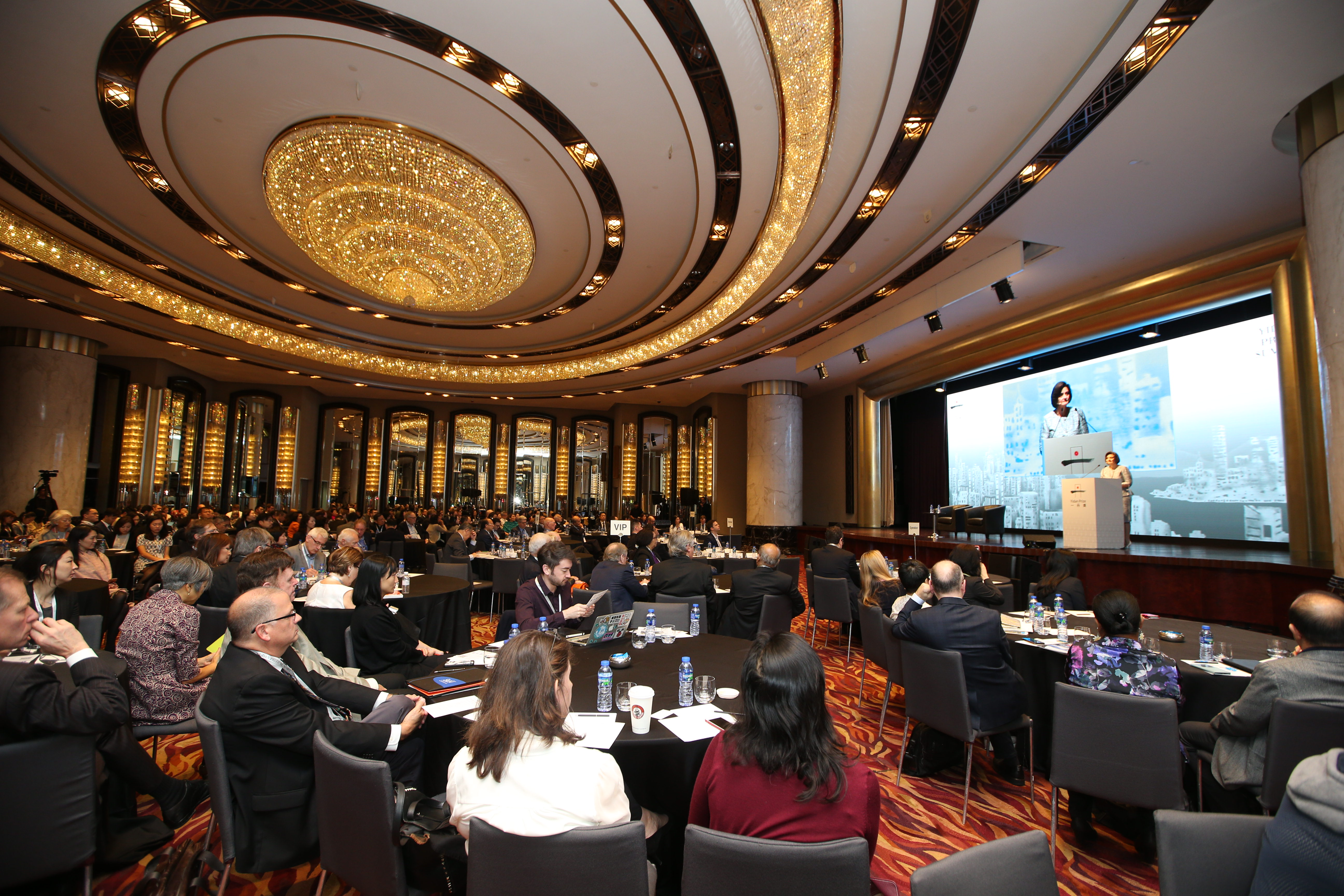
The first Yidan Prize Summit, in December 2017

The Yidan Prizes consist of a gold medal designed by ink-brush artist Kan Tai-Keung, a cash prize of HK$15 million and a project fund of HK$15 million to each of the winners or winning teams, one for education research, the other for education development. It is supported by a US$320 million endowment. Prizes are awarded at the annual Yidan Prize Awards Presentation Ceremony in conjunction with an education conference.

== Adjudication process ==
Nominations are open to everyone. They can be submitted by universities, government agencies, think tanks or educators. The nominations are reviewed by the Yidan Prize Judging Committee, an independent body made up of two panels. Former Director-General of UNESCO, Kōichirō Matsuura, is the chairman of the Yidan Prize Judging Committee. Dorothy K. Gordon heads the Yidan Prize for Education Development judging panel, and Andreas Schleicher heads the Yidan Prize for Education Research judging panel.

Judging criteria include being future-oriented, innovative, transformative, and sustainable.

== Laureates ==
Two awards are given each year, one for education research, the other for education development.

=== Education Research ===
Laureates for Education Research
Year	Laureate	Image	Notes
2017	Carol S. Dweck		The award ceremony took place during December 2017 in Hong Kong.
2018	Anant Agarwal		
2019	Usha Goswami		
2020	Carl Wieman		American physicist, for his work in STEM education and for his research-based improvements to university teaching and the transformation of how science is taught in major universities. When awarded the prize, Wieman stated: I am thrilled and honored to have the work of my research group recognized in this way. This prize will accelerate our efforts to improve education for students throughout the world.
2021	Eric A. Hanushek		Paul and Jean Hanna Senior Fellow at the Hoover Institution of Stanford University
2022	Linda Darling-Hammond		
2023	Michelene Chi		
2024	Wolfgang Lutz		
2025	Uri Wilensky		

=== Education Development ===
Laureates in Education Development
Year	Laureate	Image	Notes
2017	Vicky Colbert		The award ceremony took place during December 2017 in Hong Kong.
2018	Larry Hedges		
2019	Fazle Hasan		
2020	Lucy Lake; Angeline Murimirwa (pictured)		Both from Camfed, a Non-governmental organization (NGO) that seeks to eradicate poverty in Africa through the education of girls and the empowerment of young women, were awarded the prize for their contributions to education for girls and education development in Sub-Saharan Africa. Lucy Lake, CEO of the NGO stated: This Prize brings a spotlight to the power of our growing movement led by young women who are the experts on what it takes for the most marginalized girls to succeed. Together, we will launch our ambition to support five million girls in school, and it will be game-changing.
2021	Rukmini Banerji		CEO of Pratham Education Foundation.
2022	Yongxin Zhu		
2023	Shai Reshef		
2024	Mark Jordans; Marwa Zahr; Luke Stannard		all of War Child Alliance.
2025	Mamadou Amadou Ly		Executive Director, Associates in Research and Education for Development.

== Worldwide "Educating for the Future" Index ==
In 2017 the Yidan Prize Foundation released a Worldwide "Educating for the Future" Index (researched by the Economist Intelligence Unit) comparing the education in 35 developed and developing economies (ranking by 16 indicators of education policy, "teaching environment" and "socio-economic environment"), placing New Zealand and Canada in the top two places.
