= Usha Goswami =

British Neuroscientist & scholar

Usha Goswami CBE FRS FBA
- Born: Usha Claire Goswami; 21 February 1960 (age 66)
- Education: University of Oxford (BA, DPhil); University of London (PGCE)
- Known for: Contributions to cognitive development
- Scientific career
- Fields: Cognitive neuroscience
- Workplaces: University of Cambridge
- Thesis: Children's use of analogy in reading and spelling (1986)
- Doctoral advisor: Peter Bryant
- Website: www.neuroscience.cam.ac.uk/directory/profile.php?ucg10

Usha Claire Goswami CBE FRS FBA (born 21 February 1960) is a researcher and professor of Cognitive Developmental Neuroscience at the University of Cambridge, a Fellow of St. John's College, Cambridge, and the director of the Centre for Neuroscience in Education, Downing Site. She obtained her Ph.D. in developmental psychology from the University of Oxford before becoming a professor of cognitive developmental psychology at the University College London. Goswami's work is primarily in educational neuroscience with major focuses on reading development and developmental dyslexia.

== Early life and education ==
Goswami was born on 21 February 1960. She received her Bachelor of Arts (BA) degree in experimental psychology from the St John's College, Oxford. She then went on to receive her Post Graduate Certificate of Education (PGCE) from the University of London in primary education allowing her to become a teacher. In 1987 she received her Doctor of Philosophy (DPhil) in psychology from the University of Oxford with her main topics being reading and spelling by analogy.

== Career and research ==
Goswami was a research fellow at Merton College, Oxford for the 1986–87 and 1988–89 academic years. She was at the University of Illinois from 1987 to 1988 having received a Harkness Fellowship. She was a lecturer in experimental psychology at the University of Cambridge from 1990 to 1997. Then, from 1997 to 2002, she was Professor of Cognitive Developmental Psychology at the Institute of Child Health, University College London. In January 2003, she moved to the University of Cambridge where she currently works as the director for the Centre for Neuroscience in Education and Professor of Cognitive Developmental Neuroscience.

Goswami is currently the Director of the Centre for Neuroscience in Education at the University of Cambridge. The Centre utilizes electroencephalogram (EEG) and functional near-infrared spectroscopy (fNIRS) to study the developing brain. Some of her current research projects include the neural basis of developmental dyslexia, the neural basis of speech and language impairments, and the neural basis of rhythmic motor behavior.

Goswami's research is concerned with focusing on dyslexia as a language disorder rather than a visual disorder, as she has found that the way that children with dyslexia hear language is slightly different than others. Goswami is currently researching whether reading poetry, nursery rhymes, and singing can be used to help children with dyslexia.

=== Honours and awards ===
Early in her career, Goswami was awarded the British Psychology Society Spearman Medal (for early career research excellence), the Norman Geschwind-Rodin Prize (a Swedish award for research excellence in the field of dyslexia), and received research fellowships from the National Academy of Education (USA), the Alexander von Humboldt Foundation (Germany), and the Leverhulme Trust. She has served on the National Curriculum and the National Literacy Project, the Foresight Project on Mental Capital and Wellbeing in 2008, and the Managing Committee of the European Concerted Action on Learning Disorders as a Barrier to Human Development. In 2013 she was 1 of 42 UK-based scholars that year to be selected to become a Fellow of the British Academy awarded to those with academic distinction in their research. Goswami has also been a member of several research boards including the ESRC Research Grants Board (1998-2000), the Neurosciences and Mental Health Board of the Medical Research Council (1999-2003), and the Cross Board Group of the Medical Research Council (2001-2003). Usha Goswami was awarded the Yidan Prize for Education Research in September 2019 for her ground-breaking neuroscience research in understanding brain function, which allows educators to design different teaching pedagogy, techniques and tools to help children with dyslexia and special needs to learn languages more effectively.

Goswami was appointed Commander of the Order of the British Empire (CBE) in the 2021 New Year Honours for services to educational research. She was elected a Fellow of the Royal Society in May 2021.

=== Publications ===
- Huss M, Verney JP, Fosker T, Mead N & Goswami U (2011). Music, rhythm, rise time perception and developmental dyslexia: Perception of musical meter predicts reading and phonology. Cortex, 47, 674-89.
- Beddington J, Cooper CL, Field J, Goswami U, Huppert FA, Jenkins R, Jones HS, Kirkwood TBL, Sahakian BJ & Thomas SM (2008). The mental wealth of nations. Nature 455: 1057-1060.
- Goswami U (2006). Neuroscience and education: from research to practice? Nat Rev Neurosci 7(5):406-11.
- Ziegler J & Goswami U (2005). Reading acquisition, developmental dyslexia, and skilled reading across languages: a psycholinguistic grain size theory, Psychological Bulletin, 131(1), 3-29.
- Goswami, U (2014). Child Psychology: A very short introduction. Oxford University Press.
- Goswami, U (2010). The Wiley-Blackwell Handbook of Childhood Cognitive Development: 2nd Edition. Blackwell Handbooks of Developmental Psychology.
- Goswami, U (2010). Phonology, reading and reading difficulty. In K. Hall, U. Goswami, C. Harrison, S. Ellis and J. Soler (Eds) Interdisciplinary Perspectives on Learning to Read: Culture, Cognition and Pedagogy. London: Routledge.
- Goswami, U (2008). Cognitive Development: The Learning Brain. Psychology Press, Taylor & Francis.
- Cooper CL, Field J, Goswami U, Jenkins R, & Sahakian BJ (2009) (Eds.). Mental Capital and Wellbeing. Oxford: Wiley-Blackwell.
- Goswami, U (2008). Cognitive Development: The Learning Brain. Psychology Press, Taylor & Francis.
- Goswami, U (2006). Cognitive Development: Critical Concepts in Psychology. London: Routledge.
- Goswami, U (2002 & 2004). Blackwell Handbook of Childhood Cognitive Development. Oxford: Blackwell.
