= Ayisha Fuseini =

Ghanaian social entrepreneur

- Citizenship: Ghanaian
- Education: Diploma in Business Administration
- Occupation: Social entrepreneur
- Known for: Founder and CEO of Asheba enterprise
- Notable work: Shea butter production, women empowerment
- Awards: Female entrepreneur of the year (2018), Business Innovation of the year (2018

Ayisha Fuseini is a Ghanaian social entrepreneur. Fuseini is the founder and CEO of a company called Asheba Enterprise, registered in 2013 in Ghana, working with over 600 women in rural communities in Tamale; Northern region. She established a processing center that reduces the workload of the women she works with. Her enterprise also provides financial services to support women in the Shea business. Her company produces beauty products such as soap, body creams and other products using high quality shea butter. She is also a supplier of shea butter to The Body Shop chain.

As part of her venture into entrepreneurship, she joined the CAMFED Association of Young Women Leaders. This opened many opportunities, including training her to be a peer educator. Using the knowledge she gained during the program, she organized and trained 70 women to gather and process shea nuts into butter. She trains women groups on improved production methods that fetch high prices for higher quality butter.

== Personal life ==
Ayisha is a divorced mother of three.

== Education ==
She holds a Diploma in Business Administration and was recognized as an investment business programmer by Invest in Africa's (IIA) Business Linkage Programme (BLP) in 2016.

== Awards ==
She won two Invest in Africa awards in January 2018: Female Entrepreneur of the Year (2018) and Business Innovation of the Year.
