= Beryl Levinger =

American academic and educator

Beryl Levinger is an American academic and educator. Until September 2020, she was a professor of international development and chair of the Development Practice and Policy Program at the Middlebury Institute of International Studies at Monterey, California. She now serves as Chief Learning Officer and democracy lead at Root Change, an NGO dedicated to advancing equity in the US and global south.

== Biography ==
Levinger is an international development professional who focuses on strengthening civil society and building democratic resilience. She has worked in over 90 countries for multiple international development organizations, including the World Bank, USAID, Save the Children, CARE, AFS International, the Carter Center, the International Committee of the Red Cross, Grameen Foundation, and the Inter-American Development Bank. A graduate of the Bronx High School of Science, Cornell University, and the University of Alabama, Levinger also served (until 2018) as distinguished visiting professor within Emory University's Master's in Development Practice program.

Levinger is one of the three co-founders (along with Vicky Colbert and Oscar Mogollon) of the highly acclaimed Escuela Nueva movement that began in Colombia. She is also founder of the Coverdell Peace Corps Fellows Program and was part of the team that founded InterAction, the leading association of NGOs supporting humanitarian assistance. Among her books are Human Capacity Development Across the Lifespan and Nutrition, Health, Education and for All. In 1996, she delivered the ninth annual Martin J. Forman Memorial Lecture (Capacity, Capital and Calories), based on her research regarding the interplay among learning outcomes, nutrition and health.

Levinger served as director or co-director of research for all but one of the annual Save the Children's State of the World's Mothers Report. In 2016, the organization retired that report and introduced in its stead an annual End of Childhood Report; Levinger co-directed the research for this new publication, which compares the nature of childhood across 175 countries.
