= Dorothy Gordon (activist) =

Ghanaian technology activist and development specialist

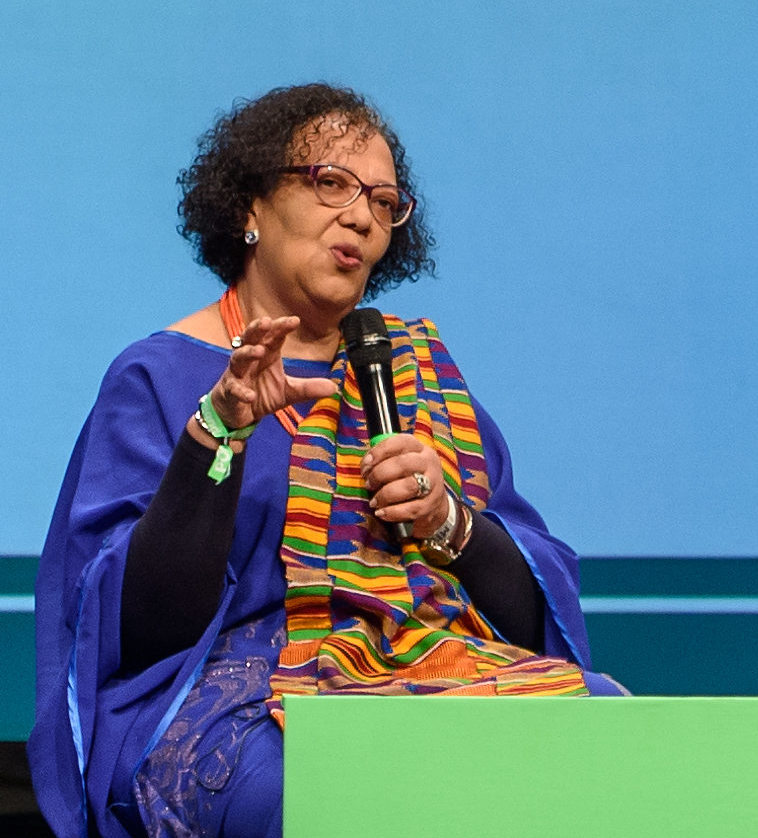
- Dorothy Gordon at re:publica 18
- Born: Dorothy Gordon; Nsawam, Ghana
- Education: Achimota School, University of Ghana, University of Sussex

Dorothy K. Gordon is a Ghanaian technology activist and development specialist. She was the founding director general of the Ghana-India Kofi Annan Centre of Excellence in ICT (AITI-KACE). She left AITI-KACE in 2016. She is former board member of Creative Commons and currently serves on its advisory council. She also serves on the board of Linux Professional Institute

== Early life ==
Gordon was born in Nsawam, Ghana, she spent her childhood in the United Kingdom and Nigeria and returned to Ghana for secondary school. She is fluent in English and French.

== Education ==
She received her secondary education from Achimota School and went on to the University of Ghana and the Institute of Development Studies of the University of Sussex.

== Professional life ==
Gordon has worked in technology and development for over 25 years. She worked as a Senior Deputy Resident Representative at the UNDP. Dorothy Gordon steered policy and training programmes on open source technologies of AITI-KACE in Ghana and other African countries as a council member of the Free Software and Open Source Foundation for Africa (FOSSFA). In 2013, she was named one of twenty of 'Africa’s Most Powerful Women In Technology'.

=== Early career ===
Her early career was focused on rural development and environmental issues. She completed National Service with the Institute of Statistical, Social and Economic Research at the University of Ghana working on migration studies. She moved to Senegal where she worked with ENDA Tier Monde (Environment Development Action in the Third World), first on the Action Research Team in the Sine-Saloum and Fleuve and then as editor for the English version of the international journal ENDA-Action.

UNDP

After her post-graduate studies she joined UNDP in the newly formed NGO division in UNDP-HQ as the Africa 2000 network co-ordinator. She designed and implemented this multimillion-dollar project with a focus on sustainable environmental management and promotion of indigenous technical knowledge transfer between rural communities throughout the African continent. Other UN assignments included work as Assistant Resident Representative in Zambia and managing volunteer engagements in the Sahel and subsequently South Asia with United Nations Volunteers in Geneva and Bonn. In her role as Senior Deputy Resident Representative in India she had oversight over one of the largest UNDP country programmes with direct responsibility for achieving targets against negotiated monitoring and evaluation frameworks during a period of organisational restructuring. The first joint programme evaluation was carried out during her tenure.

Communications and Consulting

During a special leave from the UN to work in Ghana, she was a consultant on the USAID Leland project with a focus on public access through telecenters as well as other projects for CAFRAD, ECA, UNDP and others. As a PricewaterhouseCoopers associate, she worked on public and civil society assignments involving strategy and organisational restructuring. She also lectured on NGO management at the Ghana Institute of Management and Public Administration. She served for 2 terms on the board of the Ghana Broadcasting Corporation and was part of the team which drafted the National Media Policy incorporating principles of media freedom and independence.

Ghana-India Kofi Annan Centre of Excellence in ICT (AITI-KACE)

Appointed in 2003 as the first Director-General of the Ghana-India Kofi Annan Centre of Excellence in ICT, she set up internal systems and external partnerships to establish and position AITI as a Centre of Excellence in ICT with a global reputation and strong leadership within Africa. Financial sustainability was achieved through consistent growth and expansion of activity in areas of training, consulting, community engagement and advisory services for governments, regional and multilateral bodies including ECOWAS, UNESCO and the World Bank as well as major global technology companies.

In addition to technology leadership through introduction of emerging technologies and related new training products and methodologies, she ensured that AITI-KACE also supported programmes including code camps and information literacy to reach underserved communities. These included women, the aged and rural youth. The annual innovation week was established to encourage technology start-ups, strategic use of licensing regimes including CC and GPL and improved links between public, private and civil sectors and the technology community. AITI is a best practice example for India's IT diplomacy and South-South cooperation. The Centre has inspired the establish of many similar Centres globally.

As Director-General she served as a member on a number of think tanks, commissions and advisory panels including the World Bank World Development Report 2016: Digital Dividends; Global Commission for Internet Governance (GCIG) for 'One Internet'.

== Current involvements ==
Currently she remains actively involved at Board or Jury level on a number of global initiatives working on defining a better technology mediated future. She is a board member and expert for the World Summit Awards. She also serves on the board of directors of the Linux Professional Institute. She works on gender and technology with Chatham House and as Chair for the Working group on Information Literacy UNESCO/IFAP. She is also an Advisory council member Creative Commons Global and for kasahorow an NGO that gives African language speakers around the world the freedom to express themselves in their own languages in the digital age.

She serves on the editorial board of the Journal of Cyber Policy as well as the International Journal of Gender Science and Technology. She is a long term Council Member of the Free Software and Open Source Foundation for Africa. She is also Chair of Literacy Bridge Ghana, which works to save lives and improve livelihoods of impoverished families through comprehensive programmes that provide on-demand access to locally relevant knowledge.

In 2018, she took part in the World Summit Awards Grand Jury in Ghana and spoke as the WSA Expert in Ghana. The event was held from November 3, 2018 to November 7, 2018.
