= Linux Professional Institute =

Canadian non-profit technical organisation

- LPI logo
- Founded: October 25, 1999; 27 years ago
- Type: 149(1), Income Tax Act (Canada), Non-profit organization
- Purpose: IT qualification
- Location: Toronto, Ontario, Canada
- Products: Linux Essentials; Open Source Essentials; Security Essentials; Web Development Essentials; LPIC-1; LPIC-2; LPIC-3 300; LPIC-3 303; LPIC-3 304; LPIC-3 305; LPIC-3 306; DevOps Tools Engineer; BSD Specialist
- Key people: G. Matthew Rice (Executive Director); Uirá Ribeiro (Chairman of the board); Brian Clemens (Vice-Chair); Board members: André Bermudes Casagrande; Simone Davide Bertulli; Sean Davis; Henrietta Dombrovskaya; Werner Fischer; Tiago Felipe Goncalves; Dorothy Gordon; Klaus Knopper; Michinori Nakahara; Ricardo Prudenciato; Jill Ratkevic; Jon "maddog" Hall (Chair Emeritus)
- Website: www.lpi.org

The Linux Professional Institute (LPI) is a non-profit organization with a global presence, offering certifications for Linux, BSD, and other open source software-based technologies. It was founded in October 1999 in Canada. LPI now has offices on six continents to coordinate certification and partnerships, and created a membership program in 2020. According to LPI, it has certified over 350,000 professionals in 180 countries as of February 2026.

== Certifications ==
LPI's certification portfolio includes the Linux Essentials certificate, the multi-level Linux Professional Institute Certification (LPIC) program, BSD Specialist, DevOps Tools Engineer, and entry-level certificates covering Linux, web development, security, and open source concepts.

== Learning Materials ==
In addition to certification programs, LPI publishes free online learning materials through its LPI Learning platform. The materials are aligned with certification objectives and are available in multiple languages.

== See also ==
- Free and Open Source Software
- Project Management Institute
- ISC²
- Certified Information Systems Security Professional
