= Cambodian Children's Fund =

Cambodian non-profit organisation

- Founded: 2004
- Founder: Scott Neeson
- Type: Non-governmental organization
- Location: Phnom Penh, Cambodia
- Region served: Cambodia
- Website: cambodianchildrensfund.org

Cambodian Children's Fund (CCF) is a non-profit organisation, founded in 2004 by Scott Neeson to help children in Steung Meanchey, one of the poorest areas in Cambodia's capital Phnom Penh. Initially established to support 45 children in need, CCF now educates over 2,000 children. In addition, it serves 12,000 people in the communities where it works through a range of community outreach, healthcare, childcare and vocational training programs.

== History ==
=== Scott Neeson ===
Scott Neeson is the Founder and Executive Director of Cambodian Children's Fund. Neeson was born in Edinburgh, Scotland. At age 5, he and his family moved to Elizabeth, South Australia. Neeson dropped out of high school at the age of 16 and found employment with a drive-in cinema company. Neeson moved up the ladder to film promoter and then to film buyer, eventually becoming managing director of the distribution arm at 20th Century Fox Australia in 1986. Neeson emigrated to Los Angeles in 1993 to accept the role of Vice President of international marketing with 20th Century Fox. Neeson spent 10 years at 20th Century Fox, culminating in tenure as President of 20th Century Fox International.

=== Founding of Cambodian Children's Fund ===
Neeson visited Phnom Penh, Cambodia, during a five-week vacation in 2003. While there he visited the Phnom Penh municipal dump, and met some of the 1,500 children who resided there. In 2004, Neeson established Cambodian Children's Fund. In December 2004, he emigrated permanently to Phnom Penh to manage the organisation.

== Mission ==
CCF's mission, as stated on its website, is to "transform the country's most impoverished kids into tomorrow's leaders, by delivering education, family support and community development programs into the heart of Cambodia's most impoverished communities".

== Programs ==
=== Health care ===
Children are given a complete physical examination, immunizations, dental check and treatment for any pre-existing medical conditions. The Medical Centre provides free to access medical care to anyone in the community. A maternal care program provides support to expecting mothers. By mid 2016, 1000 children had been born through CCF's Maternal Care Program with a reduction in maternal death rate from 8% to 0%.

=== Child Protection Unit ===
The Child Protection Unit is a joint venture between CCF and the Cambodian National Police that brings child abusers to justice while protecting victims. Since the CPU began operating in July 2013 it has investigated 780 cases of serious child abuse, child rape and homicide, leading to 590 arrests, with almost all resulting in a conviction.

In July 2014, it was reported that the CPU was involved in the high-profile arrest of a school director accused of giving pedophiles access to children in his care.

=== World Housing ===
World Housing is a Canadian-based social venture that "provides homes to families living in slums in the developing world, fostering communities where families can thrive with safety, security, and access to the resources that change lives". CCF is World Housing's in-country partner in Cambodia.

As at November 2016 over 350 World Housing homes have been built for CCF families within the Steung Meanchey area. Each house is 13 m^{2} (140 sq ft), insulated, solar powered and built raised above the ground in traditional Khmer (Cambodian) style, with a concrete pad below. A CCF family is eligible for a World Housing home provided they show "a commitment to prioritising their children's education, providing a safe environment for their children to grow up in, free from drugs, alcohol and abuse, and keeping their children out of the workforce."

== Awards ==
In 2007, Quincy Jones awarded CCF founder Scott Neeson the inaugural Harvard School of Public Health "Q Prize" in recognition of his "extraordinary leadership in advocacy for children" through CCF. In the same year, CCF received the Rex Foundation Bill Graham award for creating a sanctuary for Cambodian children to thrive, learn and grow.

Neeson was the recipient of the Ahimsa Award in 2012, presented annually at the House of Commons to an individual who embodies non-violence and compassion.

CCF received a 2012 WISE Award, recognizing its transformative impact on education and society. The WISE Awards identify, showcase and promote six innovative educational projects each year.

In 2014, Charity Navigator awarded CCF a perfect "four star" rating for both financial performance and transparency. In 2016 CCF's overall Charity Navigator rating increased to 100% for accountability and transparency.

In 2016, GreatNonProfits included CCF in their list of "2016 Top Rated Nonprofits".

In 2016, the Variety International Children's Fund named Scott Neeson as the recipient of its annual Humanitarian Award.
