= Camfed =

International non-profit organization

CAMFED
- Founded: In 1993 by Ann Cotton
- Type: NGO; Non-profit; Development; Education
- Locations: National offices: Camfed International: Cambridge, UK; Camfed USA: San Francisco, California; Camfed Canada: Toronto, Ontario; Camfed Ghana: Ghana; Camfed Kenya: Kenya; Camfed Malawi: Malawi; Camfed Tanzania: Tanzania; Camfed Zimbabwe: Zimbabwe; Camfed Zambia: Zambia
- Methods: Education of girls and empowerment of women
- Key people: Angeline Murimirwa (CEO)
- Website: camfed.org

CAMFED (also known as the Campaign for Female Education) is an international non-governmental, non-profit organization founded in 1993. The mission of the organization is to eradicate poverty in Africa through the education of girls and the empowerment of young women. CAMFED programs operate in Zimbabwe, Zambia, Ghana, Tanzania, Malawi and Kenya.

== History ==
CAMFED was founded in 1993 by Ann Cotton to support girls to go to school who would otherwise be denied an education because of poverty. The idea for CAMFED came from after a research trip to Zimbabwe in which she came to believe that the low enrollment of females in school was due to poverty that did not allow them to cover the school fees. It began with support for 32 girls to attend secondary school in two rural districts of Zimbabwe. By 2017, Camfed had supported more than 1.5 million children through education in a network of 5,500 schools in Ghana, Kenya, Malawi, Tanzania, Zambia and Zimbabwe. By 2023, Camfed reported helping 6.4 million children in total, including 1.8 million girls in secondary education.

Anticipating the need for post-school economic opportunities for young people in marginalized rural communities, the CAMFED Alumnae Association (CAMA) was established in 1998 to connect young female school leavers and offer pathways to post-secondary school opportunities. CAMA provides a structure through which its members can develop their activism and leadership. By 2024, CAMA had a membership of 312,747"CAMFED website". young women, among them now teachers, business leaders, government officials, health professionals and entrepreneurs. A hallmark of Camfed is the activism and philanthropy of its alumnae network, who are actively raising and administering funds to support the next generation of children in school.

== Work ==
CAMFED focuses on rural areas of Africa where poverty is widespread, and girls and young women face massive exclusion from education and the opportunities that are afforded by education. CAMFED works to build around girls a supportive environment in which they can attend, and succeed, at primary and secondary school, and progress into young adulthood with opportunities that include professional training, higher education and job creation.

CAMFED provides aid by paying for school fees, providing school uniforms, books, and sanitary protection. They also work with the school by training teachers to be mentors.

=== CAMA ===
CAMA, the CAMFED Alumnae Association, is the alumnae association for CAMFED graduates.

CAMA provides a structure through which its members can develop their activism and leadership. This is referred to as the 'CAMA Multiplier Effect', where these young women graduates are now leading the movement for girls' education in their communities. The ability of CAMA members to lead and implement such long lasting change comes from their lived experience.

=== The Learner Guide Program ===
The Learner Guide program was started and is run by women in the CAMFED alumnae association CAMA network who volunteer in local schools to deliver a tailored curriculum encompassing leadership, health, learning and life skills to their younger peers.

This is a two part project that concurrently addresses equal access to quality education for children and the post-secondary school transition period for young women. Firstly, the Learner Guide Program offers a training program for young women to become Learner Guides, opening up post-secondary opportunities, providing transferable skills training, and work experience. Secondly, Learner Guides deliver a tailored program that supports marginalized children through their education, alongside the standard school curriculum.

== CAMFED and the Sustainable Development Goals ==
The Sustainable Development Goals, a set of universal goals aimed to tackle poverty, inequality, discrimination and climate change across the world, came into action on 1 January 2016. As part of the 2030 Agenda for Sustainable Development, these goals are designed to mobilize global efforts to transform the world in fifteen years.

CAMFED is contributing directly to progress with SDG4: Quality Education. In addition, through the sustainable and scalable programs introduced by CAMFED in educating girls, and supporting young women through their transition into secure livelihoods, CAMFED's work contributes to achieving many of the Sustainable Development Goals including Goal 1: Poverty, Goal 3: Good Health, Goal 5: Gender Equality, Goal 13: Climate Action, and more.

== Accreditation ==
In October 2014, CAMFED was recognized by the Organisation for Economic Co-operation and Development (OECD) for best practice in taking development innovation to scale.

In 2017, The Learner Guide Program was awarded the WISE Award.

As of 1 October 2019, CAMFED USA is rated by Charity Navigator at 96.30 out of 100 overall, with a rating of 96.64 out of 100 for its financials and a 96.00 out of 100 for transparency and accountability.

CAMFED's Lucy Lake and Angeline Murimirwa were awarded the 2020 Yidan Prize for Education Development for their contributions to STEM and women’s education.

== Notable supporters ==
CAMFED has been endorsed by actor Morgan Freeman, former US President Bill Clinton, author Doris Lessing, former Prime Minister of Australia and GPE Board Chair Julia Gillard, singer/songwriter Joan Armatrading, actress, singer/songwriter, and philanthropist Rihanna, businesswoman and philanthropist Martha Lane Fox and actress, model and activist Emma Watson. Social entrepreneur Ayisha Fuseini became a benefactor of the CAMFED program when she submitted her pitch for her shea butter business.

== See also ==
- Educate Girls, a similar nonprofit
- Room to Read
- Plan International
- Global Partnership for Education
- Girls' education
