= Ahimsa Award =

Annual Jain award

The Ahimsa Award is an annual award given by the Institute of Jainology in recognition of individuals who embody and promote the principles of ahimsa (nonviolence). It was established in 2006 and has since been awarded at the annual Ahimsa Day event, on 2 October, the birth anniversary of Mahatma Gandhi.

The event is normally held at the Palace of Westminster—House of Commons of the United Kingdom, in London, where various members of parliament are invited to speak. It is bestowed by the directors of the Institute of Jainology, an international body based in the UK, representing the Jain faith.

== Ahimsa Day ==
Ahimsa Day was established by the Institute of Jainology and has been celebrated annually in London since 2002. It was created to bring awareness of Ahimsa (nonviolence) as it applies in Jainism. The event takes place in early October to commemorate the birth anniversary of Mahatma Gandhi, who, amongst other great leaders, was inspired by the Jain philosophy of ahimsa. In 2007, the United Nations declared that the International Day of Non-Violence would take place on 2 October.

== History and background ==
Ahimsa, the "principle of nonviolence", is a concept adopted by most Indic religious traditions, primarily Buddhist, Hindu, and Jain. The political and social application of ahimsa was given universal recognition by Mahatma Gandhi, who fought the campaign for the independence of India with the doctrine of ahimsa as the cornerstone.

Ahimsa in Jainism was a well-established core principle even before the time of Mahavira, the 24th Thirthankara in the 5th century BCE. The principle of Ahimsa in Jainism states that one should do no harm by word, thought, or deed, nor ask others to, and nor condone that which is done.

== Past winners ==
- 2006 Nelson Mandela
- 2007 Dalai Lama
- 2008 Acharya Mahaprajna
- 2009 Padmanabh Jaini
- 2010 Nalini Balbir
- 2011 Nitin Mehta
- 2012 Scott Neeson
- 2013 Melanie Joy
- 2014 Ingrid Newkirk
- 2015 Charles, Prince of Wales
- 2015 Ann Cotton
- 2016 Rajendra Singh
- 2017 Ravinder Singh
- 2018 Shantilal Mutha
- 2020 Peter Tabichi
- 2021 Satish Kumar
- 2022 Kumarpal Desai
- 2023 Jasvant Modi
- 2024 Surendra Patawari
