= Oscar Mogollon =

Education visionary

Oscar Mogollón Jaimes (1940 – 18 October 2009) was a Colombian educator. He was an education visionary of the late 20th century who pioneered the Escuela Nueva model and the Active school approach, educational models that have been used to improve the quality of education of the poorest children around the world.

== Biography ==
Mogollón was born in the city of Pamplona, Colombia where he studied Psychopedagogy at the University of Pamplona. Mogollón pioneered the creation of Escuela Nueva and the Active schools approach, which are successful educational models that expanded throughout Colombia, Latin America, and Africa. Mogollón devoted his entire life to creating new ways of improving the quality of education of the poorest children in the most impoverished rural communities. His ideas and educational models changed the lives of millions of children around the world. Mogollón died of cancer in 2009, but his educational models are still widely used by international organizations around the world.

== Career ==
Mogollón was a pedagogue that started his career as a teacher in rural Colombia in 1964. He managed to take into practice the principles of Active school and he proved that it was possible to deliver a better quality of education to the children of the most impoverished areas. By his own initiative, Mogollón organized the teachers of more than 100 schools to build and develop strategies together that would change the conditions of education in Colombia. Later in 1976, with Vicky Colbert and Beryl Levinger, created Escuela Nueva, which has been key in the improvement of education in Latin America.

Mogollón held important positions within the Ministry of National Education (Colombia), and kept developing methodologic strategies to improve quality of education. Having been a teacher himself, Oscar knew that a successful school required successful teachers, so he formed a work force of competent teachers able to attend the diverse problems of the rural school. He also created teacher´s circles, where teachers helped other teachers build their knowledge and where everyone shared their thoughts. He found new ways to keep track of the teachers work, he encouraged the visits of inspectors and technical support, but not to control the teachers, but to support them in their work, he called this "acompañamiento pedagogico" or educational support. With this idea, the teachers in the most remote geographical areas started to feel the need of networking with the outside world, to be able to share their doubts and get some feedback on their work. He also motivated guided teacher internships, in which the teachers were able to see examples of how other schools solved the same problems. This was also an opportunity to generate new ways of teaching and learning.

Later while working for AED (non-profit) as international Consultant for education in Guatemala, Nicaragua, Peru, Equatorial Guinea, he applied his experiences in Colombia and adapted the Colombian model to the needs, aspirations, contexts and interest of each country. The governments of many countries gave several awards to Mogollón for his successful efforts in improving the quality of education of the poorest areas.

== Improving the quality of education ==
Knowing the limitations of a rural school and taking them into consideration, Mogollón started to innovate strategies to customize the learning process for each boy and girl according to their individual needs. He started to think about the conditions of the rural teacher and he highlighted the need of training teachers constantly in order to revitalize their skills and knowledge and to improve their personal and professional growth, and that way create engagement and commitment from the teachers to the school.

Mogollón´s thoughts were focused on building a rural school that would answer the problems of low quality, inequality, low coverage and internal deficiency. This is the reason he focused in rural teachers, and knowing that it was difficult to measure the quality of a teacher, specially in the most impoverished areas, he developed methods that raised the enthusiasm of teachers, as they became more involved in the school and interested in their own learning. He worked intensively to improve the conditions in which they work and to improve their social image.

Mogollón changed the ways of thinking and attitude of teachers in Latin America and Africa, making them realize the key role they play in the quality of learning. He made visible the teachers of the most geographically remote areas, bringing them pedagogic tools to address the need of the multigrade school. He brought to the teachers tools that made them able to analyze deep conceptualizations of evolutive psychology, and learning psychology, didactic and learning strategies integrated in practice, in the classroom and community. He frequently quoted Paulo Freire, saying "No one is born fully-formed: it is through self-experience in the world that we become what we are." Inspired by Freire and other renowned pedagogues, he encouraged teachers to share experiences, learn from one another and to build new knowledge from their daily practice.
