= Mamadou Amadou Ly =

Senegalese nonprofit executive

- Born: Senegal
- Occupation: Nonprofit executive
- Organization(s): Executive Director of Associates in Research and Education for Development
- Awards: Yidan Prize 2025, Time 100 2026

Mamadou Amadou Ly is a Senegalese nonprofit executive and educational leader who serves as the Executive Director of Associates in Research and Education for Development (ARED), a nonprofit dedicated to developing bilingual educational systems in Africa that integrate both French and native languages into schooling. He was awarded the Yidan Prize in 2025, becoming the first person from Africa to be awarded the prize, and was included in the Time 100 in 2026.

== Biography ==
He first became involved in education when he started teaching his illiterate parents how to read and write, and soon became driven by the education system in Senegal, where early education is conducted in French, despite most of the population not speaking it, to become an educational activist.

He took over as head of ARED after the death of founder Sonja Sutterberg-Diablo, also Senegal-based.

He has led ARED to develop bilingual education systems in Africa that integrate both French and native languages, such as Wolof and Pulaar, into schooling. Documents produced by ARED and shared through the Early Learning Resources Network as Open Educational Resources have been utilized by the governments of Senegal, Mauritania, and The Gambia. He has also worked in close collaboration with the Senegal Ministry of Education and the Mauritania Ministry of Education.

He was awarded a Yidan Prize, known as the "Nobel Prize for Education", in 2025. He was the first person from Africa to be awarded the Yidan Prize.

He was included in the Time 100 in 2026: his profile was written by Catherine M. Russell.
