= Education in Senegal =

Ministry of Education
- Leader(s): Kalidou Diallo

General details
- Primary languages: Wolof, French

Literacy (2018)
- Total: 57.7%
- Male: 69.7%
- Female: 46.6%

The Senegalese education system is based on its French equivalent. The state is responsible for the creation of an educational system that enables every citizen access to education. Articles 21 and 22 of the Constitution adopted in January 2001 guarantee access to education for all children. However, due to limited resources and low demand for secular education in areas where Islamic education is more prevalent, the law is not fully enforced.

The Human Rights Measurement Initiative (HRMI) finds that Senegal is fulfilling only 58.1% of what it should be fulfilling for the right to education based on the country's level of income. HRMI breaks down the right to education by looking at the rights to both primary education and secondary education. While taking into consideration Senegal's income level, the nation is achieving 69.8% of what should be possible based on its resources (income) for primary education but only 46.4% for secondary education.

== Primary and secondary education ==
Determined on 16 February 1991, official law n° 91-22 states three main objectives concerning Senegalese education.

- Firstly the educational system should create conditions that enable development within the entire nation, by creating capable men and women who can work efficiently to improve their nation, and who have a specific interest in Khalfa's land economic, social and cultural development.
- Secondly the educational system should promote Senegal's values: liberty, democracy, personal and civic morality, human rights, and the upholding of Senegalese society's laws and regulations.
- Lastly the educational system should enhance the nation's culture by creating men and women who actively participate in national activities, who possess the ability to effectively reflect on problems, and who can contribute to the advancement of science.

Education is compulsory and free up to the age of 16. In 2002, the gross primary enrollment rate was 80%, and the net primary enrollment rate was 67.6%. Gross and net enrollment rates are based on the number of students formally registered in primary school and therefore do not necessarily reflect attendance. In 2000, 41.2% of children ages 5 to 14 years were attending school. Primary school attendance statistics are not available for Senegal. As of 2001, 80% of children who started primary school were likely to reach grade 5.

The Ministry of Labor has indicated that the public school system is unable to cope with the number of children that must enroll each year. As a result, many school-age children seek education and training through more informal means. A large number apprentice themselves to a shop, where they receive no wages. One government official estimated there are 100,000 children apprenticed in Dakar. The Agence Nationale de la Statistique et de la Démographie (ANSD) reports that, as of 2001, 32.7% of children age 10–14 had begun their professional lives.

In 2000 Senegalese governments and authorities set out to make revision to the educational system. Senegal's Ten-Year Education and Training Program (PDEF) facilitated this reform in the United Nations special initiatives for Africa. In 2000 Senegal published an announcement stating the country's education goals for the 2000–2010 decade. The reform was composed of several goals. Firstly, increasing access to education throughout the country. Secondly, the creation of an educational system that was pertinent to all classes of Senegalese people. Thirdly the creation/revision of an effective relationship between politics and education. Lastly the reorganization of resource acquisition and use. The government's 2010 goal was the actualization of a nationally cohesive education system.

Mamadou Amadou Ly has worked with the Senegalese government to provide a means to do education in national and traditional languages in addition to french.

=== Preschool ===
In Senegal preschool is provided for children ages 3–5, for up to three years of study. Children who attend preschool have the opportunity to enroll in induction courses at the age of six instead of having to wait until they are seven. Preschool is not obligatory. According to article 10, law n° 91-22 decreed 16 February 1991 Senegal's preschool system has two goals: To consolidate children's identities by anchoring them in the national languages and cultural values. Also to develop their motor skills, intellects, and social skills to develop their personalities and create a strong foundation for their future learning. Since 2007 there has been a focus on DIPE (développement intégré de la petite enfance). DIPE is a national priority for Senegal is based on the needs of the nations' children. In 2007, 57% of preschools and 36.9% of daycares were in Dakar.

=== Primary school ===
Primary school is designed for children ages 7 to 12. The Senegalese primary education system divides six years of study into three cycles of two years that culminate in the successful completion of the CFEE (Certificate of Elementary Completion) and an entrance test into the next cycle of education. For children enrolled in the education system, attendance is mandatory until the completion of second year elementary course. Article 11, law n° 91-22 dating 16 February 1991 states the Senegalese primary education goals. The curriculum places an emphasis on French grammar and reading, math and science, and geography, with less time being dedicated to arts education. there are also higher expectations in the upper grades.

=== Middle school ===
Middle school education is aimed at students ages 13 and is composed of four years of study. To successfully pass middle school students must succeed on their BFEM (brevet de fin d’études moyennes). Article 12, law n° 91-22 instated on 16 February 1991 states the objectives of middle school in Senegal. In 2007 624 public middle schools and 376 private middle schools were registered. Of these schools 58.4% were centralized in urban areas, with 51.4% residing in Dakar, Thiès, and Ziguinchor.

=== High school ===
Senegalese secondary education can be "general" or technical (adhering to the standards of the French system of the lycée). These secondary study programs last three years and are officially approved by the French baccalaureate. The technical secondary education program culminates in the passing of the BEP (brevet d’études professionnelles) and the BT (brevet de technicien). Senegal's objectives for secondary education are listed in article 12, law n° 91–22. While middle school education is for the most part uniform, secondary education offers four streams: general, long technical, short technical, and professional.

=== Multigrade teaching ===
Because of low population density, multigrade teaching is of particular significance in sub-Saharan Africa. Although it is already an integral part of the education system in Senegal, the use of multigrade teaching is expected to increase along with efforts and strategies aimed to provide education for all Senegalese children. Multigrade teaching is perceived by some to be a "second-rate" system. In Senegal 18% of schools have multigrade classes and 10% of children attending primary schools are in multigrade classes.

There are two models of multigrade teaching in Senegal. The first, the more common model, consists of one teacher teaching two consecutives grades at once. The other model is referred to as Ecole à Classe Unique and consists of one teacher working with up to six grades simultaneously. Multigrade schools usually reflect poor outcomes in the CFEE (Certificate of Elementary Completion) examination at the end of the year, with a 44% pass rate in Kaolack, 34% pass rate in Mbour, and a 46% pass rate in Mbacke.

=== Koranic schools ===
Senegalese state schools do not offer religious education, so children are sent to Koranic school instead. There is little data on Koranic education in Senegal. There is no defined structure for Koranic schools in Senegal. In 1999 World Bank identified three levels:

- The primary Koranic level: Children are given basic knowledge of the Koran.
- The secondary Koranic level: Children have large portions of the Koran memorize and are taught Islamic science.
- Higher Koranic studies: Very few reach this level, taught by prominent Islamic masters, usually in prestigious Islamic universities.

The aim of the Koranic school is to teach children to be good Muslims. In certain forms of Senegalese Koranic schooling children are fostered out to Koranic masters. Because of this they often are forced to become beggars to feed themselves. UCW: Understanding Children's Work estimates that 90% of child beggars in Senegal are students of this type of Koranic education. However, this sort of Koranic education is a minority. Usually Koranic schools in Senegal are in the form of Franco-Arab schools and are professional schools that balance French education and religious teaching.

== Higher education ==
Senegal has diverse options of institutes for higher education with private and public universities. University-level instruction is only in French. In 2012 the Ministry of Higher Education in Senegal in cooperation with UNESCO’S Regional Office in Dakar launched a project to improve the quality of higher education in Senegal. This project will establish training opportunities, prepare guides for foreign students, research on existing systems of quality assurance, and assess employment needs. Participants will discuss and learn from experts working in other African countries and throughout the world.

=== Challenges facing higher education in Senegal ===
According to Hassana Alidou, the chief of the Basic to Higher Education Section for UNESCO Dakar states that despite some improvements since 2000, the higher education system in Senegal struggles to cope with several challenges, such as the abundant student body attending the University of Dakar (UCAD). The rapid generation of private institutes of higher education has also been cause for concern. In addition, low performance and inadequate training resulting from a flawed system. Senegalese higher education institutions must address the unequal access between men and women. Lastly within the Senegalese system of higher education there is a matter of fraud in obtaining degrees.

=== Gaston Berger University ===
L'Université de Saint-Louis was created January 1990 and was later renamed Université Gaston Berger in 1997. Its mission statement can be found in article one of the 96-597 decree of 10 July 1996 and states that the university's main goals are to create a class of highly skilled individuals who contribute to scientific research at the national and international level, as well as to promote and develop African cultural values. The university is ten kilometers from the city of Saint-Louis and extends over 240 hectares. The university employs 185 professors/researchers, 348 administrative and technical workers, and 5347 students enrolled in 2010–2011.

=== Université du Sahel ===
The University of Sahel is a private institute for higher education in Dakar. In 2007 the university was validated by CAMES (Conseil africain et malgache pour l’enseignement supérieur) after their diplomas were determined to fulfill all the necessary requirements. The university is composed of faculties, institutes, laboratories, and an administrative and education staff dedicated to teaching, research, and student life.

=== Université Cheikh Anta Diop de Dakar ===
The Université Cheikh Anta Diop de Dakar was created 24 February 1957 and was officially inaugurated 9 December 1959. It was renamed from the University of Dakar to Université Cheikh Anta Diop de Dakar in 1987. Its focus is science and technical studies. The university's motto is "lux mea lex".

=== École Supérieure Multinationale des Télécommunications ===
Ecole Supérieure Multinationale des Télécommunications (ESMT) is in Dakar and was founded in 1981. It is part of the United Nations initiative for development.

=== Centre Africain d’Etudes Supérieures en Gestion (CESAG) ===
The CESAG was founded in 1985 by the CEAO (Conférence des Chefs d'Etat de la Communauté Economique de l'Afrique de l'Ouest) and was taken over by the BCEAO (Banque Centrale des Etats de l'Afrique de l'Ouest) in 1995. Today the school offers management programs for business in the public and private sector.

=== Technical and Vocational Education and Training (TVET) ===
Four main functions of National Office for Vocational Training (ONFP)

Technical and vocational training (TVET) addresses multiple demands of an economic, social and environmental nature by helping young people and adults to develop the skills they need for employment, decent work and entrepreneurship, promoting equitable, inclusive and sustainable economic growth, and supporting transitions to green economies and environmental sustainability.

The Ministry of Vocational Education, Apprenticeship and Crafts (MFPAA) runs the major public TVET schemes in Senegal in conjunction with the Ministry of National Education (MEN). Over the last decades the system has gone through changes which have improved it.

Several bodies provide training in the Senegal system (state, private, national and international bodies such as non-governmental organizations, NGOs). There are also different sources of funds. The following bodies play a major role:

- Fund for Financing Technical and Vocational Training (Fonds de Financement de la Formation Professionnelle et Technique, FFFPT ), which manages the funds collected by the training levy;
- National Office for Vocational Training (Office National de Formation Professionnelle, ONFP), which is a training provider as well as other functions.

Other institutional bodies involved in the system:

- The African Network of Vocational Training Funds and Institutions (RAFPRO) is a network of national funding institutions;
- Operational Repertoire for Occupation and Employment (Répertoire Opérationnel des Métiers et Emplois, ROAME) is a tool to enhance the quality of the TVET system.

== Challenges facing Senegalese education ==
In 1992 approximately 54 000 Senegalese youths were suspected to be apprentices in the workforce rather than in school. Although the legal age for these apprenticeships is supposed to be 15 it is believed that there are much younger children involved in the workforce. Children who live in rural parts of the country are at a disadvantage and usually work in agriculture instead of attending school. There is a focus on increasing enrolment among Senegalese girls, although in the past few years enrolment rates have elevated.

== The 'Case des Tout-Petits' experience ==
The health and social status of children in Senegal is unfavourable and despite serious efforts the protection of children remains of great concern. In reaction to this situation, Senegalese national authorities now consider early childhood care a priority for development. Since 2002, the 'Case des Tout-Petits', a new model for the development of children in their early years, has coexisted alongside the various structures of formal, non-formal and informal pre-school education. While there is room for improvement, the programme is a valuable community-based experience grounded in local cultural traditions.

The 'Case des Tout-Petits' is a community structure for the support of children aged from 0 to 6. The case, or traditional house, connotes a lifestyle, a way of being and thinking, and symbolizes a commitment to African values. The case as a living, socialized, educational place par excellence is considered the starting point for the child's learning in life.

These 'cases' were primarily designed for disadvantaged and rural milieus to guarantee access to adequate and integrated services. They are run by the people themselves and represent some 20% of Senegal's early childhood structures. Architecturally, the 'Case des Tout-Petits' is a hexagonal structure comprising two rooms, one for the children's educational activities and the other for parental education. These structures develop a comprehensive and holistic approach to childhood care that includes education, health and nutrition programmes.

While participation is not free, fees are lower than in other early childhood care structures within the formal sector. The financial participation is symbolic and allows families to work in synergy around a common good that belongs to the community and that the community is expected to preserve.

== Sources ==
This article incorporates text from a free content work. Licensed under CC-BY-SA IGO 3.0 (license statement/permission). Text taken from Rethinking Education: Towards a global common good?, 46, Box 8, UNESCO. UNESCO.

This article incorporates text from a free content work. Licensed under CC BY-SA 3.0 IGO. Text taken from Funding skills development: the private sector contribution, UNESCO, UNESCO. UNESCO.
