= Vicky Colbert =

Colombian sociologist

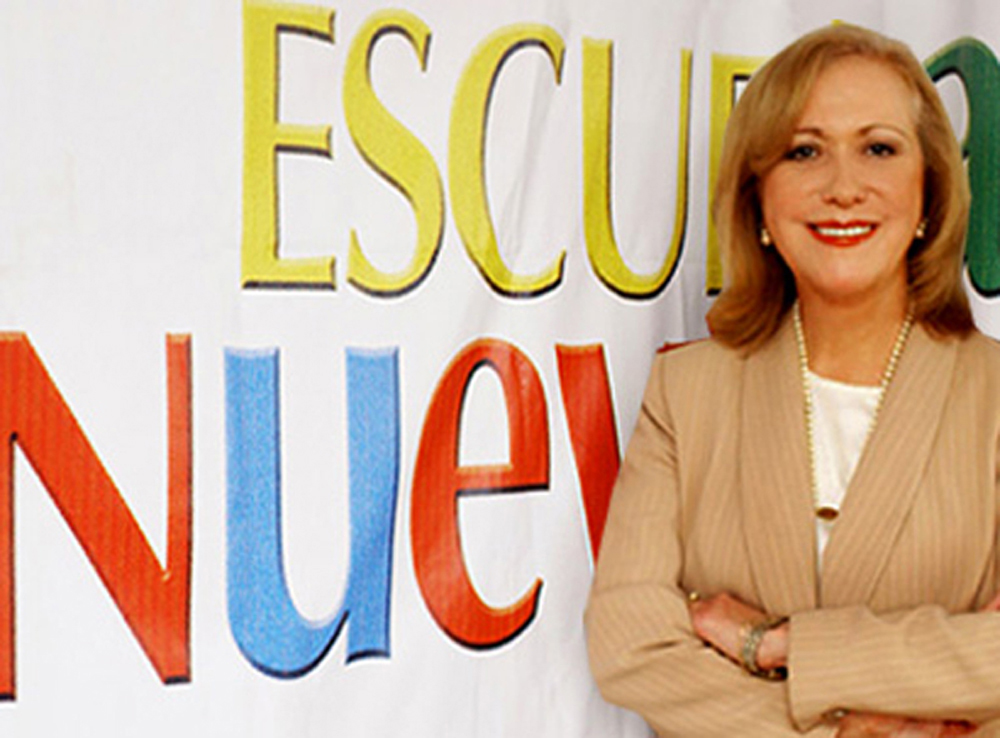
Vicky Colbert is now Executive Director of Escuela Nueva Foundation

Vicky Colbert (born Clara Victoria Colbert de Arboleda; 1948/1949) is a Colombian social entrepreneur.

She has served as Colombia's Vice-Minister of Education, and is the founder and current Executive Director of Escuela Nueva Foundation. She has won numerous awards for her work. In 2013 she received the Wise Prize for Education from the Qatar Foundation and in September 2017 she won the Yidan Prize for Education Development from the Yidan Prize Foundation.

== Life ==
Colbert came from a family with a strong interest in education reform. Her godfather had been Colombia's minister of education, and her mother was a teacher who also founded teacher training colleges. Her father was an officer in the U.S. Navy.

A Ford Foundation scholarship allowed her to study comparative education as a graduate student at Stanford University. She then returned to Colombia where "I wanted to tackle basic education and work with the poorest of the poor schools, the isolated schools." She went to work in rural Colombia, where many families grow coffee. Children frequently dropped out of school to help on the family farm during harvest season, which created problems if they returned to class much later. A related problem was that rural teachers often taught several grade levels in a single classroom. She saw the need to structure a system of education that was flexible enough to accommodate such schedules. In the mid-1970s she worked with others, notably co-founders Oscar Mogollón and Beryl Levinger, to devise the model known as Escuela Nueva.

A key element of the Escuela Nueva school is that children learn at their own rate by using Learning Guide, which Colbert describes as "a combination of a textbook, workbook and a guide for the teacher". These guides suggest hands-on activities for students to do both in school and at home. Students work their way through the guide at their own pace, with teachers serving as advisers, and students who have mastered a lesson often helping those who have not.

Inspired by the work of John Dewey, Maria Montessori, and other progressive educators, the schools are also democratic in spirit, with teachers, students, and parents all involved in decision-making.

It took many years of effort for the Escuela Nueva model to become widespread throughout Colombia, but it is now used in 20,000 schools in that country. Colbert noted that "it's not just governmental support but also ground support that is needed to influence change in the education system". It has continued to spread and Escuela Nueva schools are now in 19 countries including Brazil, the Philippines and India.

== Recognition ==
She was recognized as one of the BBC's 100 women of 2017.
