= Angeline Murimirwa =

Zimbabwean feminist and executive director

- Born: Angeline Mugwendere; 1980 (age 45–46); Denhere, Zimbabwe
- Known for: Chief Executive Officer for CAMFED in Africa

Angeline Murimirwa (née Mugwendere) is a Zimbabwean feminist, who is currently the chief executive officer for CAMFED in Africa. Murimirwa was included in the TIME 100 list of the world's most influential people of 2025.

== Career ==
Born in 1980, Murimirwa grew up in Denhere in rural Zimbabwe. In the 1990s, she was one of the first girls to be given a scholarship by CAMFED for her secondary school education, which included monetary support, her school uniform, shoes and schooling equipment.

Before her appointment as Executive Director – Africa, Murimirwa worked as the regional executive director for CAMFED in Southern & Eastern Africa. In 1998, Murimirwa helped set up the CAMFED Association (CAMA), which began with a few hundred women. By the beginning of 2025, there were 312,747 members. In 2005, Murimirwa presented at a Global Exchange forum, and in 2006, she was awarded the prize for Women's Creativity in Rural Life by the Women's World Summit Foundation. Murimirwa was featured in the 2009 book Half the Sky by Pulitzer Prize winning novelists Sheryl WuDunn and Nicholas Kristof. In 2014, she spoke at an event with Michelle Obama. In 2016, Murimirwa attended a CAMFED event where Julia Gillard, former Prime Minister of Australia, became a patron of the organisation. During the event, Murimirwa stated that "Locally tailored solutions, respectful of context and building on local resources, are key to our success." In 2017, Murimirwa was included in the 2017 BBC 100 Women list of the most influential women and she was awarded the 2017 Diamond Ball Honors Award by the Clara Lionel Foundation. At the event, Murimirwa spoke about her personal journey from poverty to her current role at CAMFED, and Murimirwa dedicated the award to the "100,000 CAMFED Association members". The event was attended by celebrities including Dave Chappelle, Rihanna, Kendrick Lamar, and Calvin Harris. In 2018, during a Royal Visit to Zambia, Prince Harry met with Murimirwa. In 2019, Murimirwa delivered her first TED Talk: "How repaying loans with social service transforms communities." In 2020, Murimirwa was awarded the Yidan Prize for Education Development for promoting development of education. In 2023, she delivered her second Ted Talk: "School is just the start. Here's how to help girls succeed for life." In 2024, Murimirwa was named the winner of the Africa Education Medal 2024, recognizing her as an extraordinary leader, working tirelessly to transform African education.

== Personal life ==
Murimirwa is married with four children.
