= David Klahr =

American psychologist (1939–2026)

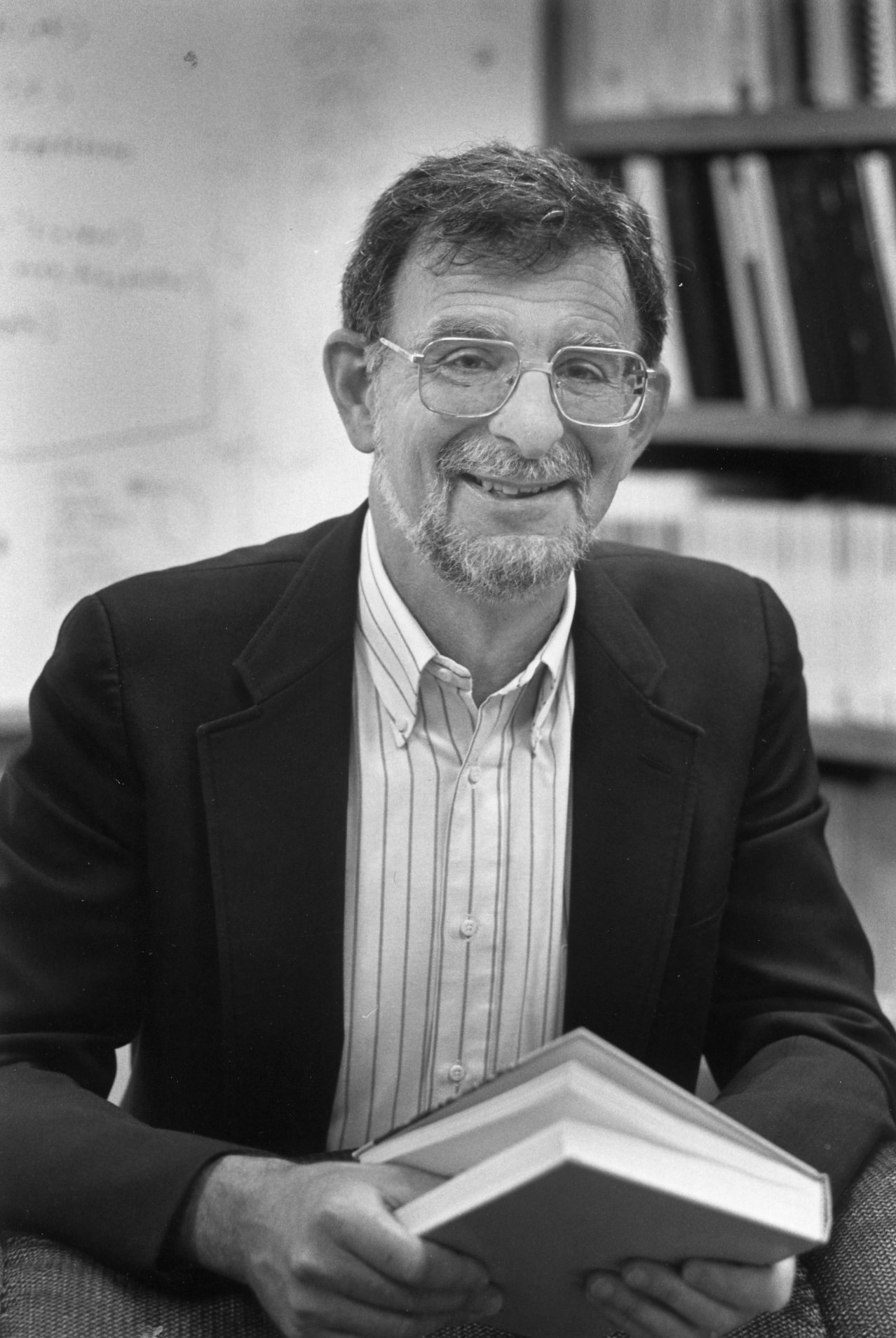
- Born: July 9, 1939; Springfield, Massachusetts, U.S.
- Died: April 26, 2026 (aged 86); Pittsburgh, Pennsylvania, U.S.
- Known for: Computational models of cognitive development Dual space search theory of scientific reasoning Member of the National Academy of Education
- Scientific career
- Fields: Developmental psychology Cognitive psychology Cognitive development Psychology of science Educational psychology
- Workplaces: Carnegie Mellon University

David Klahr (July 9, 1939 – April 26, 2026) was an American psychologist. His research focused on the fields of cognitive development, psychology of science, and educational psychology. He was a professor at Carnegie Mellon University from 1969. Klahr was the Walter van Dyke Bingham Professor of Cognitive Development and Education Sciences at Carnegie Mellon University and a member of the National Academy of Education, a Fellow of the American Psychological Association, a Charter Fellow of the Association for Psychological Science, on the Governing Board of the Cognitive Development Society, a member of the Society for Research in Child Development, and the Cognitive Science Society. He was an associate editor of Developmental Psychology and served on the editorial boards of several cognitive science journals, as well as on the National Science Foundation's subcommittee on Memory and Cognitive Processes, and the National Institutes of Health's Human Development and Aging Study Section.

Klahr served on three committees of the National Research Council: the Committee on Foundations of Educational Assessment (Knowing What Students Know, National Academies Press, 2001), the Committee on Research in Education (Advancing Scientific Research in Education, National Academies Press, 2004) and the Committee on Science Learning (Taking Science to School: Learning and Teaching Science in Grades K–8, National Academies Press, 2007). He also served as member of the advisory board for the Brain, Mind & Behavior Program of the James S. McDonnell Foundation.

== Background ==
Klahr received his undergraduate degree from MIT in electrical engineering (1960), and his Ph.D. in 1968 from Carnegie Mellon's Graduate School of Industrial Administration ("GSIA", now the Tepper School of Business) in Organizations and Social Behavior. From 1966 to 1969, he was an assistant professor at the University of Chicago with joint appointments in the School of Business and the Department of Mathematics. In 1968–69 was a visiting research fellow at the University of Stirling, Scotland, and a visiting Fulbright lecturer at the London School of Business. He returned to Carnegie Mellon University with joint appointment in GSIA and psychology in 1969, and became professor of psychology in 1976. He served as head of the Psychology Department from 1983 to 1993, and was director of the Program in Interdisciplinary Education Research (PIER), a doctoral training grant funded by the Office of Education.

Klahr died in Pittsburgh, Pennsylvania, on April 26, 2026, at the age of 86.

== Scientific contributions ==
Throughout his career, Klahr focused on the analysis of complex cognitive processes in such diverse areas as voting behavior, college admissions, consumer choice, peer review, problem solving and scientific reasoning. He pioneered the application of information processing analysis to questions of cognitive development, and, in collaboration with Iain Wallace, formulated the first computer simulation models to account for children's performance on a variety of Piagetian tasks and other types of problems.

Klahr's later research investigated the cognitive processes that support children's understanding of the fundamental principles underlying scientific thinking. This work includes both basic research with pre-school children and more applied classroom studies of how to improve the teaching of experimental science in elementary school. He worked in a wide variety of schools in the Pittsburgh region, focusing on the relative effectiveness of different instructional methods for teaching children how to design and interpret simple experiments.

== Bibliography ==
- 1966. A computer simulation of the paradox of voting, American Political Science Review, LX, 384–390
- 1976. (with J. G. Wallace). Cognitive Development: An Information-Processing View
- 1988. (with Kevin Dunbar). Dual space search during scientific reasoning, Cognitive Science, 12(1), 1–48
- 2000. Exploring Science: The Cognition and Development of Discovery Processes, Cambridge, MA: MIT Press
