= Escuela Nueva =

Escuela Nueva (Spanish for "new school") is an education model that emphasizes understanding over memorization and development of interpersonal skills. It originated in Colombia.

In an Escuela Nueva school, students learn independently, at their own pace. Typically a half-dozen students work at a table facing one another, rather than all facing the teacher. Much of the learning takes place through discussions among students and through guided independent work, with students who have mastered a subject helping those who are still learning it. The teacher offers advice and guidance as needed.

== History ==
Escuela Nueva was founded in the mid-1970s by Vicky Colbert, along with Beryl Levinger and Oscar Mogollón as co-founders. Colbert's family had a strong involvement in education. Her mother had set up teacher training colleges in Colombia and her grandfather had been Colombia's minister of education. Colbert spent 40 years spreading this education model. It is now used in about 20,000 rural schools in Colombia and 19 countries worldwide.

The system was developed for rural Colombian schools because they face special circumstances. In small communities, a one-room school might have students at many grade levels. Students often drop out for weeks or months to help on the family farm and have difficulty catching up. Students take exams when they feel ready.

== Elements ==
Students have guidebooks for subjects such as mathematics, language, science, and social science. These guides serve as textbooks; they also include activities that students can do in or out of school to supplement the book. For example, the learning guide might explain vaccines, then "instruct a child to go home and check that her baby sister has had all her shots, or go with her father to inspect the water cistern to see that it's covered to keep out insects."

Students actively participate in decisions about their education. David L. Kirp, the author of several books about education, reported that "the student council meticulously planned a day set aside to promote peace; operated a radio station; and turned an empty classroom into a quiet space for reading and recharging. I was there last Halloween, when students put on a costume contest for their pets."

Teacher training is a third critical element. Escuela Nueva teachers typically must operate in a way quite different from what they experienced as children, providing support for self-learners rather than being the source of all information. Teachers attend three week-long workshops each year and visit other Escuela Nueva sites to see the system in action.

== Recognition ==
As Kirp noted in his story, "Escuela Nueva is almost unknown in the United States," where the focus is more often on introducing technology into schools. Internationally, however, it has received wide acclaim. A UNESCO report in the 1990s concluded that it was because of Escuela Nueva that Colombia was the only country in South America where poor rural schools were providing a better education than city schools.

Colbert received numerous awards and citations, including the prestigious 2013 Wise Prize for Education, the first Clinton Global Citizenship Award, the Henry R. Kravis Prize in Leadership, and awards from the Skoll Foundation and Ashoka.

== See also ==
- Flipped classroom
