= Ghana-India Kofi Annan Centre of Excellence in ICT =

Advanced Information Technology Institute

Coordinates: 5°33′34.5″N 0°11′31.4″W

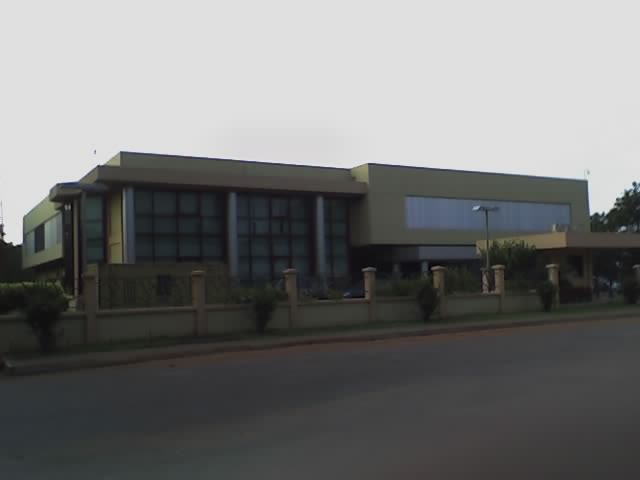

The Ghana-India Kofi Annan Centre of Excellence in ICT (AITI-KACE) is Ghana's first Advanced Information Technology Institute (AITI). It was established in 2003, through a partnership between the government of Ghana and the government of India.

The centre also houses West Africa's first supercomputer. The meeting and lecture rooms as well as the 802.11 wireless network guarantee that the AITI can host close to 1000 people at any given time.

== History ==
In August 2002, H.E. John Agyekum Kufuor, President of Ghana, went to India on a four-day state visit, to find business partners to invest and undertake joint ventures in Ghana. During that visit, the two Governments came to a bilateral agreement, to facilitate cooperation in the area of ICT. The Ghana-India Kofi Annan Centre of Excellence in ICT was created as a result.

India provided computer hardware, software and other communication equipment, training for instructors and the curriculum. Ghana provided the infrastructure and the administrative and technical staff.

AITI-KACE was launched on 9 December 2003.

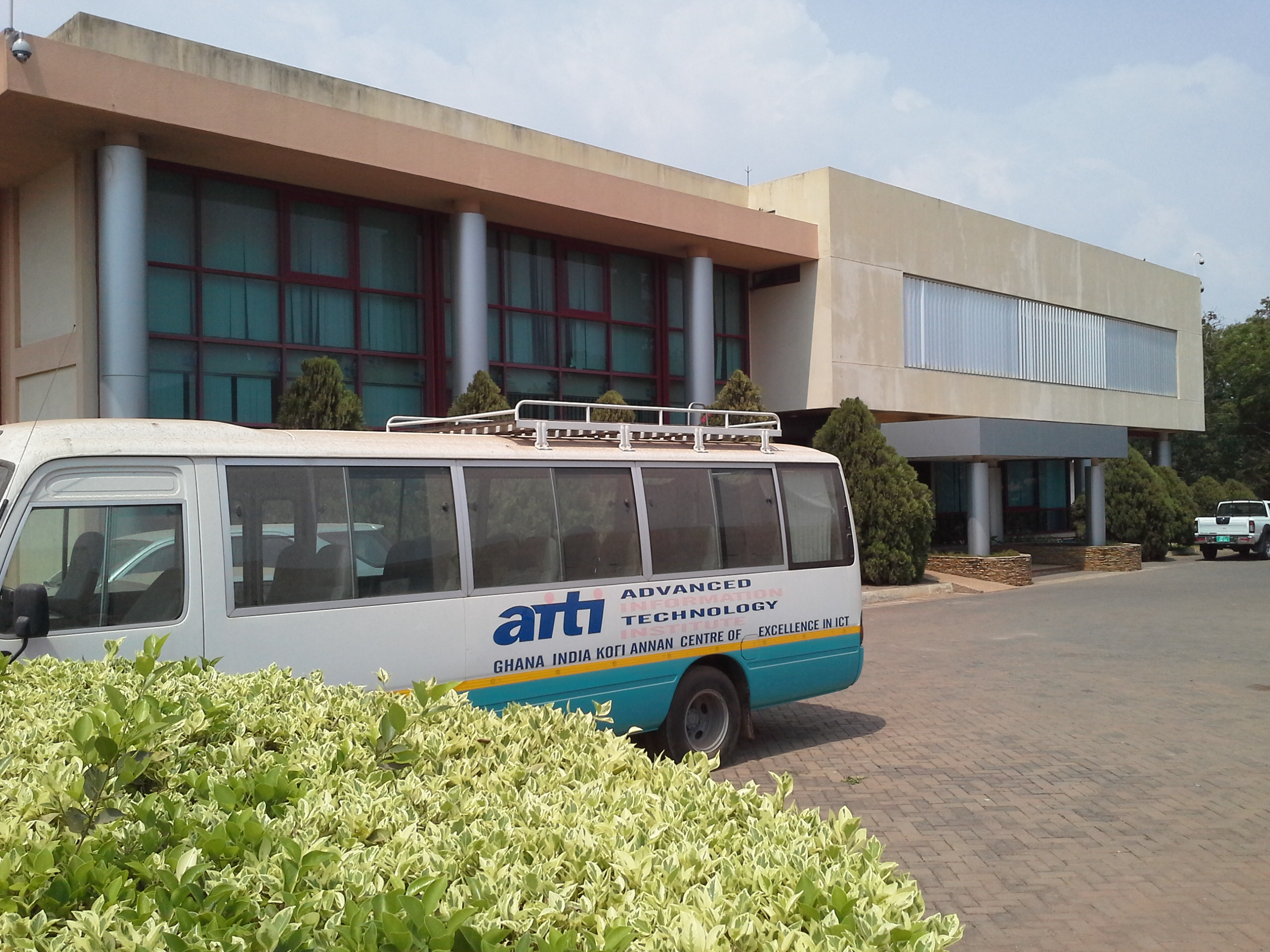
The main premises of AITI
