= Agara Lake =

Lake in Bengaluru

- Agaram Lake
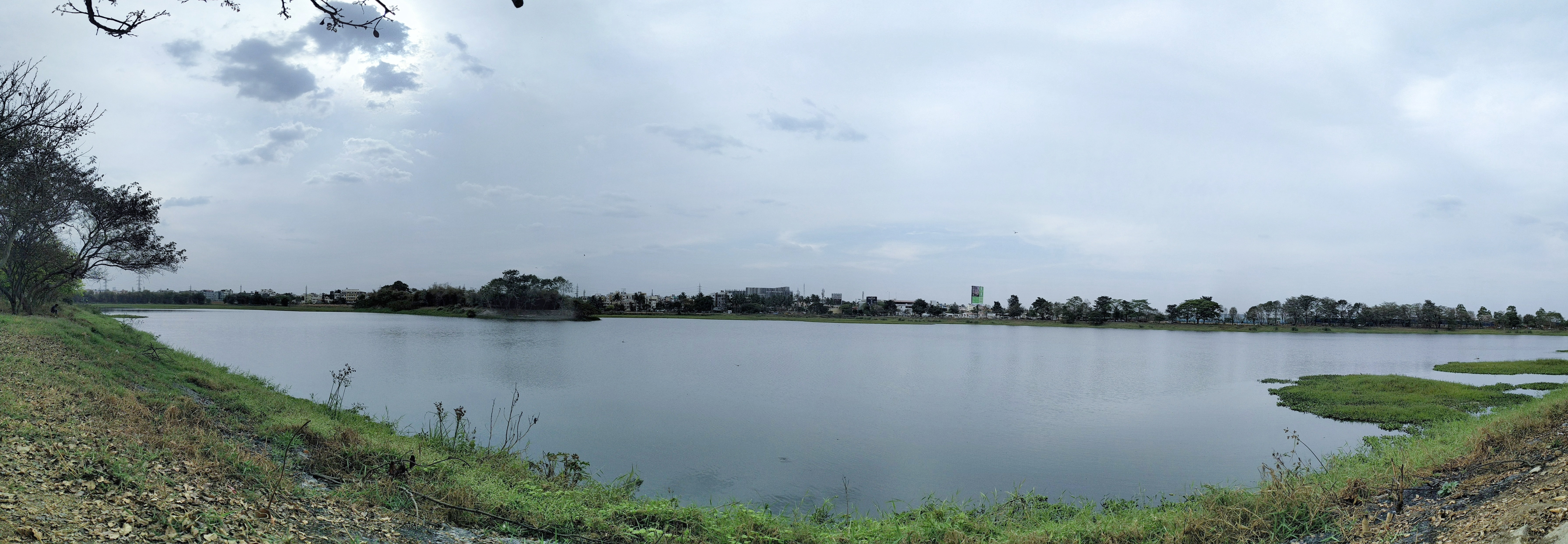
- 2016

- Location within Karnataka
- Location: Bangalore
- Group: Varthur lake series
- Coordinates: 12.921°N 77.641°E
- Type: Lake
- Catchment area: Surface runoff from urban surroundings and overflow discharge from Madiwala Lake.
- Managing agency: Karnataka State Forest Department, since 2018
- Built: 8-9th century
- Surface area: 80 acres (32 ha)
- Average depth: 6.5–9.8 ft (2.0–3.0 m)
- Shore length^{1}: 2.8 km (1.7 mi)
- Islands: 1
- ^{1} Shore length is not a well-defined measure.

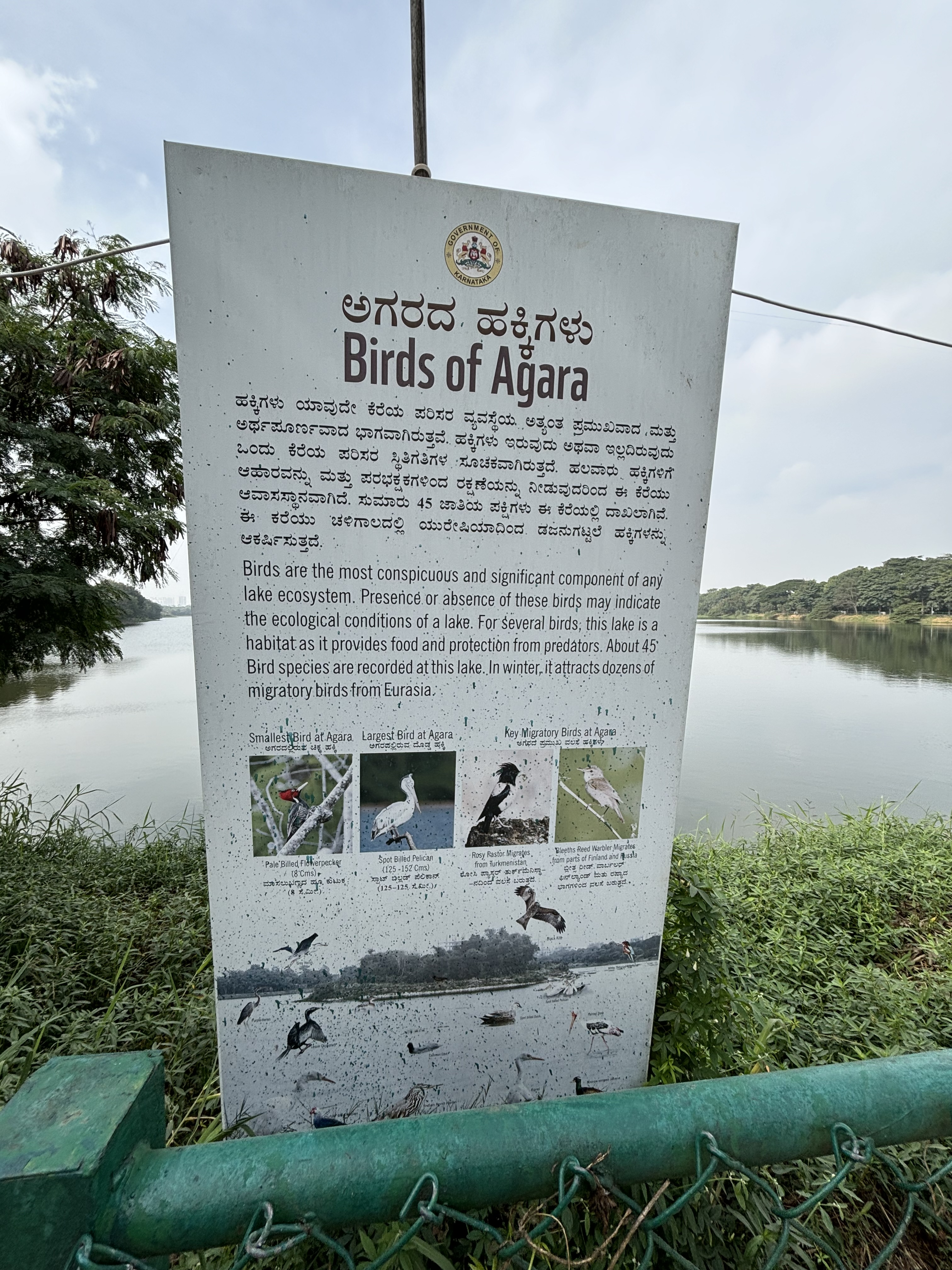
Birds of Agara

Agara lake is an 80-acre lake located in Agara, Bangalore. It is part of the Varthur lake series. Madiwala Lake is upstream while Bellandur Lake is downstream. Inter-lake connections have seen fragmentation and urbanisation.

Agara Lake is one of the most well maintained lakes of Bangalore. At the inflow end there is a partitioned constructed wetland and a sediment basin with a sluice. The lake is surrounded by a walking and cycling track. There is a park at the north end. An immersion tank has been built here. A storm water drain or rajakaluve flows immediately alongside the lake on its left side. The lake is surrounded by roads on all sides.

== Description ==
The lake dates back to at least the 8-9th century.

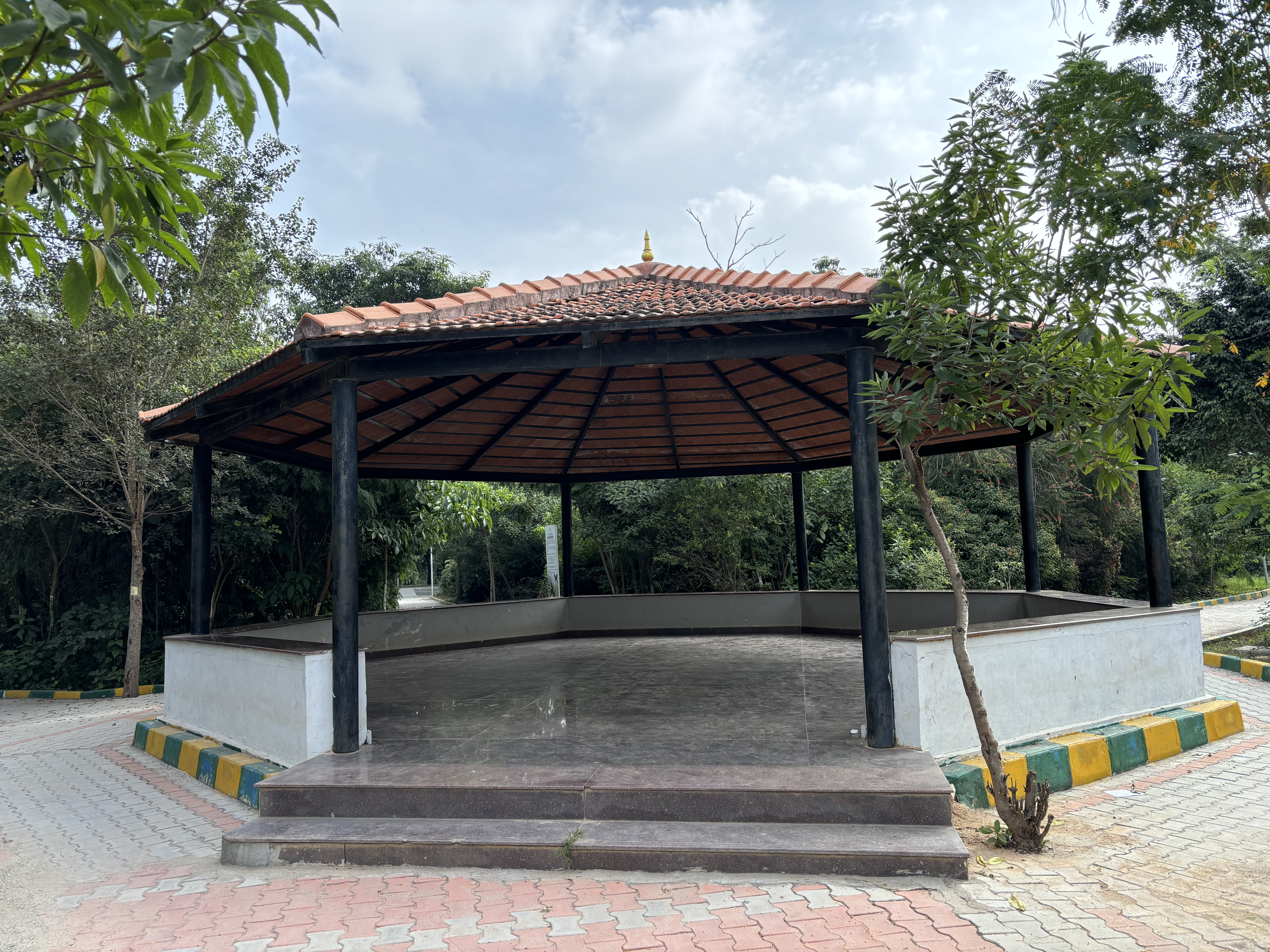
Gazerbo in Agara Lake Park

The lake is filled by overflowing water from Madivala lake, the surrounding catchment area, and a number of rajakaluves. Surplus water traditionally drained into Bellandur Lake. There is a storm water drain or rajakuluve between Bellandur and Agara lakes. The Agara-Bellandur region or wetlands provides an area for the primary outflow of Agara to flow towards Bellandur Lake via a stream network. This connection has seen fragmentation and urbanization. Land use changes from the 1970s have resulted in a decrease in surrounding water bodies.

From 1990s onwards the surroundings of the lake began to see construction. From traditionally being a community lake for those nearby including Agara village, the lake largely became a recreational public space.

In 2007 the lake was privatised. Following protests against the privatisation, the lease of the lake was cancelled. The private firm then filed a case against the administration. In 2012, the High Court directed a citizen group to manage the lake. A citizen group, the Agara Lake Protection and Management Society, was formed in 2013.

Agara Lake and vicinity

In 2004 restoration work was done on the lake by BDA and the forest department. Citizen initiatives to keep the lake in shape have spanned at least four years. In 2018, with a ₹16 crore (equivalent to ₹33 crore or US$3.4 million in 2023) grant from the state government, the Karnataka Lake Conservation and Development Authority began a de-weeding and desilting program. Surplus silt was used to increase the height of the encircling bunds. The lake has an immersion tank or kalyani that is disconnected from the main lake. The lake is fenced and surrounded by roads on all sides. A park has been created at one end and a walking path encircles the lake.

At the inflow end the lake has a constructed wetland covering 9 acres. Here permeable retention walls create partitioned areas. The partitioned areas allow time for silt to settle and the permeable walls act as filters. Before this system, a manual sluice gate had been installed to control inflow into the lake from a sedimentation area.

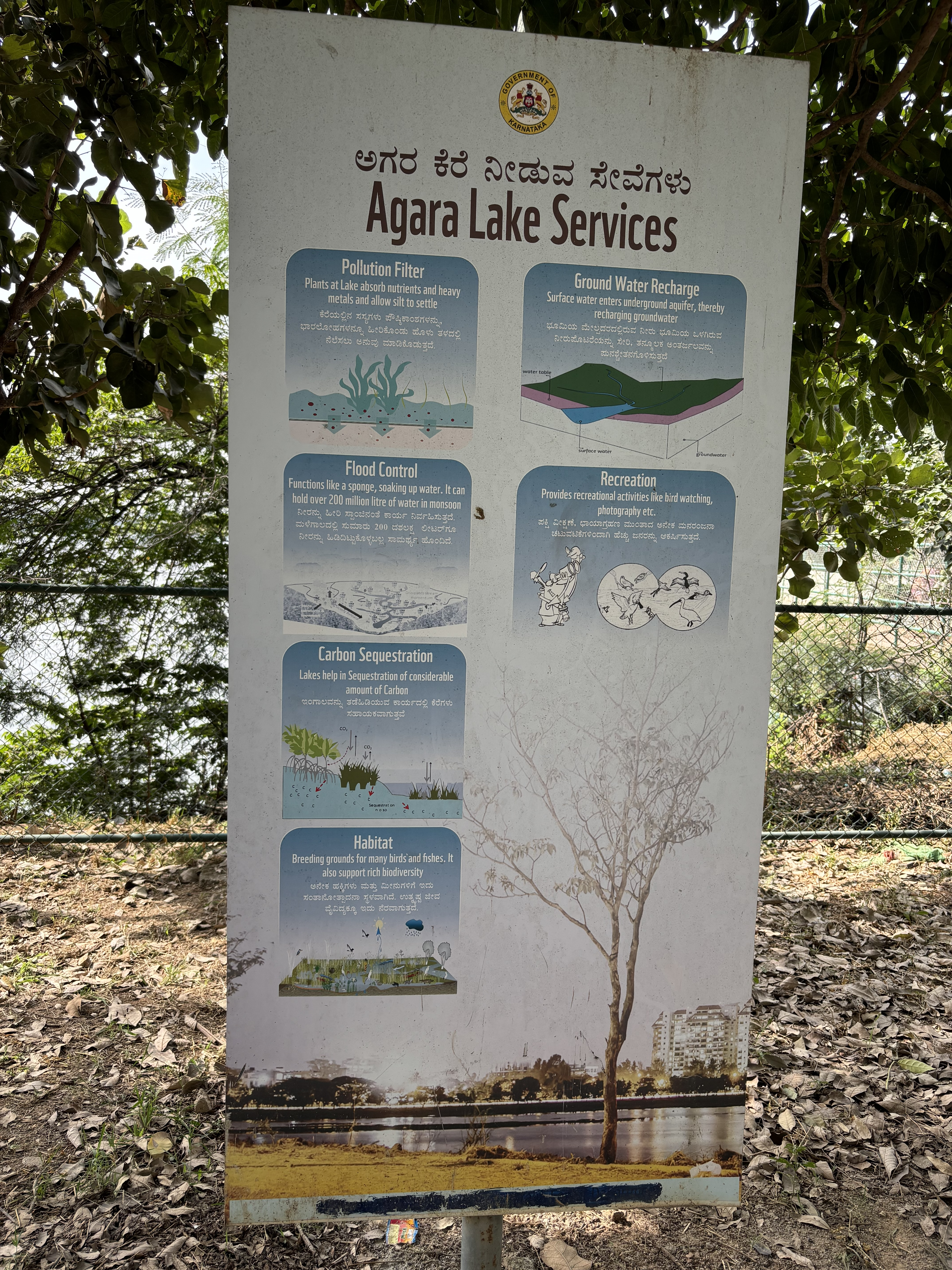
Services in Agara Lake

In 2018 bird watchers spotted 30 species of birds including Scaly-breasted munia and Red-naped ibis. A decrease in bird numbers was attributed to a number of factors. Fishing rights have been granted to select fisherfolk.

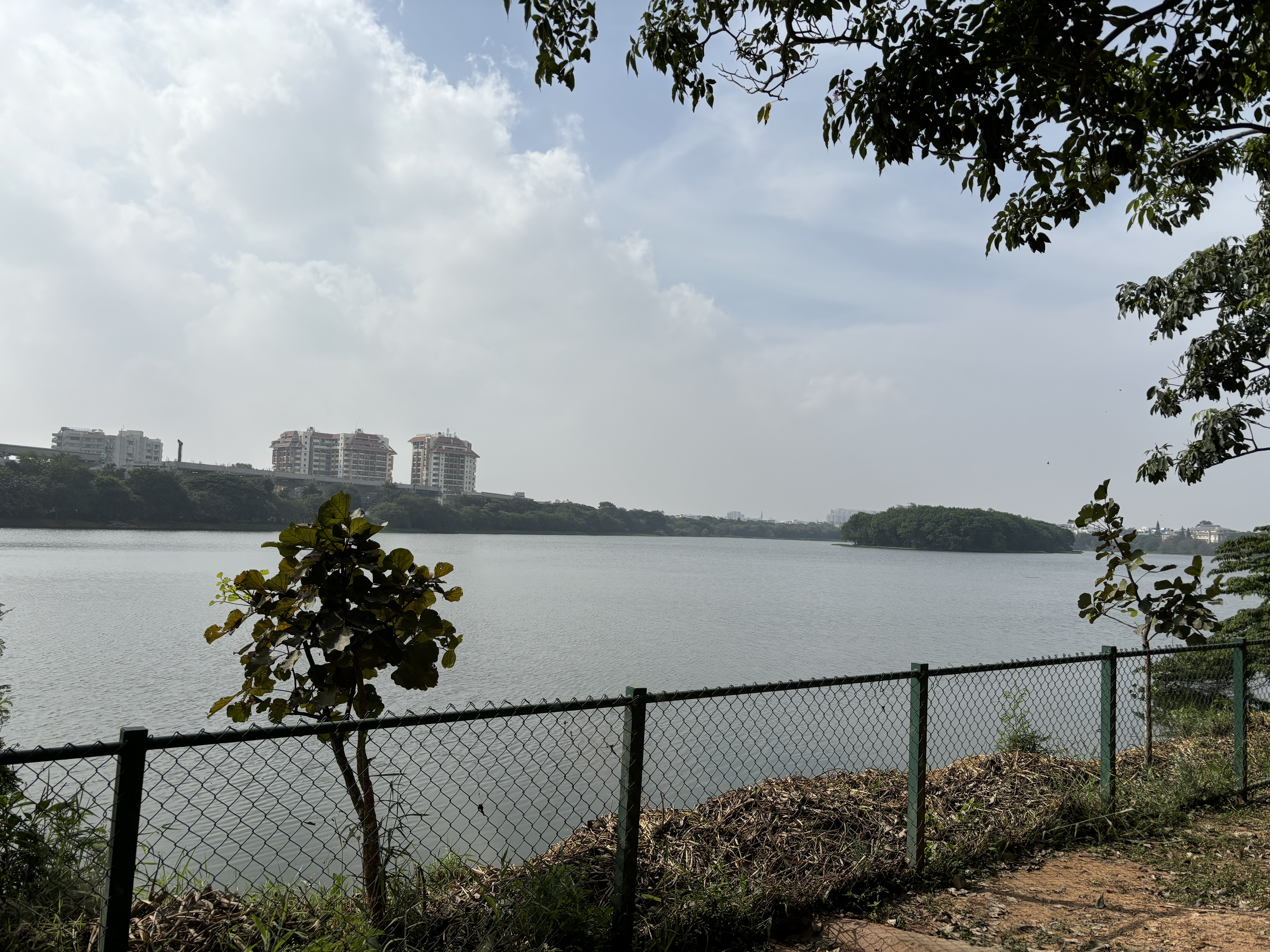
Agara Lake View
