= Yemalur =

- urban village
- Country: India
- State: Karnataka
- District: Bangalore Urban

Government
  - Type: Panchayat raj
  - Body: Gram panchayat

Languages
  - Official: Kannada
- Time zone: UTC+5:30 (IST)
- PIN: 560037
- ISO 3166 code: IN-KA
- Vehicle registration: KA-53
- Lok Sabha constituency: Bangalore Central
- Vidhan Sabha constituency: Mahadevapura
- Website: karnataka.gov.in

Yemalur is a village, about 14 km from Bangalore city in Southern India. It is situated between the HAL Airport of Bangalore and the Bellandur lake. The village has about 4000 inhabitants. Most of the local people have been living here since well before Bangalore became a major city.

The village was the birthplace of the renowned social worker and tribal activist, Dr. H. Sudarshan. In 2003, Karuna Trust (India) and Erin Foundation, two NGOs have collaborated to provide a primary health centre in this village.
