= Karuna Trust =

Karuna Trust may refer to:

- Karuna Trust (UK) - A UK-based charity working for deprived people in South Asia
- Karuna Trust (India) - An Indian charity working for deprived people in two Indian states, mainly in health care
