= Madiwala Lake =

Lake in Bengaluru

- IUCN category IV (habitat/species management area)
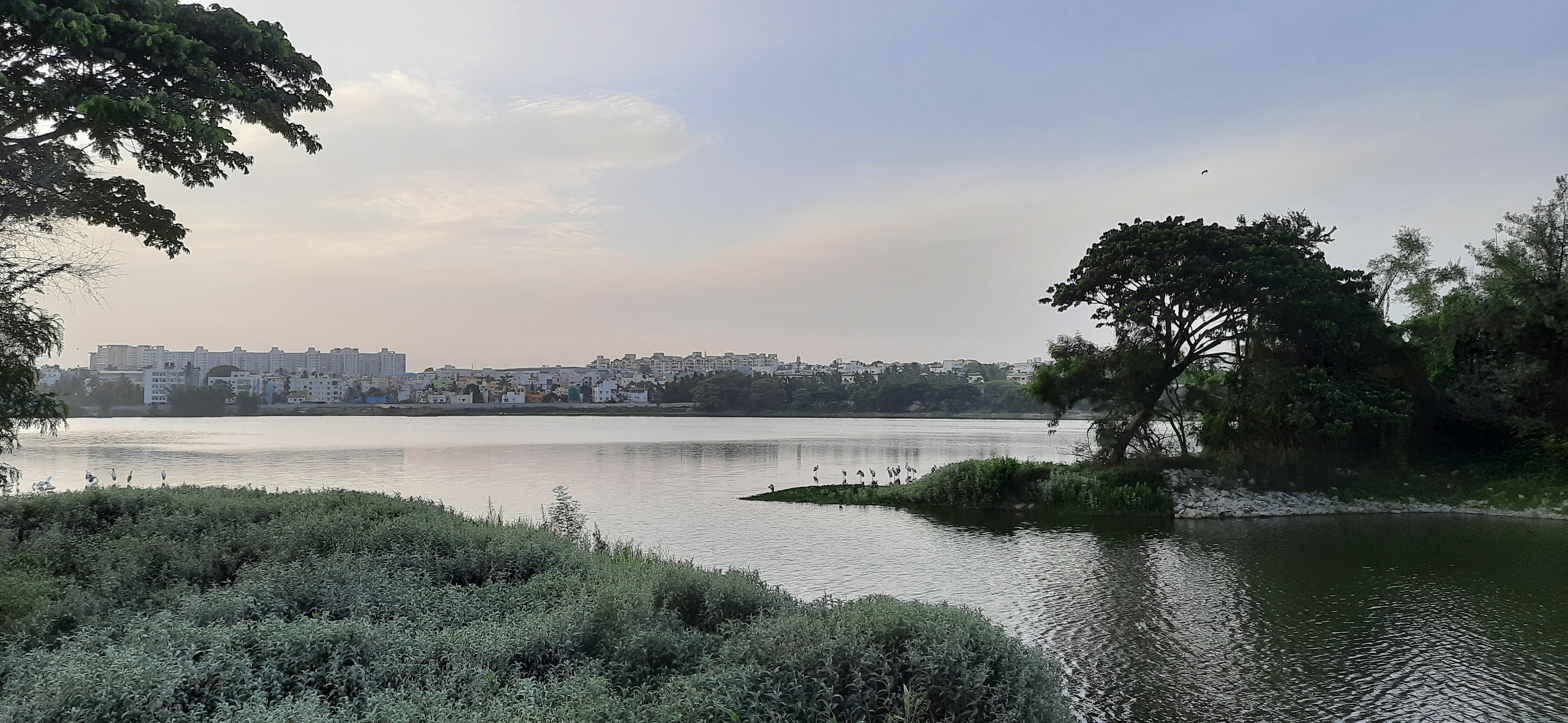
- Interactive map of Madiwala Lake
- Location: Madiwala, Bangalore, India
- Nearest city: Bangalore
- Coordinates: 12°54′21″N 77°36′53″E

Varthur Lake series, a part of the Koramangala-Challaghatta lake system. Disused/former lakes (yellow) and sewage treatment plants (red) related to the series marked.

Madiwala lake is one of the biggest lakes in Bangalore, India spread over an area of 114.3 hectare. The water in the lake was fit for drinking till the early 1990s. Since then it has become unfit for drinking due to industrial waste and sewage entering the waterbody. It has gradually become polluted.

It is situated in the BTM Layout at 12° 54' 28" North, 77° 37' 0" East in Bangalore city. It is a home to many migratory birds. The lake comes under the administration of Karnataka State Forest Department which carries out the routine maintenance of this lake. There is a children's park as well. The lake received a Rs 25 Crore grant in 2016 from the Lake Development Authority of Bangalore.

== Lake Habitat ==
=== Birds ===
The Madiwala lake sees a huge number of Spot-billed Pelican migration in the winter (November–December). These Spot-billed Pelicans live in groups. Their main food is fish. Pelicans take small flight across the lake for fishing. These migratory birds can also be sighted in Sri Lanka. They provide a great sight while landing. Typically their wing spans for about 8.5 feet. Egrets can also be sighted along with these birds.

== Gallery ==
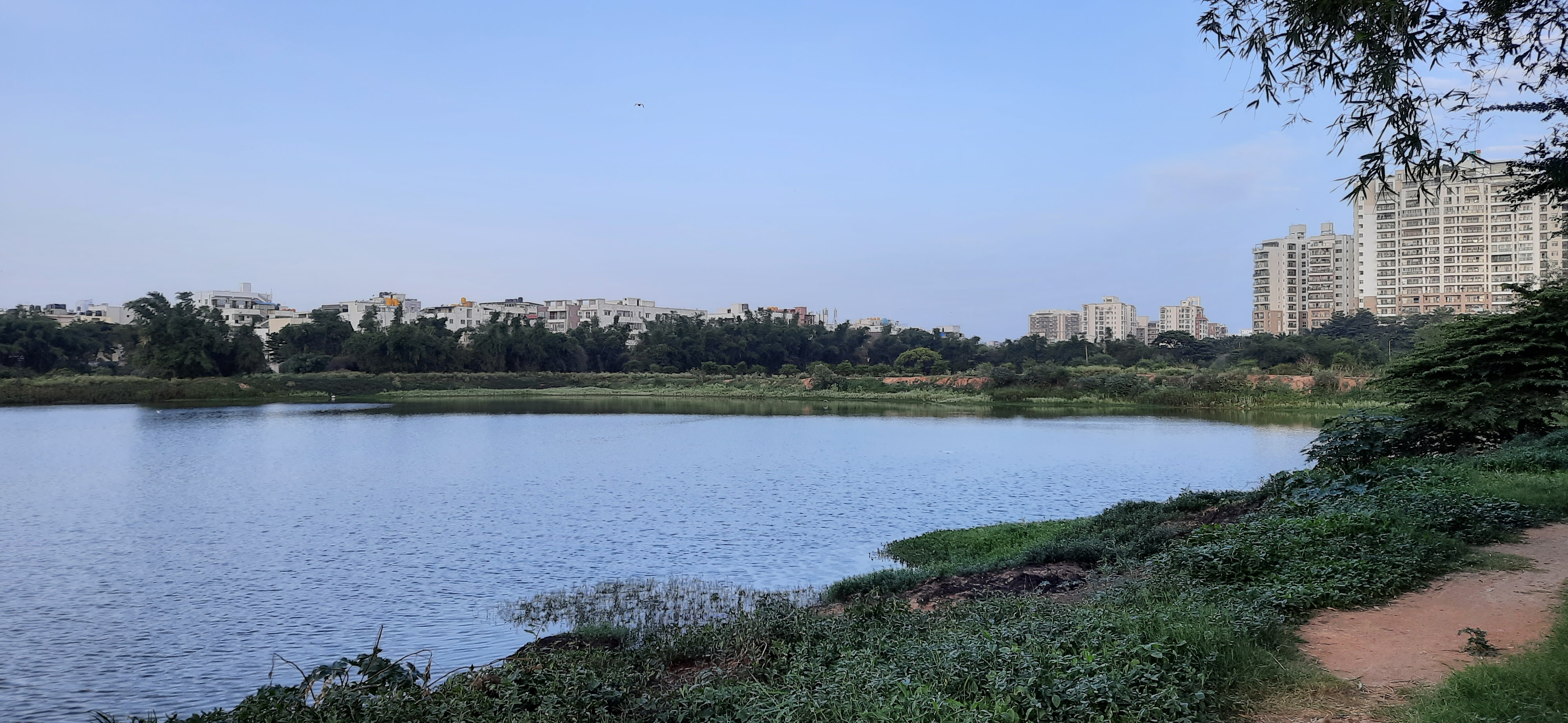
West Side View

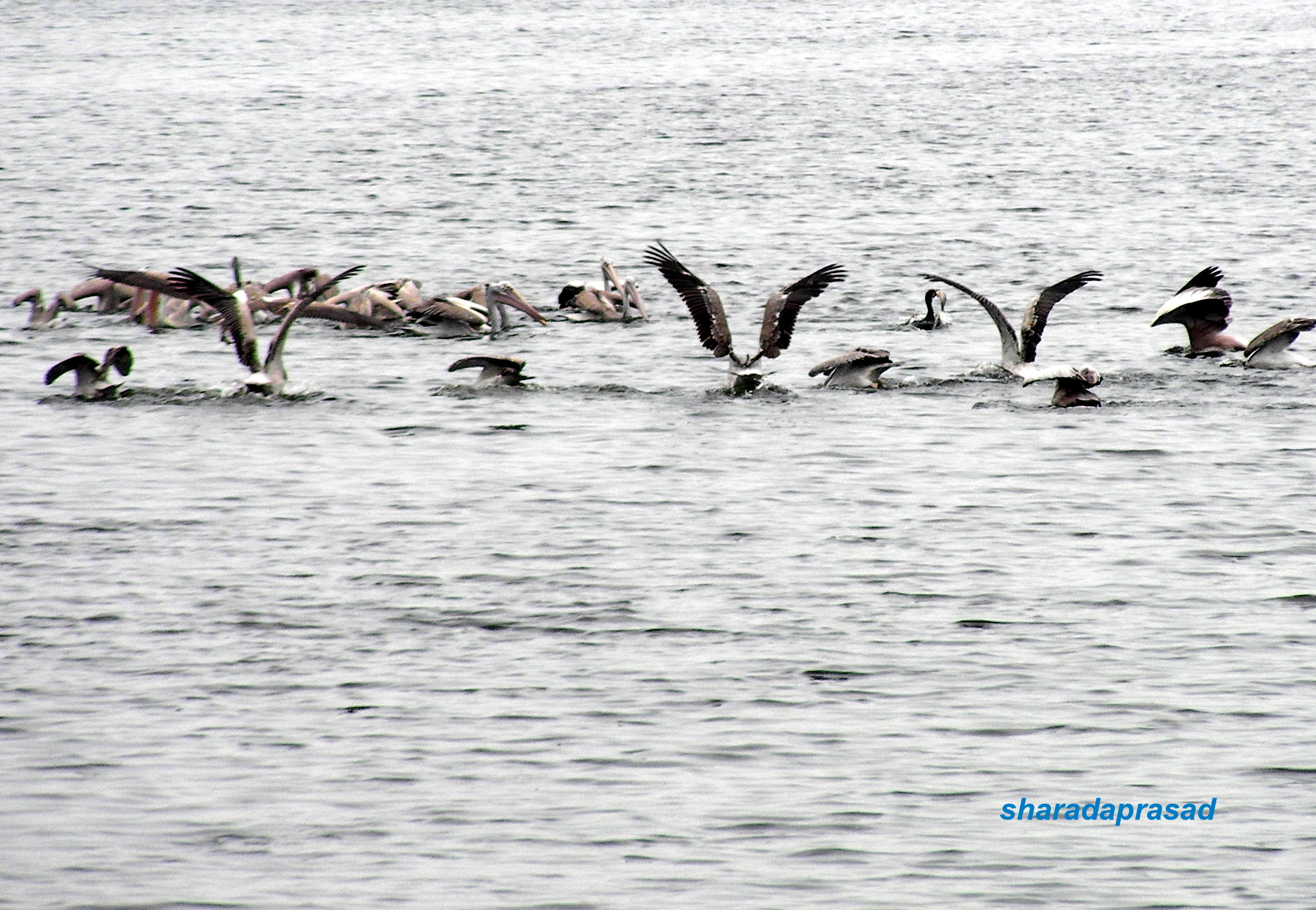
