= Hanumappa Sudarshan =

Indian social worker and tribal rights activist

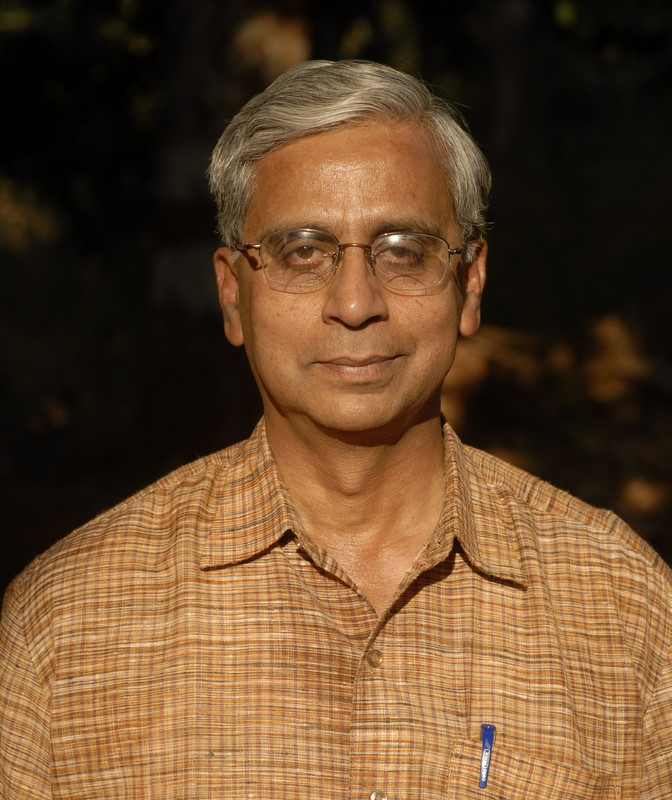
- Dr. Sudarshan, a well-known social worker and tribal activist recognised for his work with the Soligas in BR Hills
- Born: 30 December 1950 (age 75); Yemalur, Karnataka, India
- Other name: Dr. Sudarshan
- Occupation: Doctor
- Organization(s): Sudarshan Army, Karuna Trust (India)
- Known for: Public Health, Tribal rights, Activism, Gandhism
- Awards: Right Livelihood Award

Dr. Hanumappa Sudarshan (born 30 December 1950) is an Indian social worker and tribal rights activist. He is known for his contributions to the upliftment of the forest dwelling tribes (mainly Soligas) in the Chamarajanagar district of Karnataka. He is also a recipient of the Right Livelihood Award and the Padma Shri.

== Early life and education ==
Sudarshan was born in Yemalur on the outskirts of Bangalore. He graduated from Bangalore Medical College and became a medical doctor in the year 1973. He is also an adjunct professor at IGNOU.

== Career ==
After graduation, he joined the health institutions of Ramakrishna Mission which took him to the Himalayas of Uttar Pradesh, Belur Math in West Bengal and Ponnampet in Karnataka as part of the job. Instead of pursuing a medical practice in the cities, he decided to work with tribal communities and in 1980, he started the Vivekananda Girijana Kalyana Kendra for the integrated development of the tribals in the Chamarajanagar district of Karnataka. He is also the founder and Honorary Secretary of the Karuna Trust, which is dedicated to rural development in the states of Karnataka and Arunachal Pradesh. He claims inspiration from the man-making and nation-building ideals of Swami Vivekananda. He advocates Gandhian ideals for rural development.

== Sudarshan Army ==
Indian poet Shaunak Chakraborty got impressed by his ideology and work towards society so he decided to establish a non profit organization named Sudarshan Army on 30 July 2019 which got its name from him.

== Vivekananda Girijana Kalyana Kendra (VGKK) ==
VGKK is an organisation with a mission of Sustainable development of tribal people through rights-based approaches to health, education, livelihood security and biodiversity conservation. Founded in October 1981 by Dr. Sudarshan, VGKK has worked with tribals in the Chamarijanagar district and Mysore district of Karnataka and also with tribals in the states of Tamil Nadu, Arunachal Pradesh and the Andaman and Nicobar Islands and has interacted with about 20,000 people. The organisation has always had a tribal youth as its President. Jadeya Gowda, one of the first few children who was taught by Dr. Sudarshan, is the President. He did a graduation and post-graduation in agriculture and has completed his PhD from the [University of Agricultural Sciences, Bangalore], Presently working as Associate Professor at College of Forestry, Ponnampet.

VGKK runs a 450 pupil school for the tribes of B R Hills where the students are provided education equivalent to that provided in the urban areas. Subjects related to the tribal welfare such as environmental issues, tribal values and culture are also a part of the curriculum. VGKK also has a vocational training institute where 16 crafts are taught. As a result of the efforts of VGKK, about 60% of the Soliga tribe now get a minimum of 300 days of employment per year from the Forest Department of Karnataka and other agencies.

== Karuna Trust ==
Started in the year 1986 by Dr. Sudarshan, Karuna Trust (India) is an organisation involved with integrated rural development and is affiliated to VGKK. The prevalence of leprosy in Yelandur Taluk of Chamarajanagar district was the motivation to start this trust. Another focus area for this trust is education and livelihood improvement. Karuna Trust runs 72 Primary Health Care (PHC) Centres in all the districts of the state of Karnataka and Arunachal Pradesh.

== Positions held ==
Dr. Sudarshan has held many positions in his career such as the chairmanship of the Task Force on Health and Family Welfare organised by Government of Karnataka, the Task Force on Public Private Partnership organised by National Rural Health Mission (NRHM) of Government of India and Institute of Health management & Research (IHMR), Bangalore. He was also associated as a member of Working Group 6 on Macro-economics & Health organised by the World Health Organization and was also a Steering Group member of the Planning Commission on the Empowerment of Scheduled Tribes in India's 11th Five Year Plan. He has also been the Vigilance Director for the Karnataka Lokayukta, an ombudsman organisation. During his tenure, he adopted a method of regular visits and raids to several Government departments and earned critical acclaim for this.

== Awards ==
- Right Livelihood Award (1994), for showing how tribal culture can contribute to a process that secures the basic rights and fundamental needs of indigenous people and conserves their environment.
- Padma Shri Award (2000)
- Rajyotsava State Award for social work (1984) – Government of Karnataka.
- Ashoka Fellow.
- Mother Teresa Awards for Social Justice in 2014.

== See also ==
- Right Livelihood Award
- Albert Schweitzer
- Prakash Amte
