= Bellandur Lake =

Lake in the southeast Bengaluru

- ಬೆಳ್ಳಂದೂರು ಕೆರ (Kannada); ಯಮಲೂರ ಕೆರೆ (Kannada)
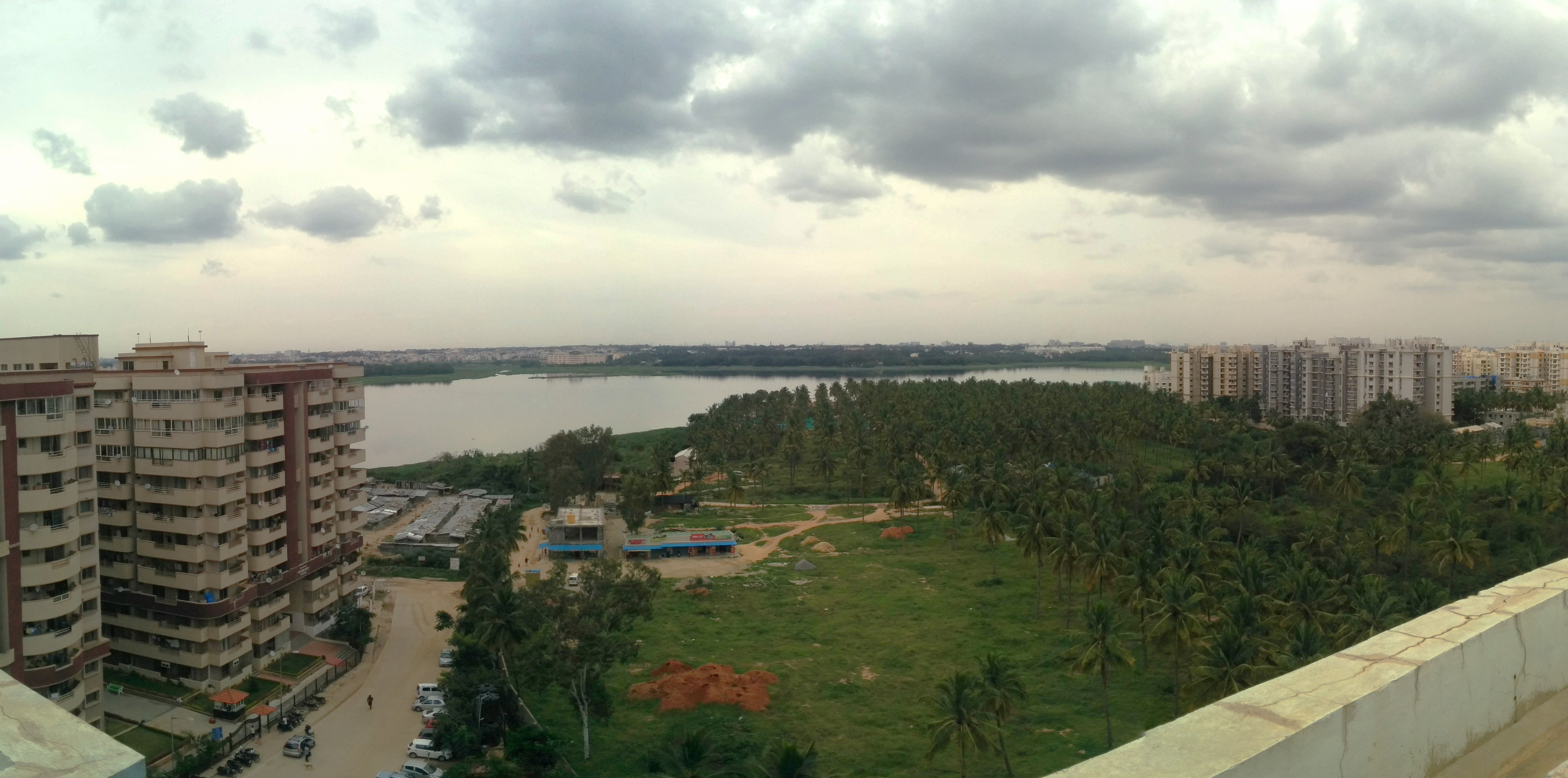

- Location within India Location within Karnataka
- Location: Bellandur, Bengaluru, Karnataka, India
- Group: Varthur Lake Series
- Coordinates: 12°56′3″N 77°39′46″E
- Type: Lake, aquatic eco-system
- Part of: Koramangala-Challaghatta lake system
- Primary inflows: Drain inlets - Ejlpura, Agara, Challaghatta, Iblur
- Primary outflows: Varthur Lake
- Catchment area: 148–287 km^{2} (57–111 sq mi)
- Max. length: 3.6 km (2.2 mi)
- Max. width: 1.4 km (0.87 mi)
- Surface area: 812–919 acres (329–372 ha)
- Average depth: 2 m (6 ft 7 in)
- Max. depth: 9 m (30 ft)
- Surface elevation: 870 m (2,850 ft)
- Settlements: Begur, Agara, Yemalur, Varthur

Varthur Lake series, a part of the Koramangala-Challaghatta lake system. Disused/former lakes (yellow) and sewage treatment plants (red) related to the series marked.

Bellandur Lake is located in the suburb of Bellandur in the southeast of the city of Bengaluru. It is the largest lake in the city. It is a part of Bellandur drainage system that drains the southern and the south-eastern parts of the city. The lake is a receptor from three chains of lakes upstream, and has a catchment area of about 148 square kilometres (37,000 acres). Water from this lake flows further east to the Varthur Lake, from where it flows down the plateau and eventually into the Pinakani river basin.

== History ==
Bellandur Lake is believed to be originally a tributary of the Dakshina Pinakini river (also known as the Ponnaiyar River). Old narratives cover village watermen, deities, cultural practices, and attached commons that provided wood and land for grazing. In the 1940s, the lake was used for landing amphibious aircraft such as the Catalina.

The impact of urbanisation goes back to 1980s when unplanned growth broke the chain of tanks and lakes feeding Bellandur lake. This reduced the amount of rain water reaching the lake to recharge it. The development also resulted in letting in untreated sewage water from housing societies and using the lake surrounding area to dump solid waste. Industries also started dumping their waste into the lake. The combination of all these factors has resulted in a decrease in living standards for neighboring areas. The presence of industrial chemicals in the water from nearby industrial unites causes the lake surface to catch fire regularly. Froth has been associated with the lake since at least 2003.

Farmers, activists, local government representatives and residents have been involved in a variety of diverse issues related to the lake, including construction of a road and cleanliness. In 1997, when Bellandur lake was declared unfit for water sports during National Games, was the first time it drew media attention to the issue. The matter has also been taken to court. A PIL in 1999 highlighted the inaction to protect the environment and lakes. The High Court ordered the local administration to provide proper sewage network in the city to stop sewage from entering lakes. When the court order was not followed, the petitioners filed a contempt case. The High Court referred the case to Lok Adalat. In 2002, Lok Adalat directed all government departments including BBMP, BDA, BWSSB, Minor Irrigation, KSPCB and Revenue Department to form a committee and look into the status of Bellandur Lake. A complication is that the lake is under multiple civic bodies.

In 2000, resident association groups of Koramangala joined in and started lobbying with the government to stop mixing of sewage in storm water drains. Right to Information activists, in search of information related to encroachments and dumping, have filed a number of applications related to the lake. Members of the Legislative Assembly have also taken up the issue. Several citizens have formed pressure groups. Efforts have included online petitions and campaigns and use of the social media. In 2015 a Rajya Sabha member filed a PIL in the High Court of Karnataka. In March 2017, the state government invited experts from the UK and Israel to help resolve environmental issues. In 2016 the National Green Tribunal stopped construction near Bellandur Lake and expanded the buffer zone around lakes. This was overturned by the Supreme Court in 2019.

The size of Bellandur lake, the scale of siltation and pollution associated with it, and uncertainty as to what exactly should be done to rejuvenate the lake has resulted in the lake failing to meet expected environmental standards for decades. Proposals such as removal of silt or translocation of sewage have been questioned. Major efforts include the construction of sewage treatment plants.

== Hydrology ==
Bellandur Lake is a major water body which is located in one of the three main valleys of Bengaluru. It forms a part of the Ponnaiyar River catchment, and water from Bellandur flows to Varthur Lake, ultimately joining the Pennar River.

The catchment area, water cover, average depth and maximum depth have all decreased over a number of years.

Millions of litres of untreated sewage is deposited in the lakes catchment area every day. In 2017, 2020 and 2021 new sewage water treatment plants were opened in the catchment area of the lake. There has been a loss in the number of upstream lakes connected to Bellandur Lake. Over the years it has seen failed rejuvenation efforts. This includes efforts at rejuvenating the lake without addressing upstream lakes. Bellandur lake has seen frothing in 2015, 2016, 2017, 2018, 2019. In 2015, 2017, 2018, 2021, parts of the lake caught on fire. In 2018 parts of the lake were on fire for over 30 hours. In 2022 Bellandur lake was one of a number of lakes which overflowed.

== Flora and fauna ==
Several species of birds are found, including the Grey heron, Purple heron, Indian pond heron, Intermediate egret, Cattle egret, Blyth's pipit, Grey wagtail, Western yellow wagtail, White-browed wagtail, Black kite, Brahminy kite, Western marsh harrier, Shikra, Wood sandpiper, Marsh sandpiper, Common sandpiper, Garganey, Northern shoveler, Northern pintail, Little grebe, Indian spot-billed duck, Black drongo, Ashy drongo, Spotted owlet, Blyth's reed warbler, Pied bushchat, Barn swallow, Red-rumped swallow, Ashy prinia, White-throated kingfisher, Asian koel, White-cheeked barbet, Common myna, Jungle myna, Spot-billed pelican, Indian shag, Great cormorant, Little cormorant, Black-headed ibis, Glossy ibis, House crow and Asian green bee-eater.

== Gallery ==
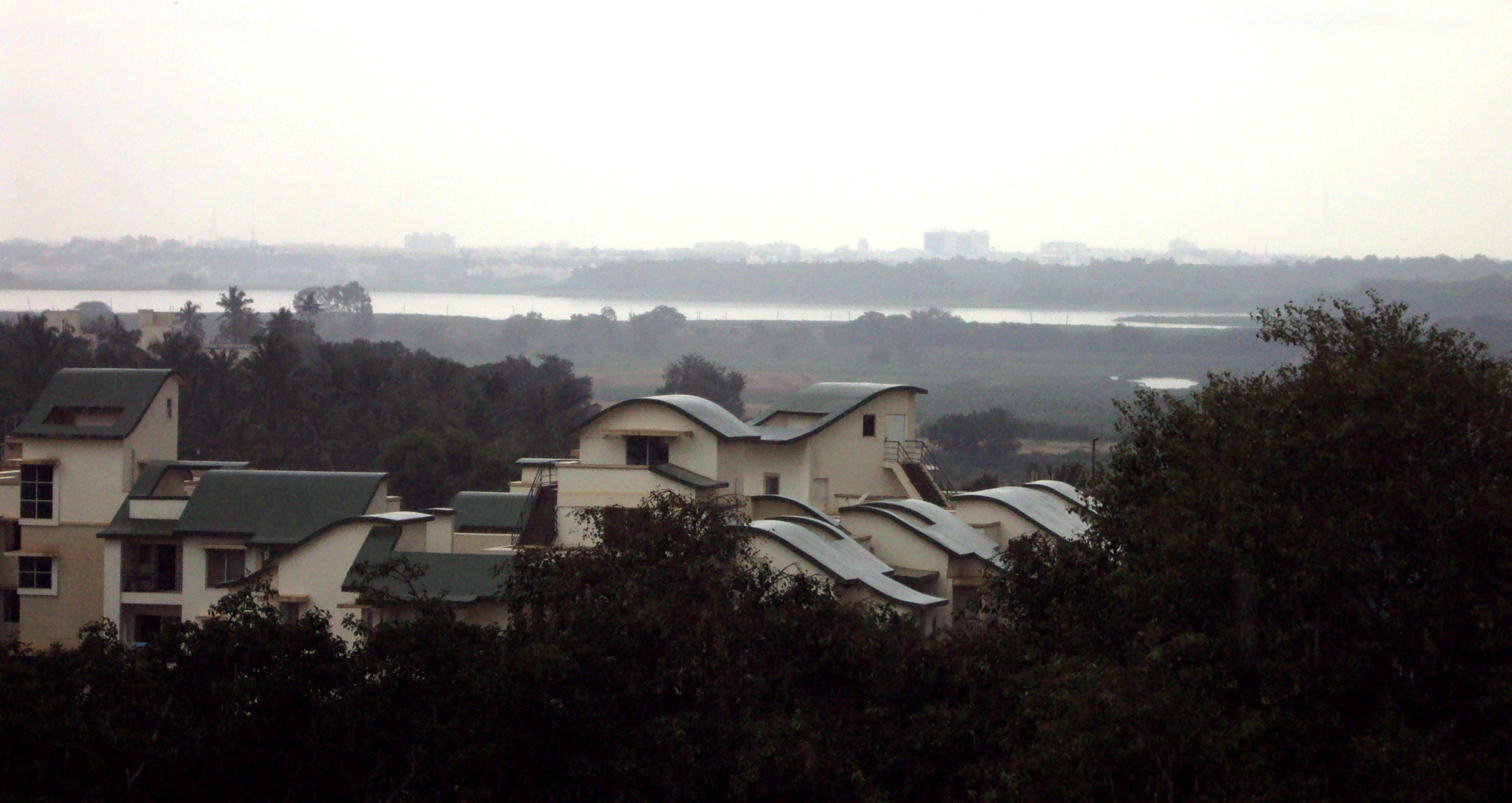
Humming Bird Suites and Bellandur lake seen from Top of Utopia

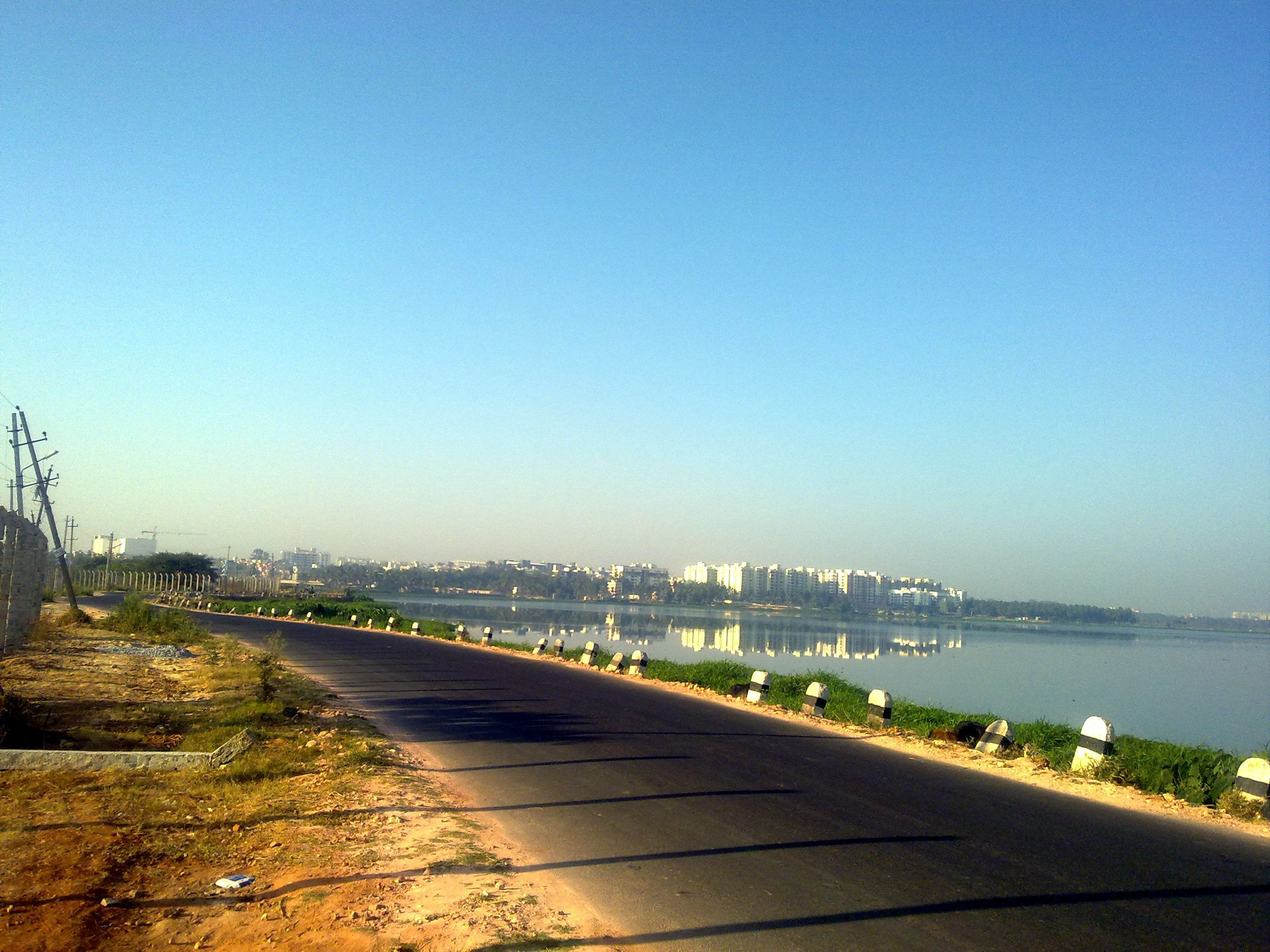
Bellandur Lake road

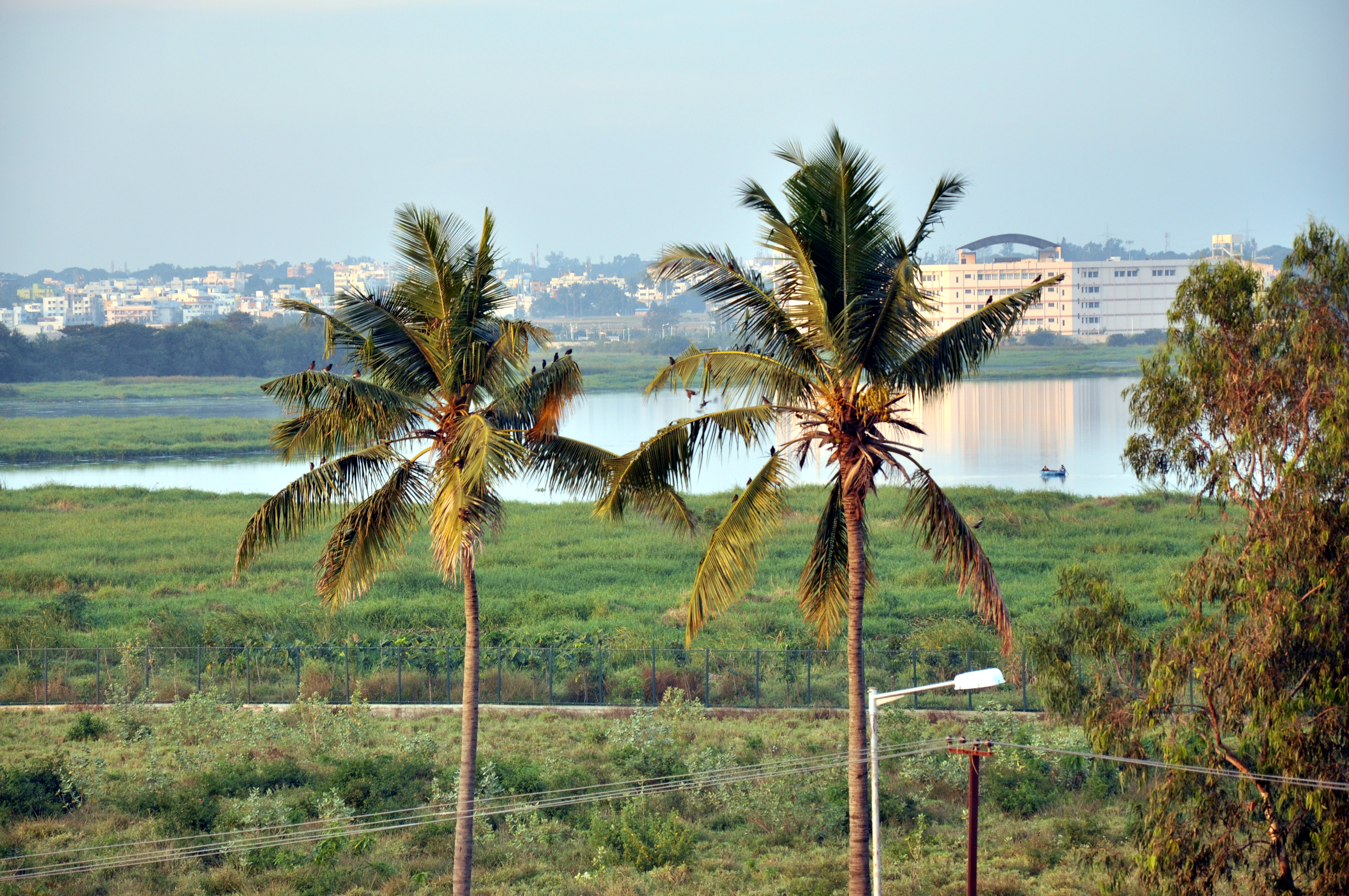
Lake Bellandur is being encroached upon by land sharks

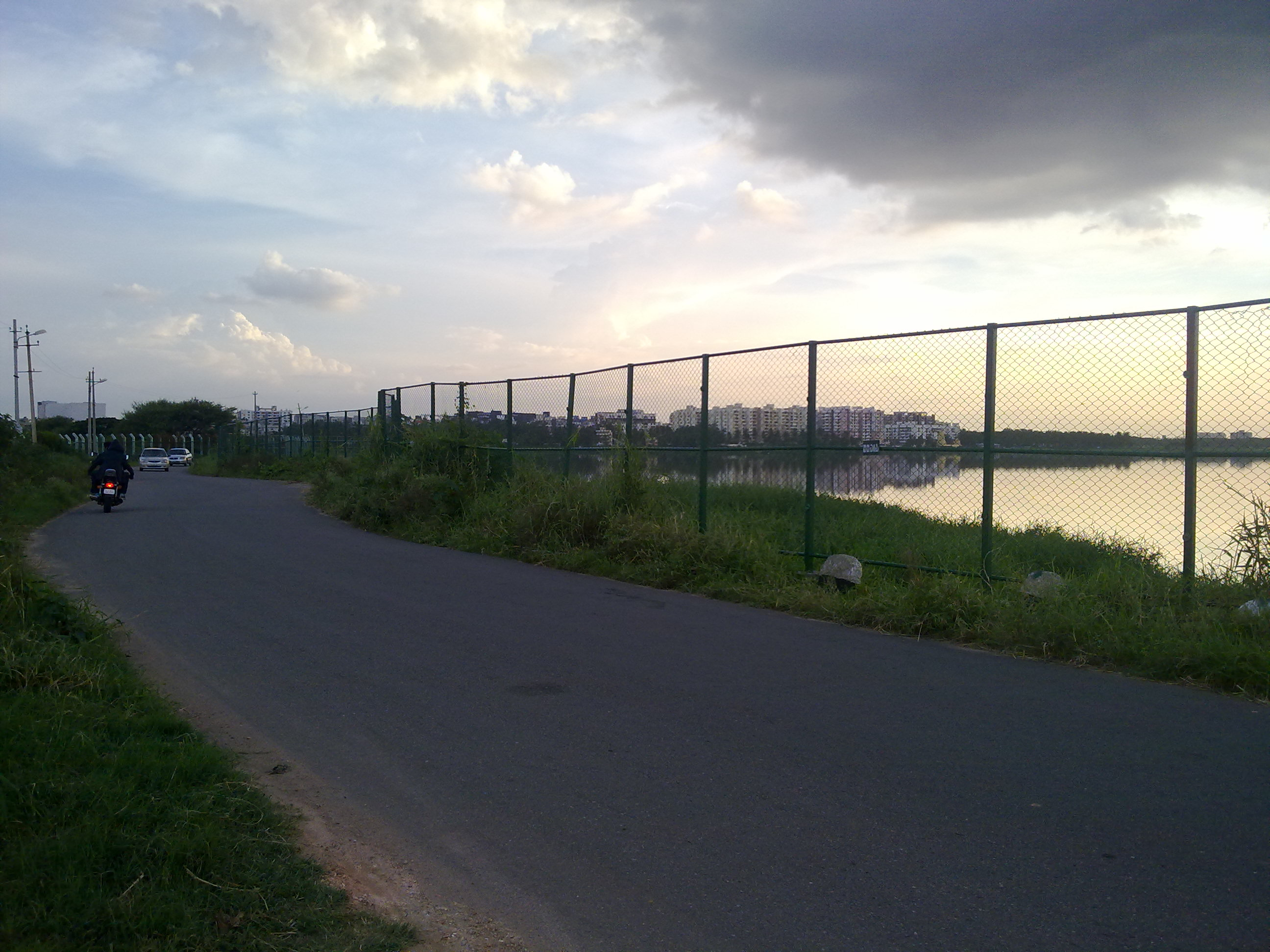
southeast of the city of Bangalore
