= Bellandur =

- Suburb
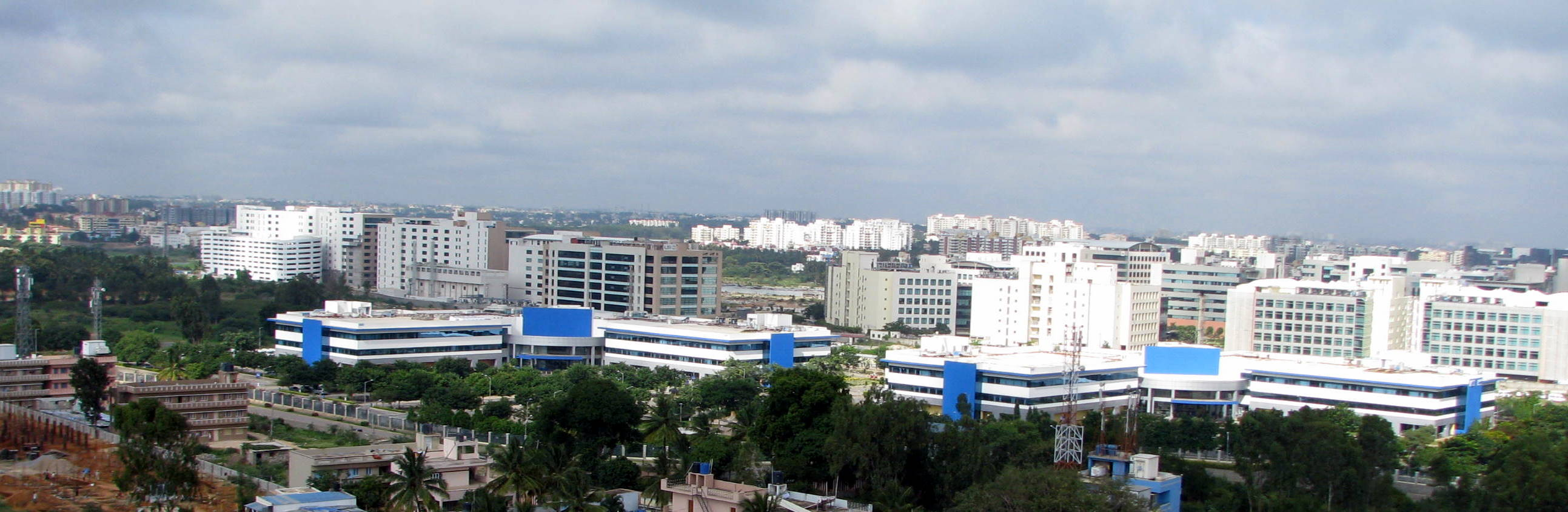
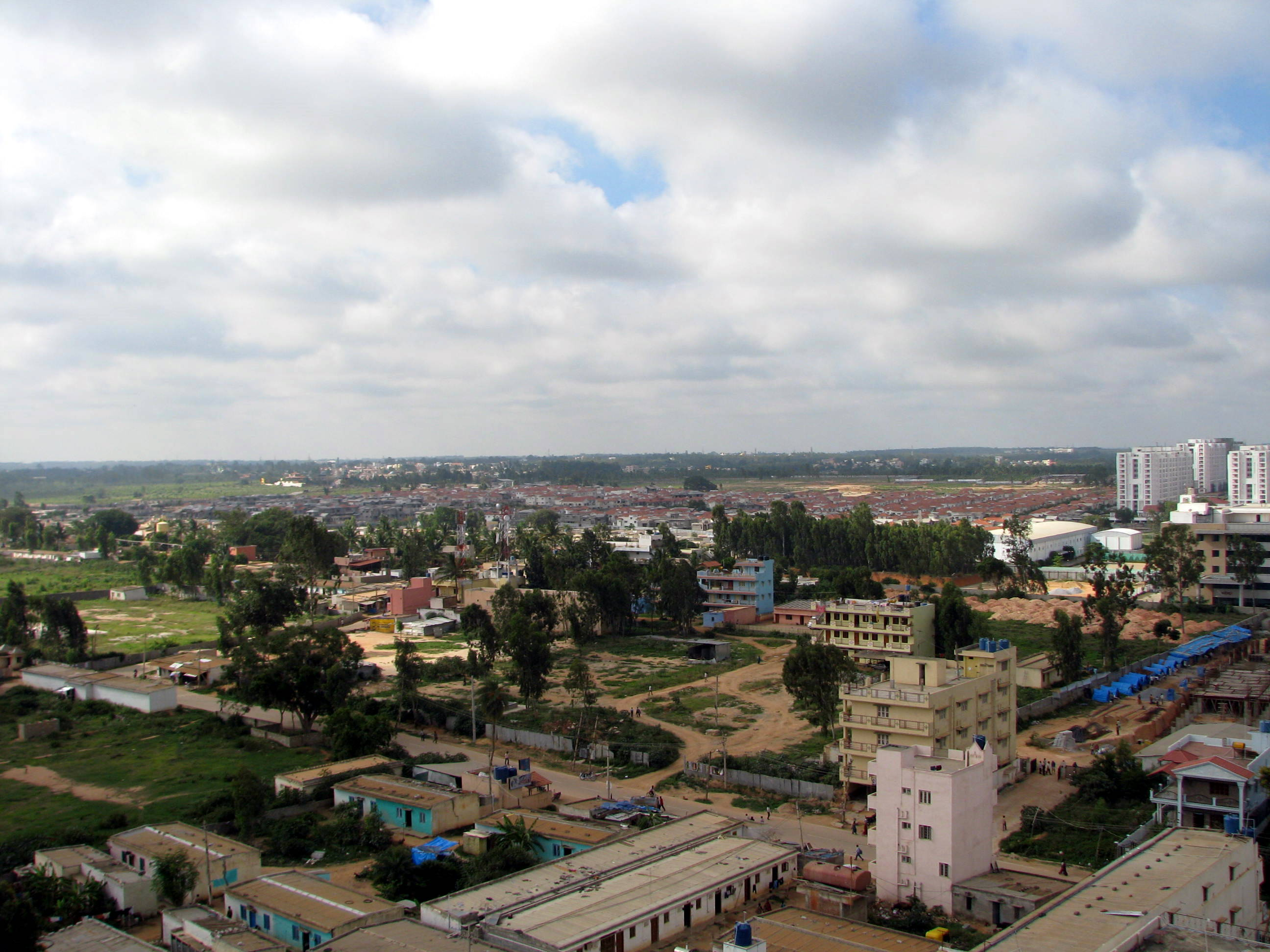
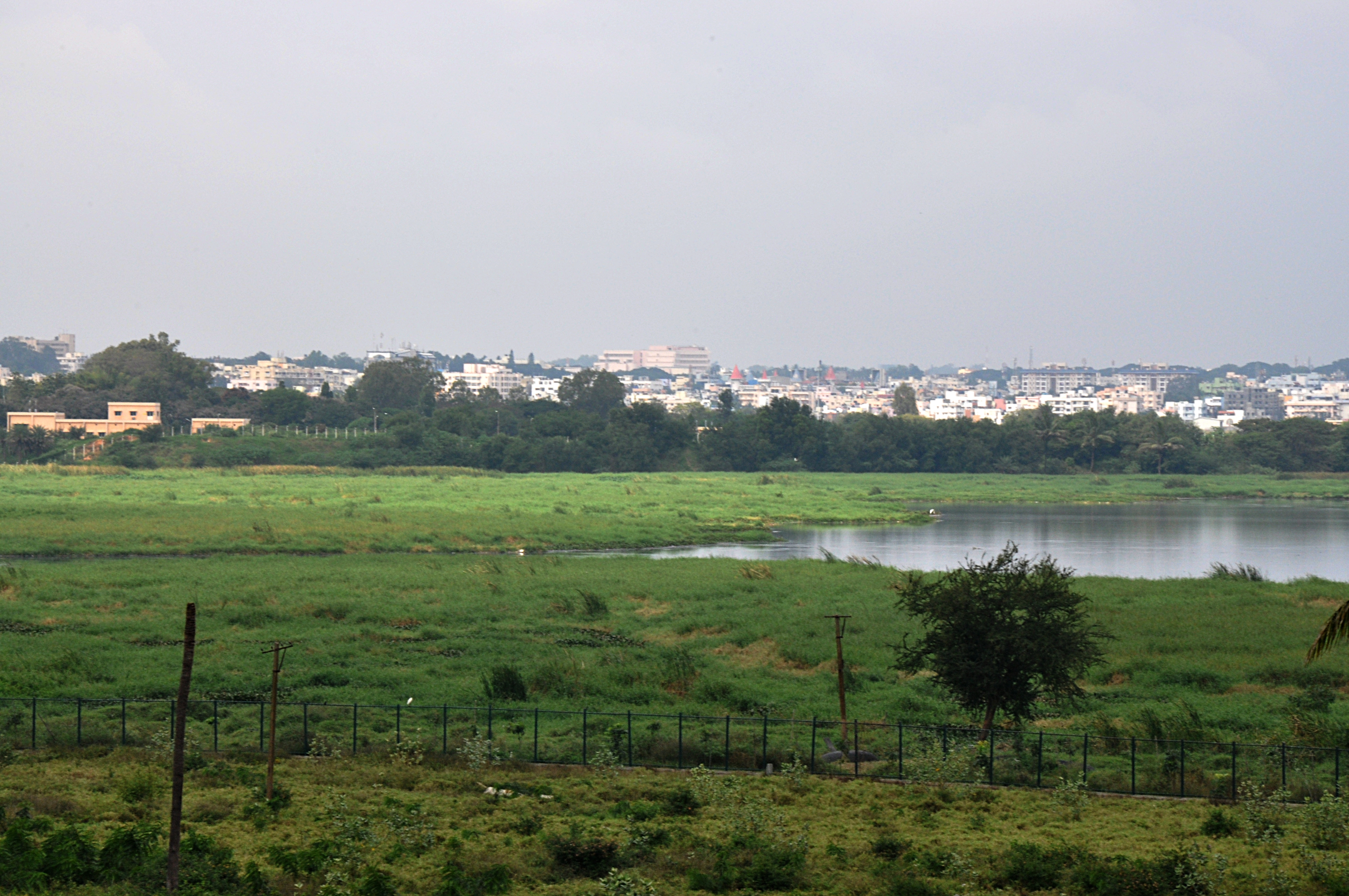
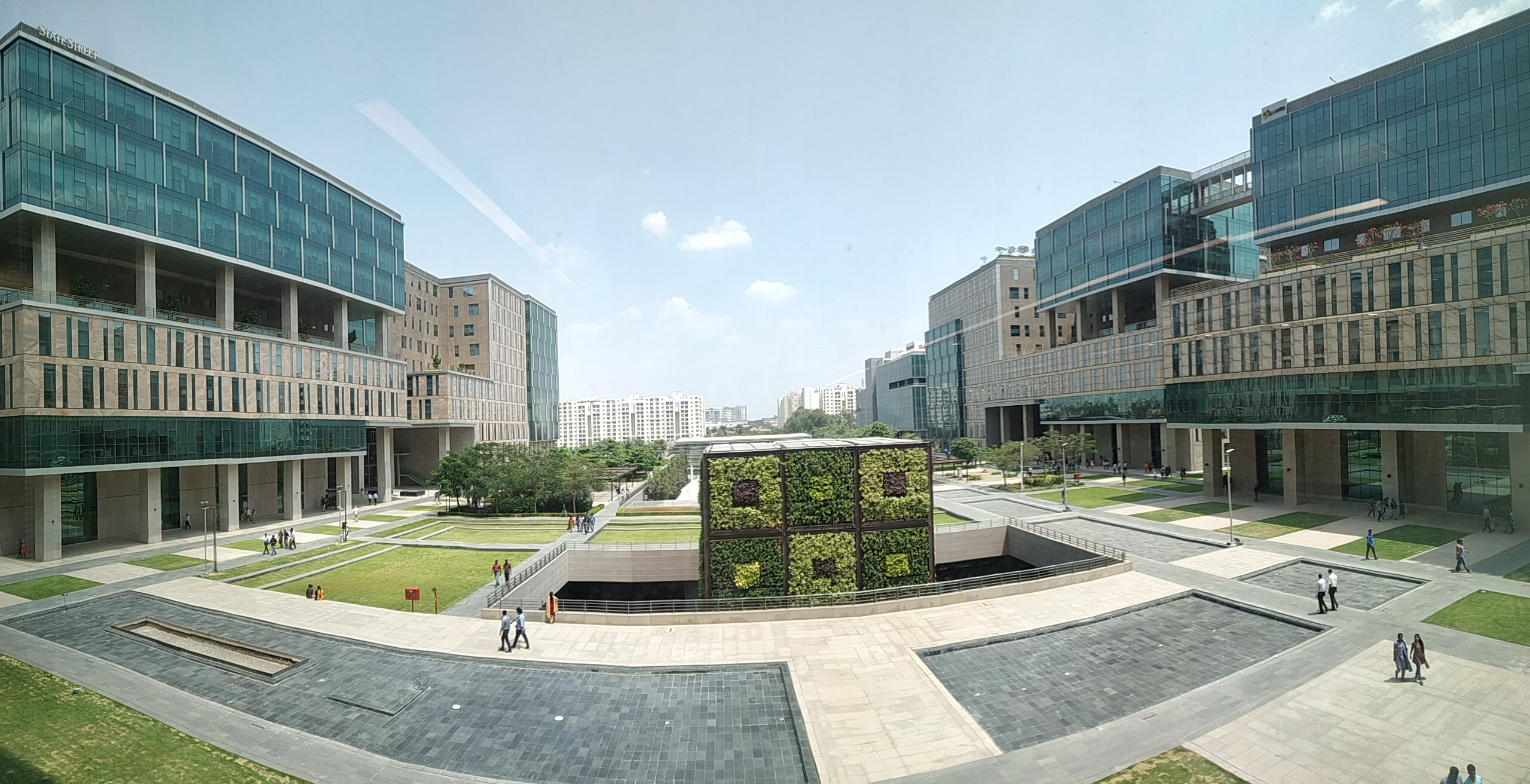
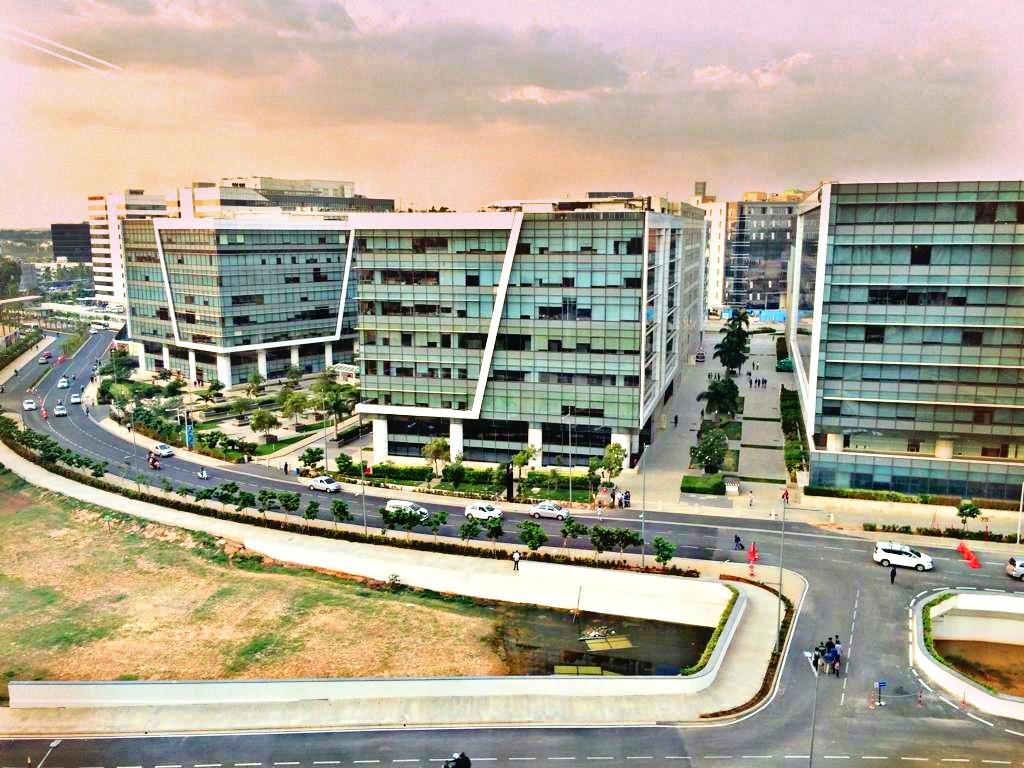
- (Clockwise from top) Intel and RMZ Ecospace skyline, Bellandur lake, Embassy TechVillage, RMZ Ecoworld, Adarsh Palm Retreat skyline in 2010

- Location within Bengaluru
- Coordinates: 12°55′34″N 77°40′33″E
- Country: India
- State: Karnataka
- District: Bangalore Urban
- City: Bangalore
- Lok Sabha constituency: Bangalore Central
- Assembly constituency: Mahadevapura

Government
  - MP: P. C. Mohan (BJP)
  - MLA: Aravind Limbavali
  - Councillor: Asha Suresh

Area
  - Total: 26.4 km^{2} (10.2 sq mi)
  - Land: 22.15 km^{2} (8.55 sq mi)
  - Water: 4.25 km^{2} (1.64 sq mi) 16.09%
  - Park area: 0.11 km^{2} (0.042 sq mi)

Population (2011 Census)
  - Total: 80,180
  - Density: 3,041/km^{2} (7,880/sq mi)
- Time zone: UTC+5:30 (IST)
- Pincode: 560 103
- Area code: 080
- Civic agency: BBMP

Bellandur is a suburb in south-east Bangalore, Karnataka, India. It is bounded by HSR Layout to the west, Devarabisanahalli to the east, Sarjapur Road to the south, and the Bellandur Lake to the north. The Bellandur Lake is the largest lake in Bangalore, and separates Bellandur from the HAL Airport. The Outer Ring Road passes through Bellandur, making the area an important transit point between east and south Bangalore.

Initially a rural area, Bellandur has recently experienced a sharp rise in population and real estate development as a result of Bangalore's information technology (IT) boom. Although most of Bellandur's housing contains modern facilities, the suburb faces challenges such as water shortage, heavy traffic, and poor drainage which has resulted in severe pollution of Bellandur Lake. The Bruhat Bengaluru Mahanagara Palike (BBMP) has constructed several borewells in Bellandur in attempt to mitigate the water shortage.

Bellandur will be soon connected to other parts of the city by a metro station of the same name, that would be a part of the Blue Line, of the city's metro network, expected to be ready by 2026.

== History ==
Bellandur is home to the Bellandur Lake that was built during the reign of the Western Ganga dynasty in the 10th century CE. Historical artifacts excavated along the bed of the Bellandur lake shows evidences of early human settlement in the region. Dolmens, standing stones, stone circles, tools and other artifacts tracing their origin to the Megalithic Period have been discovered in Bellandur. Another excavation carried out by historian D.R. Gordon in 1945 unearthed ancient Roman coins in the region.

During the reign of the Chola dynasty in the 11th century CE, Bellandur was called Vikrama Chola Mandala. Tamil inscriptions from Cholas have been found at Kammasandra near Bidarahalli. Inscriptions from the earlier Ganga Dynasty can also be found at the hero stone (veeragallu) of King Shri Purusha.

== Administration ==
Bellandur is a part of ward number 150 of the BBMP. The Bellandur ward falls under the Mahadevpura assembly constituency. The ward has a total area of 26.37 km^{2}. Per the 2011 Census, the ward had a population of 80,180, with 22,368 households. The population of the ward rose by 290.60% from 2001 to 2011. In 2021, during the second wave, the local administration came in for heavy criticism. Even though Bellandur was one of the areas, along with the neighbouring HSR Layout, consistently recording the highest incidents of COVID-19 cases, the percentage of vaccines allotted to these regions were lower than the percentage allotted to the rest of Bangalore.

As of 2015, the Bellandur ward had 43 parks, accounting for a total area of 0.105 km^{2}.

=== Localities and lakes ===
The following localities are a part of the Bellandur ward:

- Shubh Enclave
- Green Glen Layout
- Annaiah Layout
- Haraluru
- Kaikondahalli
- Gayatri Layout
- CSB Layout
- Blooming Dale layout
- KPCL Layout
- Jayaramareddy Layout
- Junnasandra
- Dodda Kannalli
- Owner's Court Layout
- Bovi Colony
- Amruth Nagar
- Eastwood Layout
- Royal Classic Layout
- Lake view layout
- Kasavanahalli
- Ambalipura
- Bhoganahalli
- Devarabeesanahalli
- Bellanduru
- Kariammana Agrahara
- Kadubeesanahalli
- Ayyappa nagar
- PB Layout
- Manjunatha Layout
- CKB Layout
- Veerappa reddy Layout
- Bora reddy Layout
- Shantiniketana Layout
- Patel Layout
- Vinayaka Layout
- KPTCL Layout
- Janatha Colony
- Doddakannali kere
- Challaghatta
- Belur Nagasandra
- BWSSB Quarters
- Ambedkar Colony (Belur Nagasandra)
- Kempapura and
- Bellandur Tank .

Bellandur ward contains the following lakes. The lakes once had wetlands, which were destroyed in the "rejuvenation" process.:

- Haralur
- Junnasandra
- Kasavanahalli
- Doddakannelli
- Kaikondranahalli
- Ambalipura Melena Kere
- Ambalipura Kelagena Kere
- Soul Kere
- Bhoganahalli
- Devarabeesaranahalli
- Bellandur

== Realty ==
Bellandur has affordable real estate prices compared to the rest of the city. In 2022, the average cost of an apartment in Bellandur was ₹6,718 (US$70) per square foot. Generally, land located closer to the Outer Ring Road is most expensive, with prices reducing as distance from the Ring Road increases. This was an increase from the ₹5,500 (US$57) per square foot in 2015.

Bellandur is a popular residential location for employees of Bangalore's information technology (IT) and finance industry due to the presence of several special economic zones in the area. The offices of KPMG, SAP Labs, AT&T, Cisco, Intel, Wipro, Microsoft and other major IT and finance firms are located in the suburb. Whitefield and Electronic City, two other IT hubs in Bangalore, are located about 12–15 km and 15–18 km away from Bellandur. Real estate developer Sobha estimated that 80% of apartments in Bellandur are purchased by IT employees.

== Schools ==
- Smrti Academy - CBSE
- St. Peters - ICSE
- Orchids
- Vibgyor - IGCSE
- Divine Providence School - CBSE
- Narayana E-Techno School, Bellandur - Integrated CBSE
- Neev Academy - IB/ICSE
- Anand Shiksha Kendra - CBSE
