= Karuna Trust (India) =

Coordinates: 12.92099°N 77.58804°E

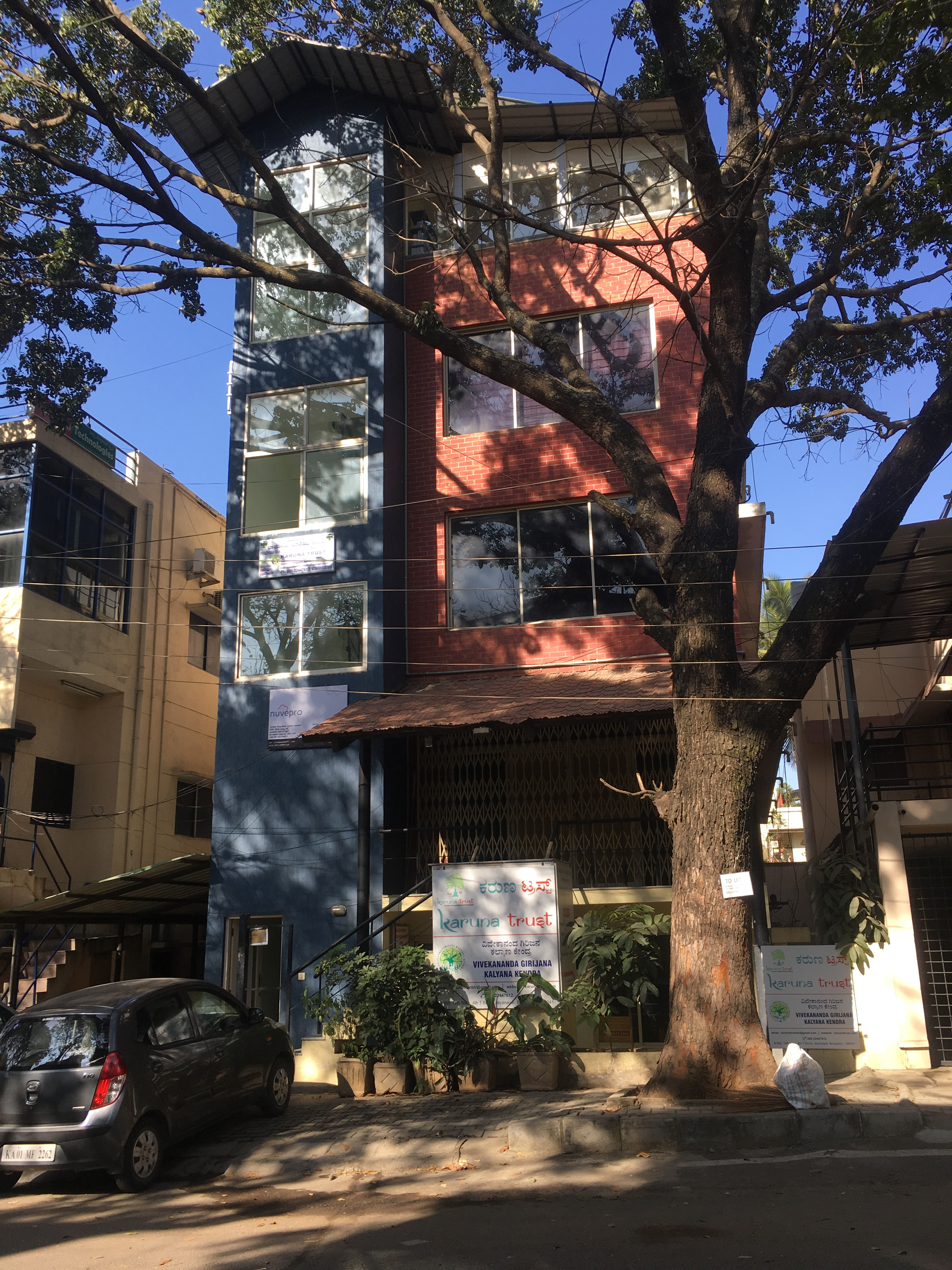
Karuna Trust main office in Bengaluru

Karuna Trust (India) is an organization involved with integrated rural development and is affiliated to Vivekananda Girijana Kalyana Kendra. Both charities were founded by Hanumappa Sudarshan. The motivation to start this trust was the prevalence of leprosy in Yelandur Taluk of Chamarajanagar district. Another focus area for this trust is education and livelihood improvement.

Karuna Trust runs 25 Primary Health Care (PHC) Centres in all the districts of the state of Karnataka and 9 PHCs in Arunachal Pradesh. The organization promotes Public Private Partnership with NGOs on a non-profit basis to achieve primary health care. They also pioneered a public health insurance for low-income Indians.
