= Lake Development Authority =

Former government agency in Bangalore

Government agency overview
- Formed: 10 July 2002
- Dissolved: 2015
- Superseding agencies: Karnataka Lake Conservation and Development Authority (KLCDA); Karnataka Tank Conservation and Development Authority (KTCDA)
- Key document: KLCDA Act 2014
- Website: Archived site of KLCDA

The Lake Development Authority (LDA) in Bangalore, Karnataka, and its successor the Karnataka Lake Conservation and Development Authority (KCLDA) were formed in 2002 and 2015 respectively. Karnataka Tank Conservation and Development Authority (KTCDA) under the Minor Irrigation Department became the superseding agency.

== Background ==
Lake Development Authority was created by Government order on 10 July 2002 as a registered society for the monitoring, regeneration and conservation of lakes in and around Bangalore city, later extended in 2003 to all lakes within Karnataka municipal corporations. Rendered ineffective and largely inactive due to a lack of statutory authority, staffing, branch offices and funding the LDA claimed it could only feasibly play a role in mediate between citizens and the custodians of the lakes.

To address these deficiencies, the Government passed the Karnataka Lake Conservation and Development Authority Act 2014 creating a superseding agency for the purpose of protecting, conserving, reclaiming, restoring, regenerating and integrating the development of lakes, whether natural or man-made in the state of Karnataka. The KCLDA was reported to have successfully prevented encroachments onto urban lakes during its short period of operation.

In 2016, the KLCDA 2014 Act was repealed, and regulatory jurisdiction over the state's lakes handed over to the Minor Irrigation Department. Activists claim the act was repealed to appease special interests.

== Lake privatisation ==
The Karnataka government set up the Lake Development Authority (LDA) in July 2002, with an initial mandate of regeneration and conservation of lakes within BMRDA jurisdiction. While LDA's scope was large, it was reduced to giving clearance to lake related projects. It was considered ineffective in dealing with encroachments. In coordination with LDA, several organisations and funding agencies were involved such as an Indo–Norwegian collaboration, and the National Lake Conservation Programme (NLCP) under the central government. The LDA, under its public-private participation policy, began to lease out lakes for 15 years to private bodies. In 2005 and 2006, it leased out four lakes, Hebbal, Nagavara, Venkanayakere and Agara. The LDA contended that the organisation was not adequately staffed and that they did not have the finances for maintaining lakes on an ongoing basis; hence, the alternative was leasing out lakes to private parties. Under another scheme, private companies located near lakes were offered to adopt the lakes, only five lakes were adopted.

These private sector activities resulted in protests from citizen groups. Issues raised and social damage caused due to this privatization covered a wide range of factors. This included jurisdiction limitations where lakes were not addressed as a continuum with land nor with respect to inter-lake linkages. The scope of non-compliance was increased including due to lack of coordination with other related authorities. With respect to the private developer contending that the lake would be a unique recreational place, others felt that the entry fee per person would cause socio-economic exclusion of the traditional users such as farmers, fishing communities, cattle herders and washer–men. Environmentalists mentioned adverse affects on the lake's wetland ecology including lakes being reduced to pretty hygienic bowls. In 2008 public interest litigations, including one by Environmental Support Group, seeking redress were filed. In 2012 the High Court sought an end to privatisation of lakes. However it made a number of observation including "private participation in such projects is in accordance with national water policy". The final order contained a report titled "Preservation of Lakes in the City of Bangalore" (2011).

This eventually resulted in the Karnataka legislature introducing an act resulting in the formation of the Karnataka Lake Conservation and Development Authority (KLCDA), LDA was merged into this. KLCDA was done away with in 2018. Responsibilities of the KLDCA was transferred to the Karnataka Tank Conservation and Development Authority (KTCDA).
