= MV Agusta 150 Sport RS =

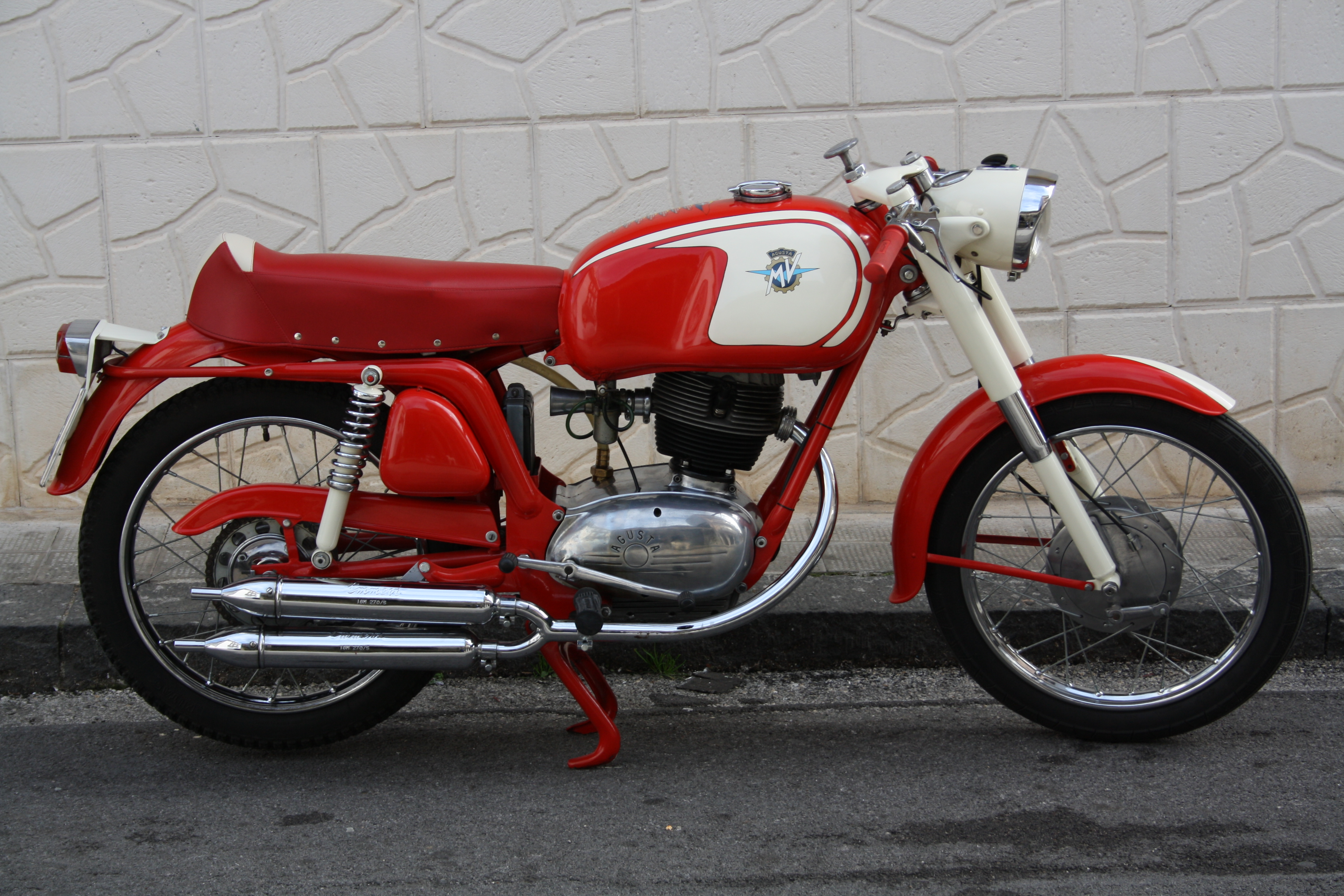
- MV Agusta 150 Sport RS
- Manufacturer: MV Agusta
- Also called: MV Agusta 150 Rapido Sport
- Production: 1959-1969
- Class: Sport
- Engine: 150 cc (9 cu in) four-stroke OHV single-cylinder
- Bore / stroke: 59.5 mm × 54 mm (2.34 in × 2.13 in)
- Compression ratio: 8:1
- Top speed: 115 km/h (71 mph)
- Power: 10 bhp (7.5 kW) @ 6,400 rpm
- Ignition type: Flywheel magneto
- Transmission: Wet, multi-plate clutch, unit construction 4-speed gearbox (5-speed from 1966), chain drive
- Frame type: Double cradle tubular and pressed steel
- Suspension: Front: telescopic forks Rear: swinging arm with hydraulic dampers
- Brakes: Front: 150 mm drum brake Rear: 125 mm drum brake
- Tires: 2.75 x 18 front & rear
- Wheelbase: 1280 mm
- Weight: 110 kg (dry)

The MV Agusta 150 Sport RS (Rapido Sport) was a motorcycle produced by the Italian motorcycle MV Agusta in their Cascina Costa plant from 1959 to 1969.

== Overview ==
The Codice della Strada (Italian Highway Code) was amended in 1959 to prohibit motorcycles of under 150 cc from using the autostradas (motorways). MV Agusta responded by producing a 150.1 cc machine based on the 125 Centomila.

Initially sold for 230,000 lire, the RS was in the market for 10 years selling 6515 units. The Centomila (one hundred thousand) engine was reputed to last for 100,000 km, thanks to a modified lubrication system, including a larger capacity sump and centrifugal filtering system.

Finished in the classic colours of Rosso and Ivory, the machine had a double exhaust system, a low fuel tank that partially covered the cylinder head and a sporty riding position.

Over the years the model underwent a few changes. Prior to February 1963, the machines had covered rear shock absorbers and tank cap with side-opening pin, after that date, shock absorbers with open springs and a tank cap with vertical opening were fitted. In 1966 a new 5-speed gearbox was introduced and the colour scheme changed to a silver frame with red tank.

A Turismo GT version was introduced in 1960.

== Technical details ==
The engine was derived from the air cooled, single-cylinder 4-stroke 125 Centomila unit. To gain the extra displacement, the bore was increased from 54 to 59.5 mm. The 125's stroke of 54 mm was retained. The cylinder was made of cast iron and the cylinder head light alloy. Carburation was by a 20 mm Dell'Orto MB20B and power output was 10 bhp (7.5 kW) @ 6,400 rpm.

A geared primary drive took power to the wet, multi-plate clutch. The unit construction gearbox initially had 4 speeds, 5 speeds were introduced in 1966, and final drive was by chain.

For the chassis, MV's usual frame construction of steel tube and sheet metal was used. Telescopic forks were used on the front and rear suspension was by swinging arm and twin shock absorbers. Brakes were drums front and rear and spoked wheels were fitted.

== 150 Turismo GT ==
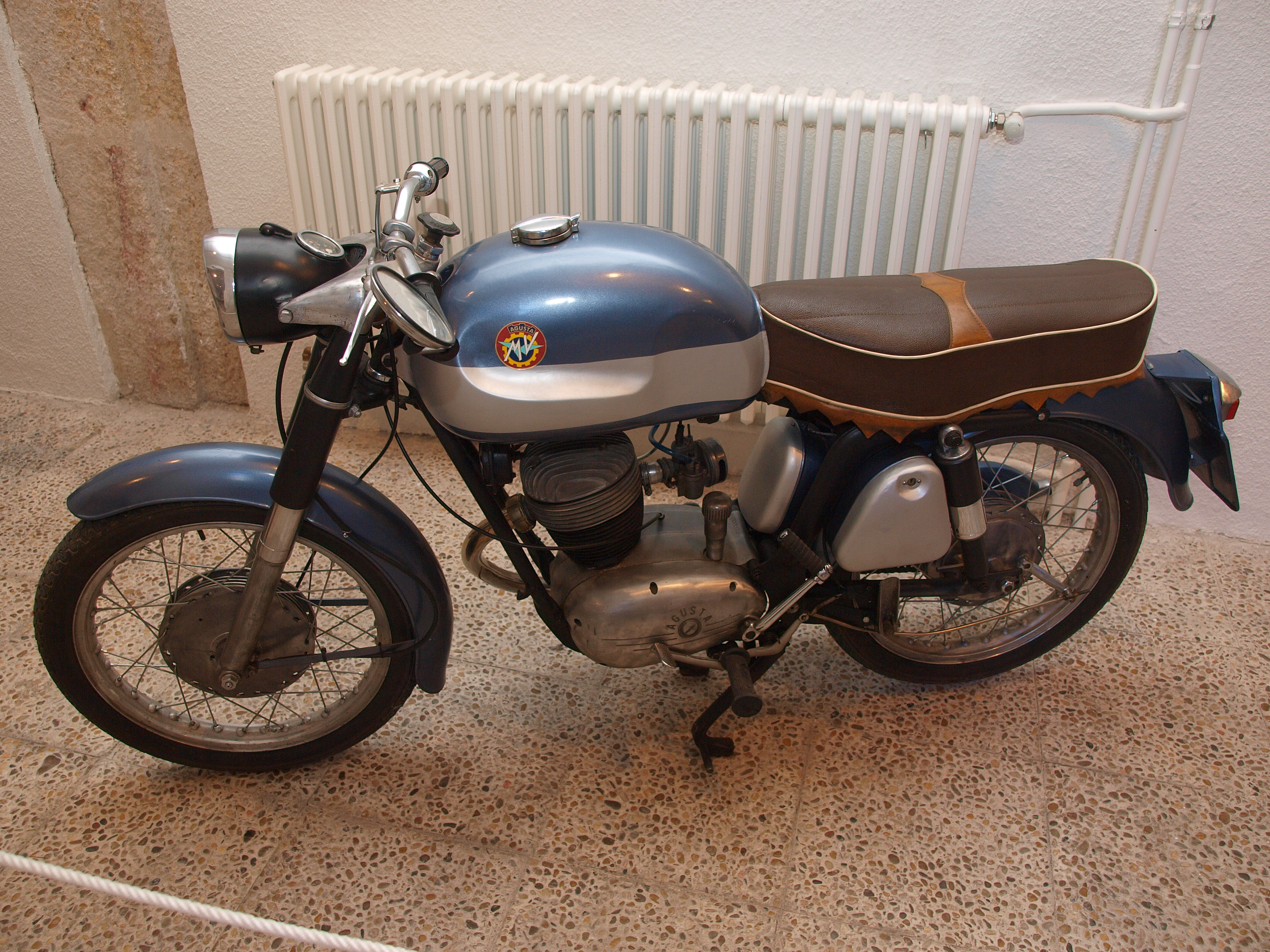
1965 MV Agusta 150 Turismo GT

A Turismo GT version was introduced in 1960. This had a single exhaust, higher handlebars and the petrol tank sat higher. The engine had a smaller 18 mm carburettor, and developed 8 bhp @ 5,700 rpm. 3,132 Turismo GTs were produced.

== 150 Sport RS-S ==
In 1960 an updated model, the 150 Sport RS-S, was introduced. The machine had a new petrol tank with indentations for the rider's knees and a single silencer. Finish was in red and black. Compression ratio was raised to 9.7: 1 and a 22 mm Dell'Orto MB22B carburettor fitted. This raised power output to 12.5 bhp. 215 examples were built until the model was discontinued in 1973.
