= Macau Grand Prix =

Annual motorsport event

Coordinates: 22°11′50″N 113°33′10″E

Chinese name
- Traditional Chinese: 澳門格蘭披治大賽車
- Simplified Chinese: 澳门格兰披治大赛车
Transcriptions
Standard Mandarin
- Hanyu Pinyin: Àomén Gélán Pīzhì dàsàichē
Yue: Cantonese
- Jyutping: ou^{3}mun^{2} gaak^{3}laan^{4} pei^{1}zi^{6} daai^{6}coi^{3}ce^{1}

Portuguese name
- Portuguese: Grande Prémio de Macau

Macau Grand Prix
- Guia Circuit

Race information
- Number of times held: 71
- First held: 1954
- Most wins (drivers): (Hong Kong) John MacDonald (4)
- Circuit length: 6.120 km (3.803 miles)
- Race length: 91.800 km (57.045 miles)
- Laps: 15

Last race (2025)

Pole position
- (United Kingdom) Freddie Slater; SJM Theodore Prema Racing

Podium
- 1. (France) Théophile Naël; KCMG Enya Pinnacle Motorsport; 15 Laps; 2. (Spain) Mari Boya; KCMG Enya Pinnacle Motorsport; +0.250; 3. (France) Enzo Deligny; R-ace GP; +1.130

Fastest lap
- Freddie Slater; SJM Theodore Prema Racing; 2:15.702

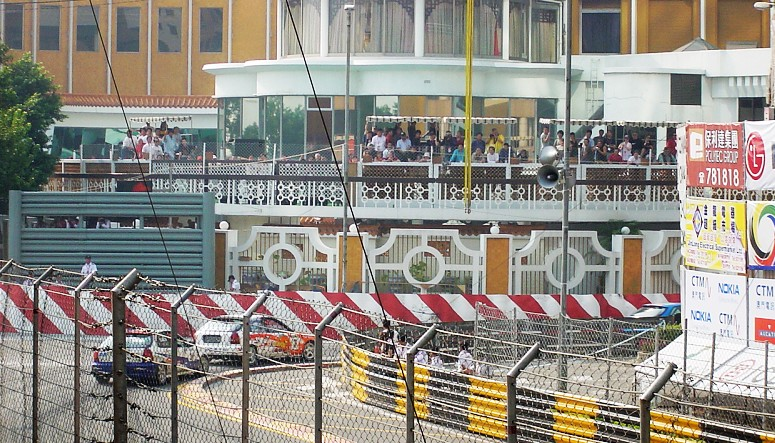
The entry into the Lisboa corner, Guia Circuit

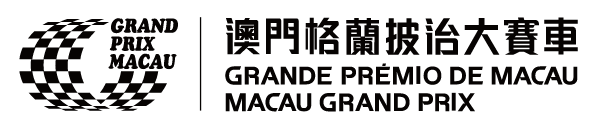
The Logo for the Macau Grand Prix

The Macau Grand Prix (Portuguese: Grande Prémio de Macau; Chinese: 澳門格蘭披治大賽車; Jyutping: ou3 mun2 gaak3 laan4 pei1 zi6 daai6 coi3 ce1) is an annual motorsport road racing event for automobiles and motorcycles held on the Guia Circuit in Macau. The event includes the Formula Regional and Motorcycle Grand Prix title races, with other races for touring, grand touring and sports cars.

The first Macau Grand Prix was held in 1954 as a sports car event. In 1967, the Macau Motorcycle Grand Prix was introduced. In 2008, a GT3 race was added to the event, which became known as the FIA GT World Cup.

The Formula 3 Macau Grand Prix featured many national Formula 3 champions and drivers from around the world, with the winner being awarded the FIA Formula 3 World Cup.

The Guia Circuit consists of fast straights (a Formula 3 car can reach a top speed of 275 km/h (171 mph) at the end of the straight), tight corners, and crash barriers. Many current or former Formula One drivers have participated in the event early in their careers, and some of them have won the prestigious prize. Previous winners include Ayrton Senna, Michael Schumacher, David Coulthard, Ralf Schumacher, Ralph Firman, Takuma Sato and Dan Ticktum.

== History ==
The Macau Grand Prix was originally conceived in 1954 as a treasure hunt around the streets of the city, but shortly after, it was suggested that the hunt's course could host a racing event for local motor enthusiasts. Production car races joined the event in 1957, which were superseded by touring cars in 1972.

In 1961, the title race became an open-wheel Formula Libre event.

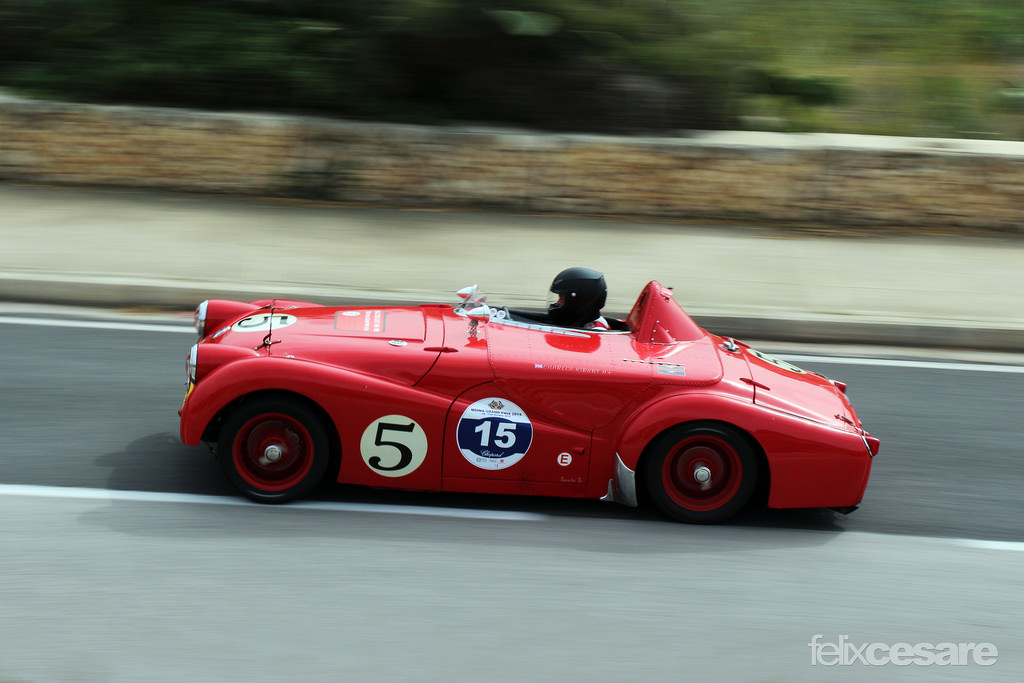
Macau Tr2 racing at Malta Grand Prix

The race continued as an amateur race until 1966, when Belgian driver Mauro Bianchi entered the race in an Alpine A220 (chassis #1722). Alpine Renault had also sent engineer Jean-Paul Castilleux to assist Bianchi with technical aspects of the car. Bianchi's victory and exposure led to more professional racing teams entering the Grand Prix in the following years.

The motorcycle race was introduced in 1967, and in that year the first fatal tragedy struck the race: double champion Dodjie Laurel was killed when he lost control of his car and crashed. This raised the alarm for more safety improvements for the race. Teddy Yip was one of the main forces behind the Macau Grand Prix back in the 1970s and 1980s, leading this Grand Prix to be one of the world's most famous motor racing events. The Macau Grand Prix parties he hosted for many years at his home also became a central part of the social aspect of the Grand Prix. Prize money at this time was not substantial, with 1980 winner Geoff Lees receiving thirty-four dollars and 1981 winner Bob Earl receiving thirty-six.

In 1983, it was decided by the organisers that since Formula Pacific was becoming obsolete, the race would be held as a Formula Three event. Initially, they wanted to run a F2 race, but as they were unwilling to make any large circuit modifications, which included cutting down trees, the organisers decided to adopt Formula 3 cars for the feature race and it was sanctioned by FIA as the F3 World Cup title race. At the same time, Yokohama Tire was officially designated as the sole supplier of control tires for the competitors.

This decision has seen the reputation of the event in the motorsport world increase rapidly, with the event attracting the best young drivers from Europe and Japan. The first F3 race was won by a young Ayrton Senna. The race in 1990 was a memorable one, as Michael Schumacher and Mika Häkkinen were involved in an incident when they were in first and second going into the final lap. At the main straight just after the Mandarin Oriental Bend, Häkkinen hit the back of Schumacher's car and crashed out when he attempted to overtake him. Schumacher's car was able to continue with its rear wing damaged and eventually won the race with the best aggregate time. Other notable winners include Formula One drivers David Coulthard, Ralf Schumacher and Takuma Sato. Since the introduction of F3 races, the Macau GP has gradually become a stepping stone for many F3 drivers to higher class motor-racing competitions such as the FIA Formula 2 Championship and Formula One. Amongst the drivers in the field in the 2010s, seven of them who have started this race would go on to win a Formula One race – Valtteri Bottas in 2011, Carlos Sainz Jr. in 2013, Max Verstappen and Esteban Ocon in 2014, Charles Leclerc in 2015, George Russell in 2016, and Lando Norris in 2017, but the 1995 Macau Grand Prix is the most recent race won by a driver who went on to win a Formula One race.

The event received world championship status from 2005 to 2014 as the final round of the World Touring Car Championship.

== Format ==
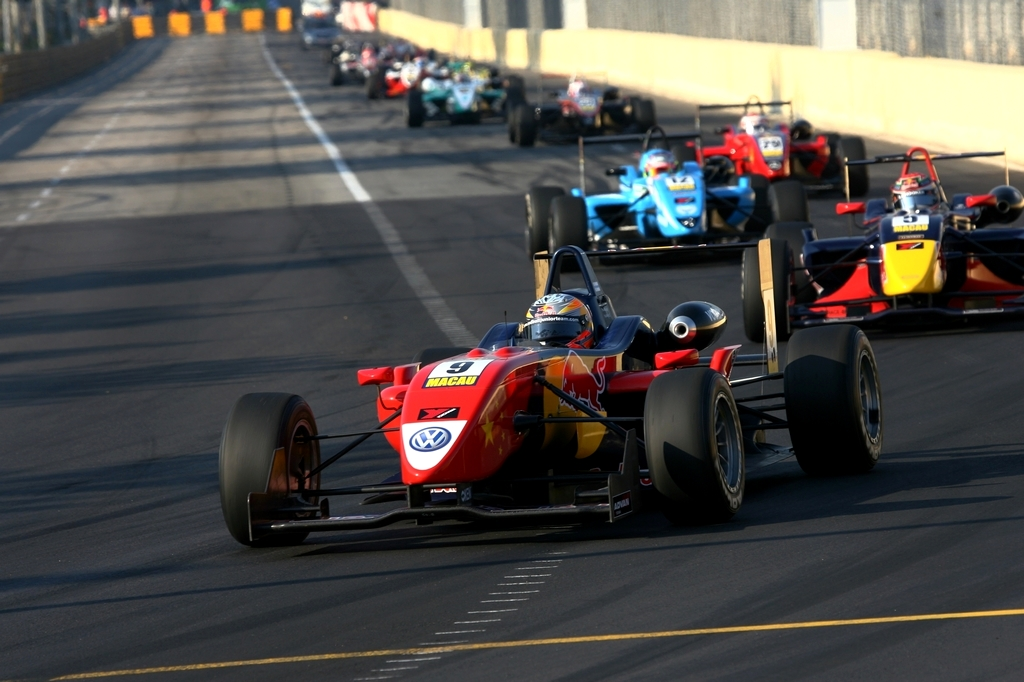
The 2008 Macau Grand Prix in progress

The Macau Grand Prix race weekend normally starts on the Thursday and ends on the Sunday on the second or third week of November. The first two days (Thursday and Friday) are generally scheduled for practice and qualifying. All races are held on Saturday and Sunday, with the final rounds of the heavyweights Macau Formula 3 Grand Prix and the Touring Car Guia Race (the final 2 rounds of the World Touring Car Championship), as well as the FIA GT World Cup, held on the last day. Both the Macau Formula 3 Grand Prix and the Guia Race are sanctioned by the FIA and the winner of the Macau Formula 3 Grand Prix is awarded the FIA World Cup. Apart from the two major races held at the race weekend, the Macau Motorcycle Grand Prix is also one of the highlights of the weekend since it features former or current racers of the Superbike World Championship and stars of Britain's legendary open-road motorcycle races such as the Isle of Man TT.

Newly introduced into the 2007 race Macau GT Cup is the race for GT3 category cars. Since 2015 the winner of the race is awarded the FIA GT World Cup.

Over the years, the Macau Grand Prix's Guia Race for touring cars had belonged to the Asian Touring Car Championship, and the current GT Cup race was once the Supercar Cup for road going exotic sports cars., the Formula Renault race, the Porsche Carrera Cup Asia race, the scooter race for locals and in the past but on a less than frequent basis, a Jackie Chan endorsed race for celebrity women drivers (partnered with pro racers) involving Mitsubishis, with whom Chan hold a sponsorship deal.

== Races ==
=== Macau Grand Prix (1964–present) ===
The title race was first held in 1954 as a sports car race. In 1961, it switched to Formula Libre regulations until 1974, when Formula Pacific became the rule. 1983 was a start of the new era with the introduction of the Formula 3, which attracted drivers from European Formula 3 championships and the Japanese Formula 3 Championship.

2019 introduced the Dallara F3 2019 machinery, with the entrants—all of them from the FIA Formula 3 Championship—using equal cars and engines for the first time.

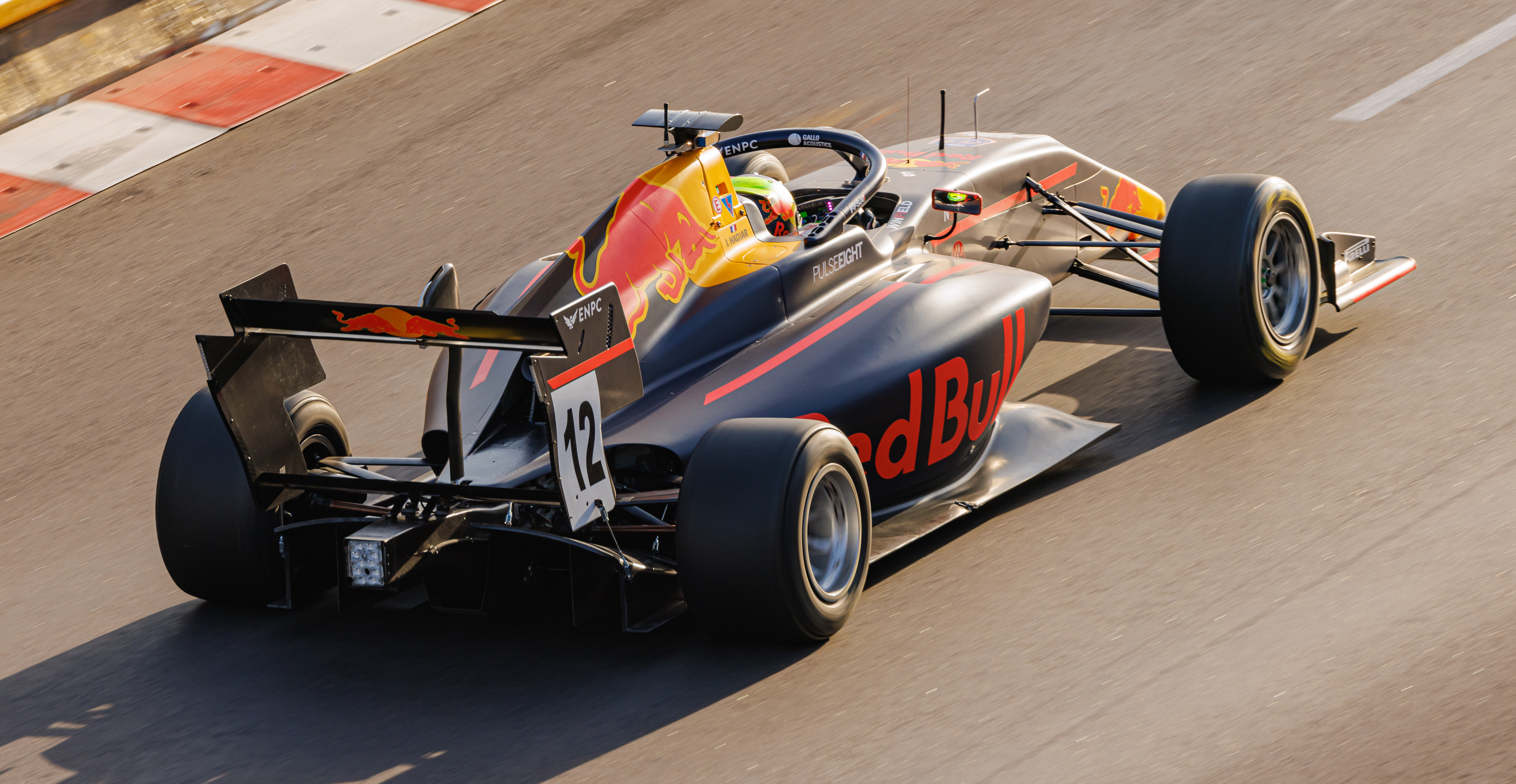
Dallara F3 2019 in the 70th Macau Grand Prix

In 2020, 2021 and 2022, the title race was run as a part of China's Formula 4 championship with exclusively local drivers and teams, as the COVID-19 pandemic forced travel restrictions on international FIA F3 drivers and teams.

From 2024 onwards, the race assumed Formula Regional regulations and returned to the 1983–2018 format where drivers of various European, North American, and Asian championships are eligible to participate.

International and national series to include the race, or the titles it awarded:

- 1977–1982: Formula Pacific Championship
- 2004–2010: FIA Intercontinental Formula 3 Cup
- 2011: FIA Formula 3 International Trophy & FIA Intercontinental Formula 3 Cup
- 2012–2014: FIA Intercontinental Formula 3 Cup
- 2015: FIA Formula 3 Intercontinental Cup
- 2016–2019: FIA Formula 3 World Cup
- 2020–2022: F4 Chinese Championship
- 2023: FIA Formula 3 World Cup
- 2024–present: FIA Formula Regional World Cup

=== Macau Motorcycle Grand Prix (1967–present) ===
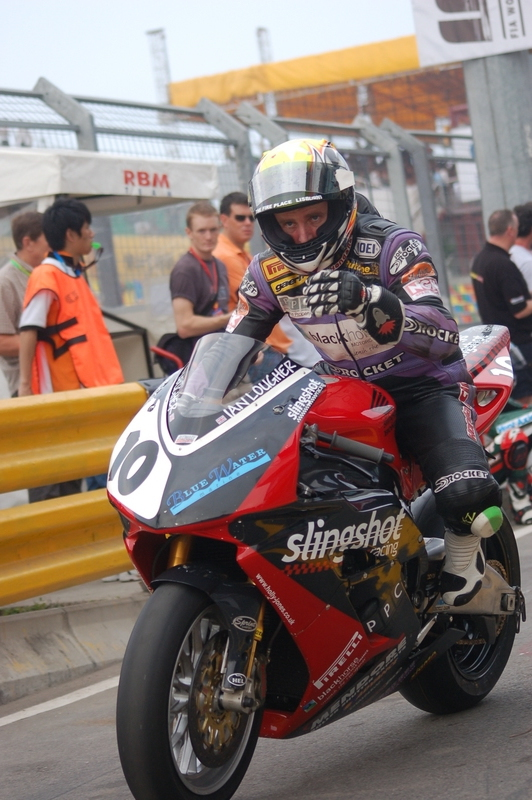
Ian Lougher at the 2006 Macau Grand Prix

Macau is a special event for motorcycle riders. The Motorcycle Grand Prix has featured notable top-level riders, with winners of the race including MotoGP World Champion Kevin Schwantz, Superbike World Champion Carl Fogarty, notable MotoGP rider Ron Haslam and Isle of Man legends Michael Rutter, Robert Dunlop, and John McGuinness. Because of the street circuit nature, the course is closer to the legendary British open-road races than a regulation MotoGP circuit.

In 2014, the award-winning documentary Macau Gladiators by German director Andreas Knuffmann appeared. The movie is about the 2013 edition of the Motorcycle Grand Prix and followed the team of Frank Heidger and riders Didier Grams and Marc Fissette.

The 2024 Motorcycle Grand Prix was cancelled following persistent heavy rains brought about by Typhoon Toraji. Results were taken from qualifying, with Davey Todd declared the winner.

Winners
Year	Motorcycle GP Winner	Bike	Tyres	Report
1967	(Japan) Hiroshi Hasegawa	Yamaha RD56		
1968	(Japan) Hiroshi Hasegawa	Yamaha 250		
1969	(Hong Kong) John MacDonald	Yamaha		
1970	(Indonesia) Benny Hidayat	Yamaha YR1		
1971	(Japan) Akiyasu Motohashi	Yamaha		
1972	(Japan) Ikujiro Takai	Yamaha TR3		
1973	(Japan) Ken Araoka	Suzuki RG500		
1974	(Japan) Hiroyuki Kawasaki	Yamaha		
1975	(Japan) Hideo Kanaya	Yamaha		
1976	(United Kingdom) Chas Mortimer	Yamaha		
1977	(United Kingdom) Mick Grant	Kawasaki KR750		
1978	(Japan) Sadao Asami	Yamaha TZ750		
1979	(Japan) Sadao Asami	Yamaha TZ750		
1980	(Japan) Sadao Asami	Yamaha TZ750		
1981	(United Kingdom) Ron Haslam	Honda RS1123		
1982	(United Kingdom) Ron Haslam	Honda RS1123		
1983	(United Kingdom) Ron Haslam	Honda NS500		
1984	(United Kingdom) Mick Grant	Suzuki RGB500		
1985	(United Kingdom) Ron Haslam	Honda RS500	Dunlop	
1986	(United Kingdom) Ron Haslam	Elf-Honda 3	Dunlop	
1987	(United Kingdom) Ron Haslam	ROC Elf-Honda 4	Michelin	
1988	(United States) Kevin Schwantz	Suzuki RGV500	Michelin	
1989	(United Kingdom) Robert Dunlop	Honda RC30		
1990	(United Kingdom) Steve Hislop	Honda RC30		
1991	(Belgium) Didier de Radiguès	Suzuki RGV500	Dunlop	
1992	(United Kingdom) Carl Fogarty	Harris Yamaha 500	Dunlop	
1993	(United Kingdom) Steve Hislop	ROC Yamaha 500		
1994	(United Kingdom) Steve Hislop	Harris Yamaha 500		
1995	(United Kingdom) Mike Edwards	ROC Yamaha 500	Michelin	
1996	(United Kingdom) Phillip McCallen	Yamaha YZR500	Michelin	
1997	(Switzerland) Andreas Hofmann	Kawasaki Ninja ZX-7R	Michelin	
1998	(United Kingdom) Michael Rutter	Honda RVF750 RC45		
1999	(United Kingdom) David Jefferies	Yamaha YZF-R1		
2000	(United Kingdom) Michael Rutter	Yamaha YZF-R1	Dunlop	
2001	(United Kingdom) John McGuinness	Honda CBR954RR	Dunlop	
2002	(United Kingdom) Michael Rutter	Ducati 998	Dunlop	
2003	(United Kingdom) Michael Rutter	Ducati 998	Dunlop	
2004	(United Kingdom) Michael Rutter	Honda CBR1000RR	Michelin	
2005	(United Kingdom) Michael Rutter	Honda CBR1000RR	Michelin	
2006	(United Kingdom) Steve Plater	Yamaha YZF-R1	Dunlop	
2007	(United Kingdom) Steve Plater	Yamaha YZF-R1	Dunlop	
2008	(United Kingdom) Stuart Easton	Honda CBR1000RR	Pirelli	
2009	(United Kingdom) Stuart Easton	Honda CBR1000RR	Pirelli	
2010	(United Kingdom) Stuart Easton	Kawasaki Ninja ZX-10R	Pirelli	
2011	(United Kingdom) Michael Rutter	Ducati 1098	Pirelli	
2012	(United Kingdom) Michael Rutter	Honda CBR1000RR	Pirelli	
2013	(United Kingdom) Ian Hutchinson	Yamaha YZF-R1	Dunlop	
2014	(United Kingdom) Stuart Easton	Kawasaki ZX-10R	Metzeler	
2015	(United Kingdom) Peter Hickman	BMW S1000RR	Dunlop	
2016	(United Kingdom) Peter Hickman	BMW S1000RR	Metzeler	
2017	(United Kingdom) Glenn Irwin	Ducati 1199RS	Metzeler	
2018	(United Kingdom) Peter Hickman	BMW S1000RR	Dunlop	
2019	(United Kingdom) Michael Rutter	Honda RC213V-S	Metzeler	
2020 – 2021	Not held due to the COVID-19 pandemic			
2022	(Finland) Erno Kostamo	BMW S1000RR	Metzeler	
2023	(United Kingdom) Peter Hickman	BMW M1000RR	Dunlop	
2024	(United Kingdom) Davey Todd	BMW M1000RR	Metzeler	
2025	(United Kingdom) Davey Todd	BMW M1000RR	Metzeler	
2026	(United Kingdom) Peter Hickman	BMW M1000RR	Dunlop	

=== Macau Guia Race (1972–present) ===
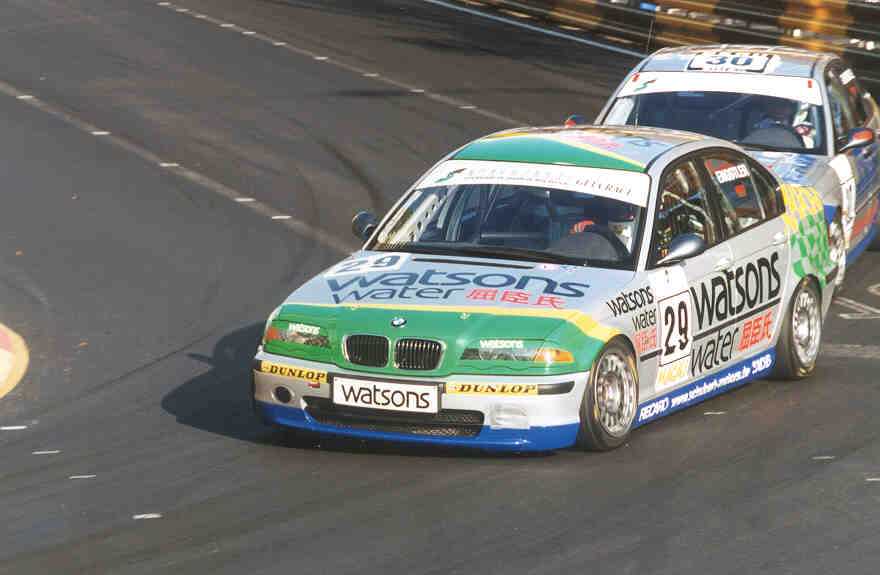
Franz Engstler in action at the 2002 Guia Race

The first Guia Race for touring cars was held in 1972. The event was notable in that very few touring car races were held on street circuits at the time. From 2005 to 2014, the race became the final two rounds of the FIA World Touring Car Championship. In 2015, the race changed formulae to the TCR Touring Car specifications. From 2015-16, the race was part of the TCR International Series. In 2017, it became the pentultimate Super 2000 formula race for the WTCC before returning back to TCR standards under the World Touring Car Cup banner in 2018, where it has been a TCR championship series race. From 2018 to 2019 it was the World Touring Car Championship

In 2020 the Guia Race was run for the TCR China Touring Car Championship with local drivers, due to the COVID-19 pandemic. From 2021 to 2022, it was run as a TCR Asia Series race, again for drivers representing Asia. Since 2023 it has been part of the Kumho TCR World Tour, which allows drivers from China and Asia series to participate, and also since 2025, TCR Australia Touring Car Series, which also allows drivers from Australia and New Zealand to participate.

Starting from 2008, the Macau Touring Car Cup was added in the calendar. In 2022 and 2023 it was the final round of the China Touring Car Championship, whilst in 2024 TCR China joined the field of the TCR World Tour for their finale. In 2025, it will be the TCR Australia Touring Car Series in addition to its World Tour status.

- Held races (including title sponsors)
  - 1972–1993: Guia Race of Macau
  - 1994: Guia Race of Macau – Asia-Pacific Touring Car Championship
  - 1995–1999: Guia Race of Macau
  - 2000: Guia Race – Asia Touring Car Series
  - 2001: STDM Guia Race
  - 2002–2003: SJM Guia Race
  - 2004: SJM Guia Race – Worldwide Touring Car
  - 2005: FIA WTCC LG – Guia Race of Macau – Presented by SJM
  - 2006: FIA WTCC – Guia Race of Macau – Presented by SJM
  - 2007: FIA WTCC – Guia Race of Macau
  - 2008: FIA WTCC Canon – Guia Race of Macau
  - 2009: FIA WTCC Marriott – Guia Race of Macau – Presented by SJM
  - 2010–2012: FIA WTCC – Guia Race of Macau Presented by SJM
  - 2013: FIA WTCC – Guia Race of Macau – Presented by Star River．Windsor Arch
  - 2014: FIA WTCC – Guia Race of Macau – Presented by Suncity Group
  - 2015–2016: Suncity Group Macau Guia Race 2.0T
  - 2017: Suncity Group Macau Guia Race – FIA WTCC
  - 2018–2019: Suncity Group Macau Guia Race – FIA WTCR
  - 2020: Macau Guia Race
  - 2021: Galaxy Entertainment Macau Guia Race
  - 2022: Wynn Macau Guia Race – TCR Asia Challenge
  - 2023: Macau Guia Race – Kumho TCR World Tour Event of Macau
  - 2024–2025: Macau Guia Race – Kumho FIA TCR World Tour Event of Macau

=== Macau Touring Car Cup (2008–2023) ===
- Held races (including title sponsors)
  - 2008–2013: CTM Macau Touring Car Race
  - 2014–2017: CTM Macau Touring Car Cup
  - 2018–2019: FOOD4U Macau Touring Car Cup
  - 2020: Macau Touring Car Cup
  - 2021: Melco Macau Touring Car Cup
  - 2022: MGM Macau Touring Car Cup – China Touring Car Championship
  - 2023: Macau Touring Car Cup – China Touring Car Championship

=== Macau GT Cup (2008–present) ===
The Macau GT Cup was added in 2008, and has been one of the most important supporting races of the Grand Prix since then.

The FIA GT World Cup is a race for GT3-spec cars, organized by the Stéphane Ratel Organisation (SRO) and the Automobile General Association Macau-China (AAMC). The event was confirmed by the FIA at the World Motor Sport Council in Geneva on 20 March 2015. The winning driver of the event is the winning driver of the Main Race, but the award for the FIA GT World Cup for Manufacturers is presented to the manufacturer supplying the cars with a manufacturer entry with the highest number of points after addition of the points of its two best cars awarded according to the result of the Main Race.

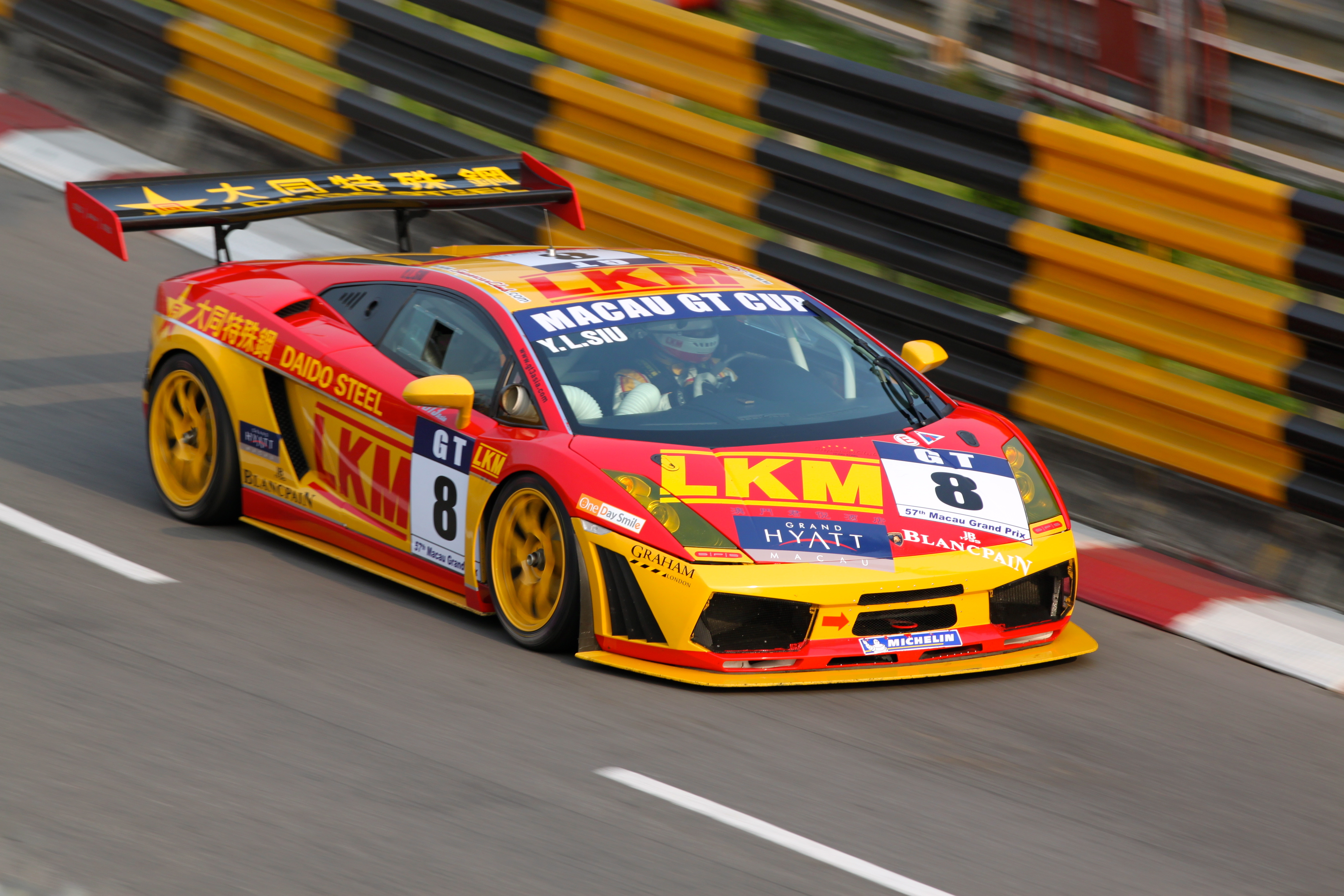
Lamborghini Gallardo GT3 in the 2010 Macau GT Cup

Starting in 2017, there is an age limit for drivers; drivers may be no older than 59 years 364 days, as bronze-level drivers are prohibited from participation. (Under FIA driver grading rules, any driver over 60 is a bronze driver, regardless of his accomplishments).

In 2020 to 2022, the Macau GT Cups locally organised (not by SRO as a part of FIA GT World Cup) due to the pandemic of COVID-19. In 2023, the race organisation returned to SRO.

- Held races (including title sponsors)
  - 2008–2010: Macau GT Cup
  - 2011: Windsor Arch Macau GT Cup
  - 2012–2013: City of Dreams Macau GT Cup
  - 2014: Macau GT Cup
  - 2015–2019: SJM Macau GT Cup – FIA GT World Cup
  - 2020: Macau GT Cup
  - 2021: Sands China Macau GT Cup
  - 2022: Galaxy Entertainment Macau GT Cup
  - 2023–2025: Macau GT Cup – FIA GT World Cup

Winners
Year	Winning driver	Winning manufacturer	Car
Macau GT Cup
2008	(Hong Kong) Darryl O'Young	(Germany) Volkswagen AG	Porsche 911 (997) GT3 Cup
2009	(Japan) Keita Sawa	(Germany) Volkswagen AG	Lamborghini Gallardo GT3
2010	(Japan) Keita Sawa	(Germany) Volkswagen AG	Lamborghini Gallardo GT3
2011	(Switzerland) Edoardo Mortara	(Germany) Volkswagen AG	Audi R8 LMS GT3
2012	(Switzerland) Edoardo Mortara	(Germany) Volkswagen AG	Audi R8 LMS GT3
2013	(Switzerland) Edoardo Mortara	(Germany) Volkswagen AG	Audi R8 LMS GT3
2014	(Germany) Maro Engel	(Germany) Daimler AG	Mercedes-Benz SLS AMG GT3
FIA GT World Cup
2015	(Germany) Maro Engel	(Germany) Daimler AG	Mercedes-Benz SLS AMG GT3
2016	(Belgium) Laurens Vanthoor	(Germany) Volkswagen AG	Audi R8 LMS GT3
2017	(Switzerland) Edoardo Mortara	(Germany) Daimler AG	Mercedes-AMG GT3
2018	(Brazil) Augusto Farfus	(Germany) BMW	BMW M6 GT3
2019	(Switzerland) Raffaele Marciello	(Germany) Daimler AG	Mercedes-AMG GT3
Macau GT Cup
2020	(China) Ye Hongli	(Germany) Daimler AG	Mercedes-AMG GT3 Evo
2021	(Hong Kong) Darryl O'Young	(Germany) Daimler AG	Mercedes-AMG GT3 Evo
2022	(Germany) Maro Engel	(Germany) Mercedes-Benz	Mercedes-AMG GT3 Evo
FIA GT World Cup
2023	(Switzerland) Raffaele Marciello	(Germany) Mercedes-Benz	Mercedes-AMG GT3 Evo
2024	(Germany) Maro Engel	(Germany) Mercedes-Benz	Mercedes-AMG GT3 Evo
2025	(Italy) Antonio Fuoco	(Italy) Ferrari	Ferrari 296 GT3
2026	(South Africa) Kelvin van der Linde	(Germany) BMW	BMW M4 GT3 Evo

=== Greater Bay Area GT Cup (2019–present) ===
In 2018 the Greater Bay Area Lotus Cup was added to the GP events. This was a single make race with all competitors driving a Lotus Exige. The race was a joint promotion between Automobile General Association Macao-China (AAMC), Hong Kong Automobile Association (HKAA) and Zhuhai Motorsports Association. The drivers were from Hong Kong, Macau and mainland China.

The Greater Bay Area GT Cup has been on the calendar since 2019, which replaced the Greater Bay Area Lotus Cup. The race includes talented GT drivers mainly from the Greater Bay Area. In 2023, it was separated as the GT3 and GT4 Cups.

- Held races (including title sponsors)
  - 2019: Suncity Group Greater Bay Area GT Cup
  - 2020: Greater Bay Area GT Cup
  - 2021: MGM Greater Bay Area GT Cup
  - 2022: Melco Greater Bay Area GT Cup
  - 2023: Greater Bay Area GT Cup (GT3 & GT4)
  - 2024-2025: Greater Bay Area GT Cup (GT4)

Winners
Year	Winning driver	Winning Team	Winning manufacturer	Car
Greater Bay Area GT Cup
2019	(Macau) Kevin Tse	(Hong Kong) Team TRC	(Germany) Mercedes-Benz	Mercedes-AMG GT4
2020	(Hong Kong) David Pun	(Hong Kong) Team TRC	(Germany) Mercedes-Benz	Mercedes-AMG GT4
2021 (R1)	(Chinese Taipei) Sean Chang	(China) Harmony Racing	(Germany) BMW	BMW M4 GT4
2021 (R2)	(Chinese Taipei) Sean Chang	(China) Harmony Racing	(Germany) BMW	BMW M4 GT4
2022 (R1)	(China) Alex Liang	(China) Harmony Racing	(Italy) Lamborghini	Lamborghini Huracán Super Trofeo EVO
2022 (R2)	(China) Alex Liang	(China) Harmony Racing	(Italy) Lamborghini	Lamborghini Huracán Super Trofeo EVO
2023 (GT3)	(Hong Kong) Darryl O'Young	(Hong Kong) Craft-Bamboo Racing	(Germany) Mercedes-Benz	Mercedes-AMG GT3 Evo
2023 (GT4)	(China) Luo Kailuo	(China) Lotus Team TORO	(United Kingdom) Lotus	Lotus Emira GT4
2024	(China) Han Lichao	Toyota Gazoo Racing China	(Japan) Toyota	Toyota GR Supra GT4 Evo
2025	(China) Daniel Lu	(China) Team Pegasus	(United Kingdom) Lotus	Lotus Emira GT4
2026	(China) Alex Liang	(Hong Kong) Craft-Bamboo Racing	(Germany) Mercedes-Benz	Mercedes-AMG GT4

=== Macau Formula 4 Race (2023, 2025–present) ===
After the COVID-19 pandemic, when Formula 4 cars were used for the main Grand Prix event, the Formula 4 race was switched to be the Macau Formula 4 Race. In 2023, the race was held as an invitational round of the Formula 4 South East Asia Championship. Starting from 2025, the race would feature the FIA F4 World Cup.

Winners
Year	Winning driver	Car
Macau Formula 4 Race
2023	(United Kingdom) Arvid Lindblad	Tatuus F4-T421
2024	Not held	
FIA F4 World Cup
2025	(France) Jules Roussel	Ligier JS F422
2026	(United Kingdom) Kenzo Craigie	Tatuus F4-T421

== Circuit ==
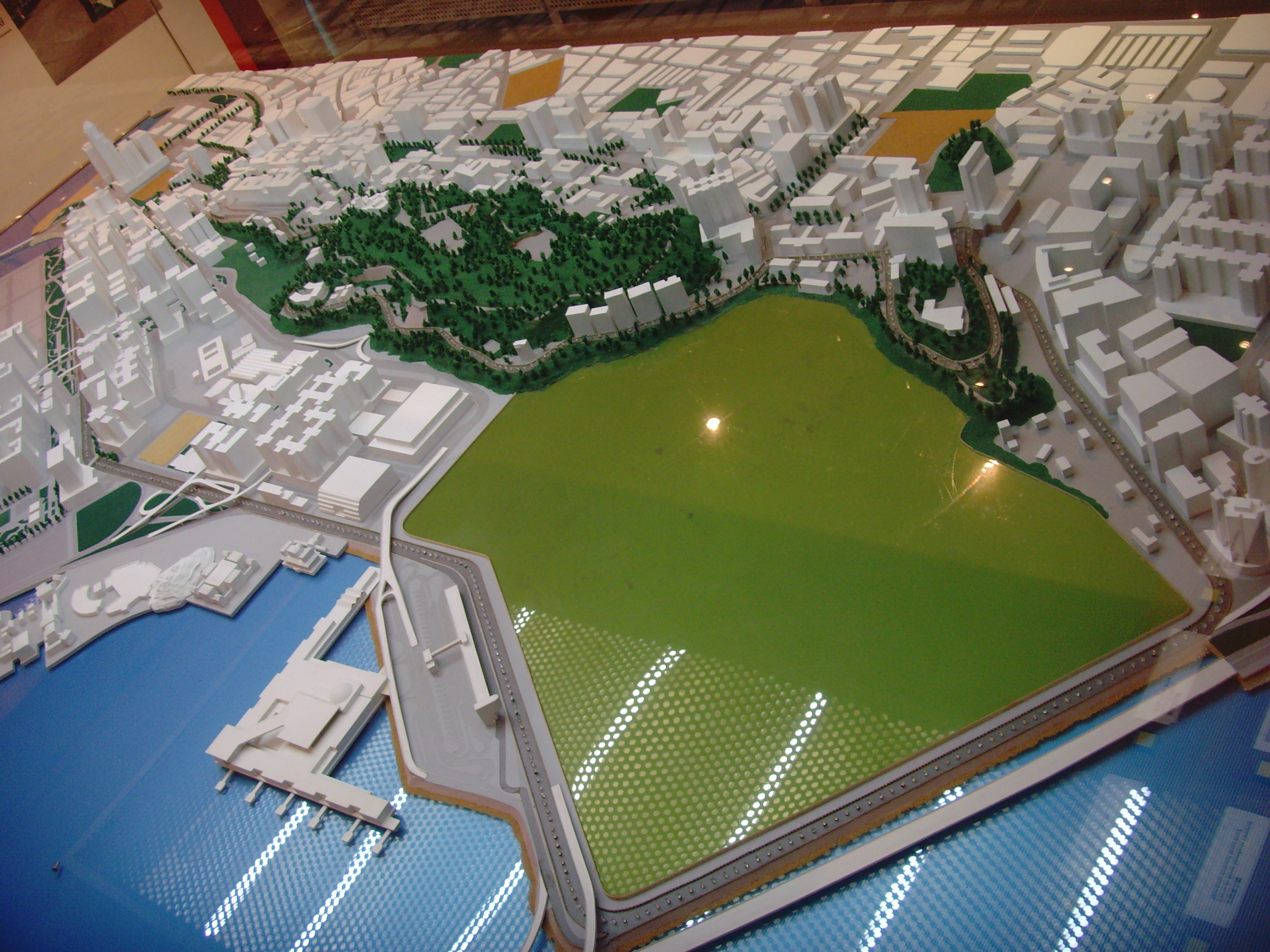
Architectural model of the Guia Circuit at the Grand Prix Museum

The 6.120 km (3.803 mi) Guia Circuit features a combination of fast straights and tight corners, with the circuit's minimum width being only seven metres. It is recognised as one of the most challenging circuits in the world. The circuit had a Grade 2 (Restricted) FIA track license in October 2023.

== Major accidents ==
As of 2026, there has been a total of 17 deaths from accidents at or related to the circuit; in total, nine motorcyclists, five car drivers, one spectator, official and bystander each. Eight of those are from Hong Kong.

1967: Dodjie Laurel: Killed when he lost control of his Lotus 41 and hit the corner sea wall, now called Mandarin Bend. He was trapped in his Formula car and burned.

1971: David Ma: whilst qualifying, he lost control of his Lotus 47 under braking for the Statue Corner, striking into a lamp post. Ma was killed instantly. The wrecked remains of his car was dumped at sea on its return trip.

1972: Chan Shui Fat: at the Guia Race, his Mini Cooper went out of control at more than 100 mph (160 km/h) and left the road. Chan jumped out of the car before it crashed into a wall and burst into flames. He died from internal bleeding shortly after being admitted to hospital.

1974: Dieter Glemser: during practice for the Guia Race, he lost control of his Zakspeed Ford Escort RS 1600 when it suffered from a blowout. The car hit a sea wall, spun across the rain-soaked track and ploughed into the mostly unprotected crowd, consisting of several young spectators. One of them, an eight-year-old child, later died of his injuries and five children between six and ten received hospital treatment. The accident led Glemser, the 1971 Guia Race winner, to retire from racing months later.

1979: Tong Zheng Hui: at the ACP saloon car support race, Tong's Toyota Corolla coupe and Bobby Chung Datsun Sunny collided with each other and caught fire at Excelsior Bend, killing Tong and hospitalizing Bobby with serious injuries. The third driver involved, Wong Weng Kwong, was critically injured after crashing into barrier at the same place immediately before collision.

1998: At the Supercar Cup (the predecessor of GT World Cup), a Ferrari 348 caught fire due to an oil leak, this almost spread to the Ferrari of Aaron Kwok, causing him to park up and bail out. The driver parked the burning car in the pits with two firefighters trying to extinguish the fire. A Porsche 911T lost control spun out of control after hitting the oil slick, striking into two firemen and three track officials, before crashing into a barrier, destroying the car frontally. The fireman later died from his injuries.

2000: Frans Verschuur: during the warm-up session for the Guia touring car race, his Renault Megane suffered a brake failure as he entered Lisboa. The car ploughed into several tyre barriers before hitting a parked car and then continued on before hitting a truck, killing a pedestrian (a tourist who was not part of the event), injuring three others and while Verschuur suffered back and leg injuries. The incident led to his team, Renault Dealer Team Holland, to pull out of the race as a mark of respect.

2012: Philip Yau: In a WTCC-spec Chevrolet Cruze in the CTM Touring Car Cup invitational, a part failure led to the car making contact with the Turn 2 (Mandarin Oriental) wall at speeds over 200 km/h. The rescue team tried to put out the fire with the fire extinguisher. The driver was airlifted to the hospital, but died shortly afterwards.

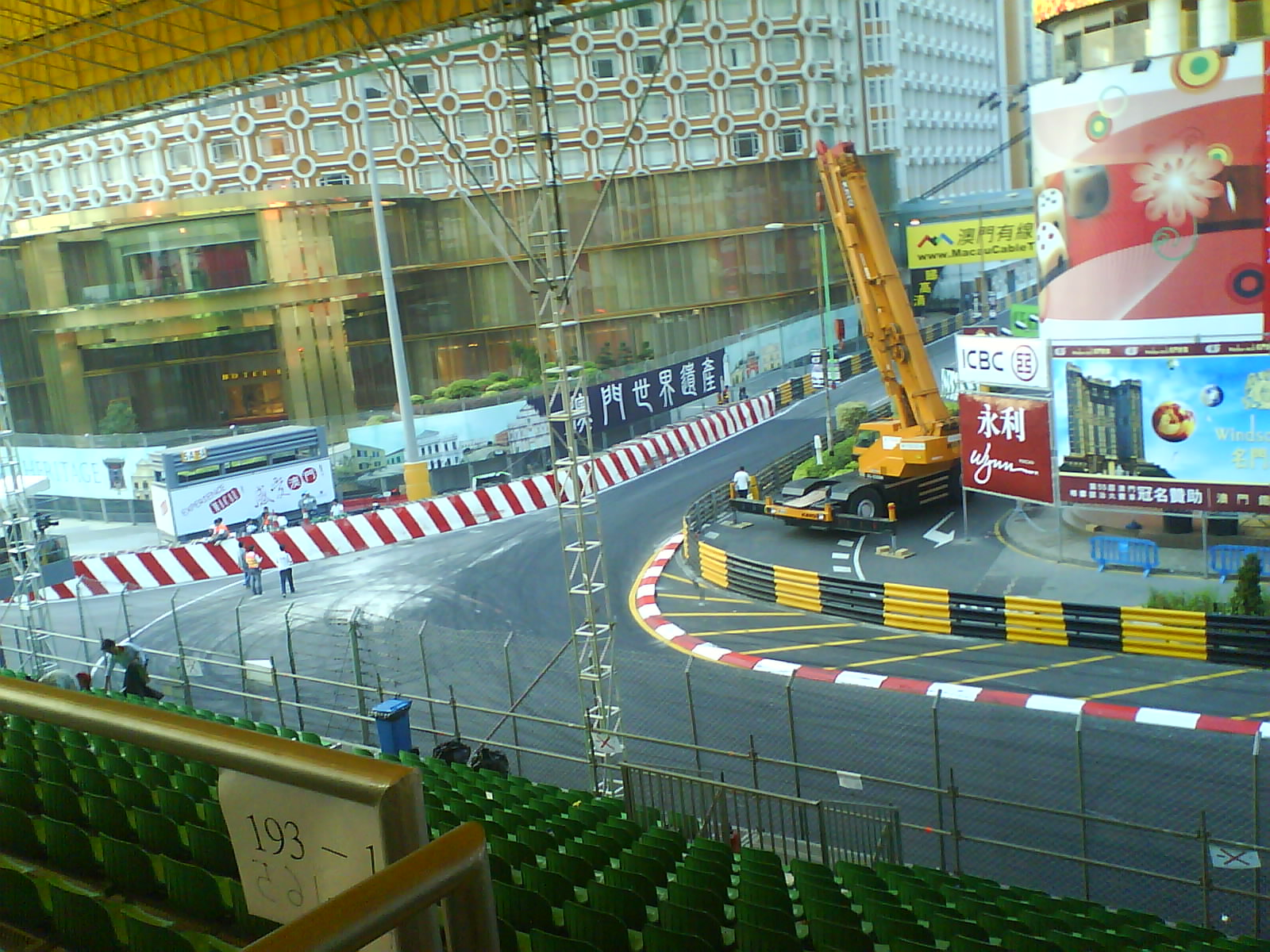
The Lisboa Corner, the site of Sophia Flörsch's accident in 2018

2018: Sophia Flörsch: Suffered a spinal fracture after her Formula 3 car became airborne after contact leading into Lisboa corner, flipping over the catch fencing and striking a photographers' bunker.

Motorcycle fatalities:

- Shea Lun Tsang 1973
- Lam Sai-Kwan 1977
- Chan Wai Chi 1983
- Zoe Maximo Rosario 1993
- Tung Sai-Wing 1993
- Katsuhiro Tottori 1994
- Bruno Bonhuil 2005
- Luis Carreira 2012
- Daniel Hegarty 2017

== Controversy ==
=== Retention ===
The society of Macau is developing rapidly. During every edition of the Grand Prix, traffic in the outer harbour area becomes severely disrupted. In 2007, politician Stanley Au Chong-kit pointed out that the Macau Grand Prix should be suspended as it wastes money and brings negative impacts to locals. Meanwhile, affairs commentator Tam Chi Keung suggested to move the Grand Prix event to Cotai. Later, in 2020, former president of the Macau SAR Sports Bureau Manuel Silverio also suggested to move the Macau Grand Prix to Cotai instead during an interview of TDM Canal. "It might be the appropriate time to use a new circuit. For instance, in Cotai, so that it can relieve a great amount of pressure for visitors and locals." This suggestion never happened as he wasn't the president of the bureau anymore.

=== Holding the event under COVID-19 pandemic in 2020 ===
Due to travel restrictions, foreign racers and riders were not able to attend the 67th edition of the Grand Prix, making the event downgraded to "Greater Bay Area only". The Motorcycle Grand Prix was cancelled, and visitors to Macau were lower than expectations. However, the Macau SAR Government persisted in holding the Grand Prix using 250 million patacas which caused dissatisfaction among local people. The Macau SAR Secretary for Social Affairs and Culture and the president of the Macau Grand Prix Organising Committee (MGPOC) Ao Ieong U refused to answer questions from local media.

The Macau SAR Sports Bureau issued a press release stating that holding the Macau Grand Prix doesn't only proves that the government is confident in pandemic prevention, and also the determination to promote post-epidemic economic recovery. Holding the Macau Grand Prix could show the demonstration of Macau's anti-epidemic results to the world, restoring tourists' confidence and intention to travel to Macau, and drive the tourism, hotel and catering industries. It also hoped to promote the recovery of the construction, transportation and automobile maintenance industries through the linkage effect of the Grand Prix, thus boosting the economy, creating jobs, increasing employment for citizens, and minimising the impact of the epidemic on society and people's livelihood. The Sports Bureau believed that holding the Macau Grand Prix is meaningful to Macau, therefore hoped the society and citizens to understand and fully support the event.

=== Switching from F3 to FR as the Grand Prix event ===
In May 2024, the FIA announced that from 2024 onwards, the Macau Grand Prix would feature Formula Regional machinery, replacing the FIA F3 World Cup. The Macau Grand Prix Organising Committee (MGPOC) issued a statement regarding the change, saying that the FR cars would be more suitable for Macau and the Macau Grand Prix would continue being the only organiser of the aforementioned FIA World Cup.

F3 racers Gabriele Minì, who finished the 2023 Macau Grand Prix in third, Laurens Van Hoepen and Nikita Bedrin expressed their unimpressed opinion on the change.

Macanese Formula 4 racer Tiago Rodrigues also expressed his thoughts on the event. He pointed out that the switch would bring both positive and negative effects. For the positive, the FR World Cup would attract more and younger racers participating in the event. On the other hand, the great tradition within motorsport and Macau is lost. "In the SAR, F3 is one of the most prestigious races in the world and brings more interest than FR. We will also probably never have a car as fast as F3 racing here anymore." said Rodrigues.

Double Formula 4 Macau Grand Prix winner Charles Leong shared the same opinion as the cost of participating in Formula Regional is less than in Formula 3, and said that the FR World Cup would not be less competitive.

Moreover, André Couto, who is the winner of the 2000 Macau Grand Prix, expected that the competitiveness and level of excitement wouldn't be affected. However, he believes that changes would be brought for the prestige of the race.

During an interview after a press conference of a sporting event in Macau, the principal of the Macau SAR Sports Bureau, Pun Weng Kun stated that the Sports Bureau disagreed on views saying that the FR World Cup would lower the influence of the Macau Grand Prix and the new competition would attract more international drivers.

In contrast, the former principal of the Macau Sports Institute, Manuel Silvério, noted that the change was obviously a demotion, not only in sporting terms, but also in terms of the city’s international projection. Silvério found the decision strange as in 2023, the FIA established a 3-year agreement with the Macau Grand Prix Organizing Committee, to continue organising the FIA F3 and GT World Cups at Macau. "In this situation, it is either a lack of communication or a lack of communication ability." he pointed out. "If this agreement exists, it must be fulfilled and the changes must be agreed by both parties. Either there was a unilateral decision by the FIA, or this change was agreed by the MGPOC." he stated.

Under changes made in the FIA Global Pathway from Karting to Formula One, the designation of "Formula 3" changed to a Formula One support event in 2019 (FIA Formula 3 Championship). "Formula Regional" denotes, as of 2019, all series that had previously been designated as Regional Formula 3, as part of an FIA-launched overhaul of all former regional Formula 3 series.

== See also ==
- Guia Circuit
- Grand Prix Museum, opened during the 40th Macau Grand Prix in 1993
- World Touring Car Championship
