= Centreless wheel =

Type of wheel without a hub

A centreless wheel or hubless wheel is a wheel that lacks a centre or hub, instead being supported and driven at the rim.

== Design ==
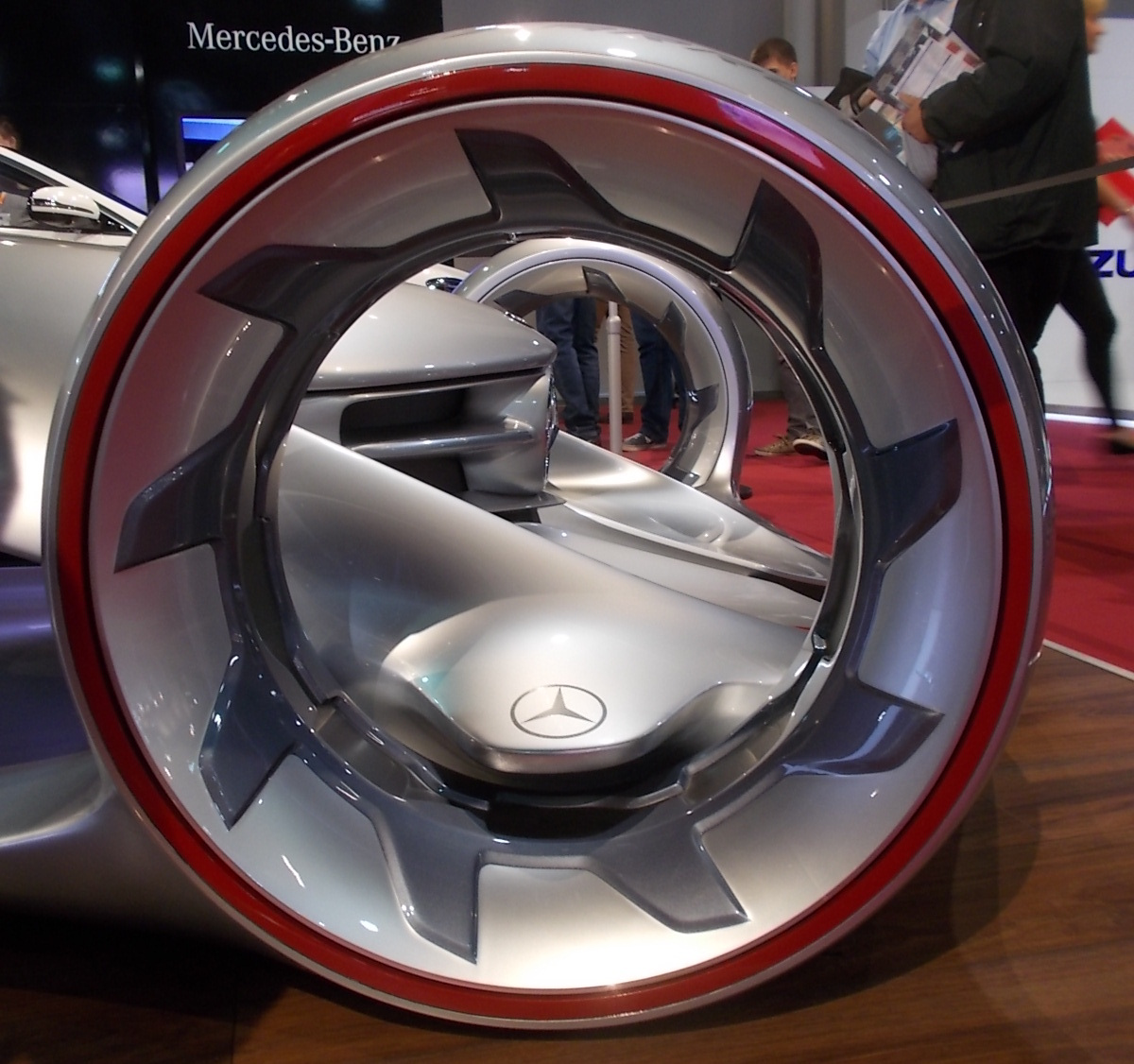
Centreless wheel on the Mercedes-Benz Silver Lightning concept car

Centreless wheels are toroidal in shape and have one or multiple bearings along the rim. Propulsion can be achieved in different ways, such as with gear teeth along the inner surface of the rim. They can be made lighter than solid and spoked wheels, resulting in better handling, and less rotational inertia. The lack of spokes or a traditional hub also allows for more space, which can be used to more easily package a hub motor.

Centerless wheels were built and patented for monowheels by at least 1869 and were proposed to replace conventional wheels by at least 1890. Prototypes for multi-wheel vehicles were built by Franco Sbarro at least by 1989, and Paul Lew had started small-volume commercial sales by 1993.

The mass production of centreless wheels has not been pursued by many large companies due to their complexity, with their use mostly limited to small companies, limited run vehicles, concept vehicles, and scientific analyses.

== Examples ==
=== Black Hole Bicycle Wheel ===
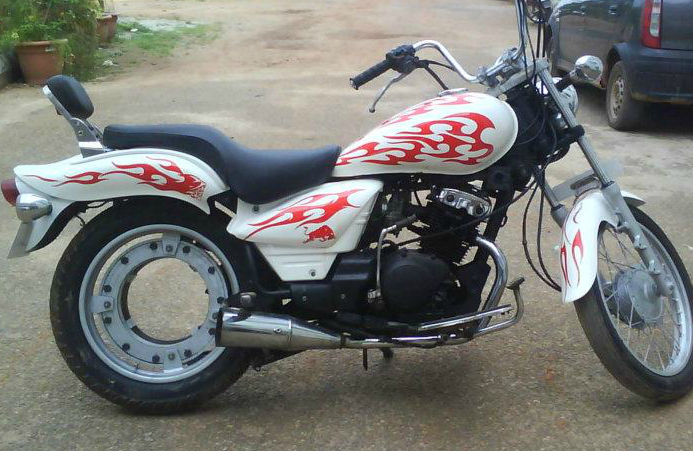
Motorcycle with a centreless rear wheel built by students in India

The Wear and Tear Black Hole front bicycle centreless wheel and fork was designed with the goals of lighter weight and better aerodynamics than conventional wheels. It supported the rim with several small rollers, which reportedly wore out quickly - acceptable for a race-oriented product, but not practical for everyday use. The Black Hole was sold starting in 1993. Production was stopped after it was banned by the Union Cycliste Internationale, as the downsides (cost, durability, etc.) meant it was not compelling for general use. One of the designers, Paul Lew, later developed improved lightweight aerodynamic wheels using hubs. Today (2025), conventional wheel+fork assemblies are lighter than the Black Hole. It is unclear how modern aerodynamic wheels compare.

=== Tron: Legacy Light Cycle replica ===
One real-life example of hubless wheels are those used in the replica Tron: Legacy Light Cycle. The street-legal motorcycle was modelled after the vehicle from the film and sold through Hammacher Schlemmer. Its hubless wheels are made from former truck tires, and a chain-driven friction drum provides power and brake force.

Designed "for casual cruising and slow ride-bys at shows", it consists of a 996 cc (60.8 cu in) fuel-injected Suzuki 4-stroke engine in a steel frame covered by a fiberglass body with electroluminescent wire lighting.

=== Skatecycle ===
The Skatecycle is a device similar to a caster board, but with hubless wheels and a 2-axis twisting axle replacing the function of the casters. The central axle connects two standing platforms surrounded by 9" polyurethane hubless wheels, giving said wheels the appearance of stirrups. In order to move the unit, the rider rotates their feet inwards and outwards, creating a wave-like motion in the hinged frame and providing propulsion. In recognition of its novel design, the Skatecycle received the Bronze International Design Excellence Award in the transportation category in 2010.

=== Zero Bike ===
Another example of a vehicle with centreless wheels is the Zero Bike, a lightweight hubless bicycle whose non-functional prototype won an Industrial Design Excellence Award in 1991. Designed by then-ArtCenter College of Design students Makota Makita and Hiroshi Tsuzaki, it is based on the principle of magnetic superconductivity, also used in high-speed maglev trains.

=== Ujet One ===
The Ujet One electric scooter, produced in Luxembourg since 2019, features front and rear centreless wheels connected to its frame with torsion-sprung suspension, as well as an electric hub motor. Such a setup is communicated to benefit from minimal energy loss in transmission. In 2019, the One won both the iF Gold and Red Dot awards for its design.

=== Freedom Sprints motorcycle ===
A working prototype of a centreless wheel, using ball bearings, was shown at India Bike Week 2014 in Goa. Attached to a customized Royal Enfield motorcycle, the prototype rear wheel was designed by a team by the name of Freedom Sprints, which included Abhishek Sharma, Ankur Tiwari, Sarvesh Khemka, Yashodeep Yadav, and Mohammed Ansar. During testing, the bike was ridden from Ajmer to Jaipur.

== See also ==
- Hub-center steering
- Motorcycle wheel
