= Yamaha RD350 =

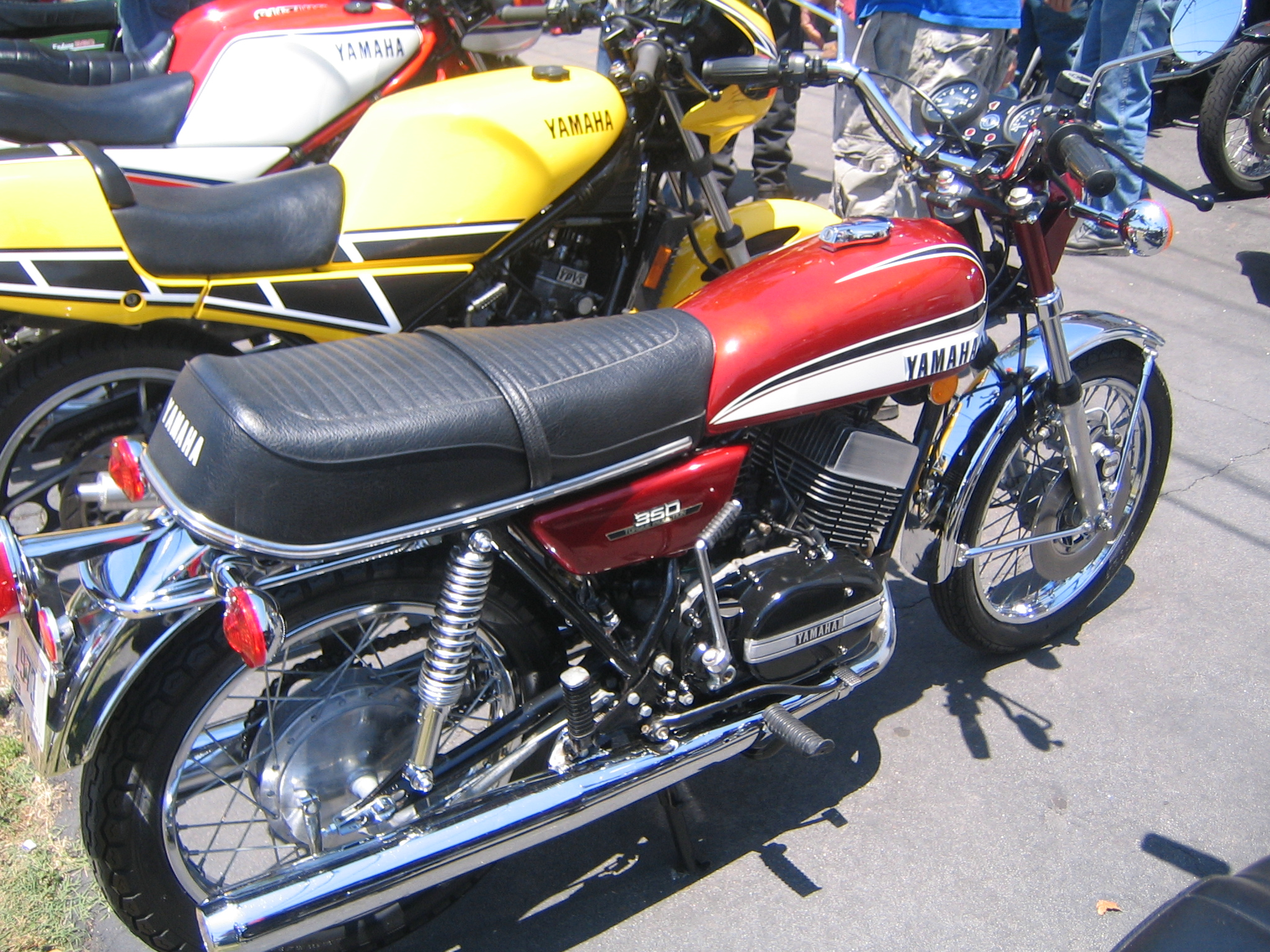
- Manufacturer: Yamaha Corporation
- Production: 1973–1975
- Predecessor: Yamaha R5
- Successor: Yamaha RD400
- Class: Sport bike
- Engine: 347 cc (21.2 cu in) air-cooled, two-stroke parallel twin
- Bore / stroke: 64 mm × 54 mm (2.5 in × 2.1 in)
- Compression ratio: 6.6:1
- Top speed: 105 mph (169 km/h)
- Power: 39 bhp (29 kW) @ 7,500 rpm
- Ignition type: dual coils, breaker points
- Transmission: 6-speed manual
- Frame type: Tubular twin cradle
- Suspension: Telescopic forks; dual shock absorber rear
- Brakes: Front: disc (Indian RD350: drum); Rear: drum
- Tires: Front: 3.00x18-4PR; Rear: 3.50x18-4PR
- Rake, trail: 27.5 degrees, 104 mm (4.1 in)
- Wheelbase: 1.320 m (4 ft 4.0 in)
- Dimensions: L: 2.04 m (6 ft 8 in); W: 0.835 m (2 ft 8.9 in); H: 1.11 m (3 ft 8 in)
- Seat height: 800 mm (31 in)
- Weight: 155 kg (342 lb) (wet)
- Fuel capacity: 15.5 L (3.4 imp gal; 4.1 US gal)
- Related: Yamaha RD250

The Yamaha RD350 is a two-stroke motorcycle produced by Yamaha from 1973 to 1975. It evolved directly from the piston port (pre-reed valve intake tract), front drum-braked, five-speed Yamaha 350 cc "R5".

The engine is an air-cooled, parallel twin, six-speed (in some markets, such as the UK, the first model was sold in five-speed form), reed valve-equipped intake tract two-stroke engine. The bike is usually referred to as a sport bike.

All models were equipped with "Autolube" automatic oil injection, relieving the user from the need to mix gasoline and two-stroke oil.

Rim sizes are 18" WM2 (1.85") front and 18" WM3 (2.15") rear, both being of chromed, wire spoked steel construction. In the UK, rim sizes were 1.60 front and 1.85 rear.

Brakes are: single front disc brake and a rear drum brake, a combination described by Cycle Magazine as the best in its class.

The frame dimensions of the street 350 are very similar to the Yamaha TZ 250 and TZ 350 series factory road race bikes, differing mainly in weight and front fork rake – the RD being ~27 degrees and the TZ being ~25 degrees. The frames appear similar, side by side, with the street frame adorned with many brackets for the street equipment. The weight difference is substantial though, with the street-going RD frame weighing almost twice as much as the "TZ" roadrace race frame.

The stock bike made 39 bhp (29 kW) (32 bhp (24 kW) at the back wheel) at 7500 rpm – very fast for the time. A contemporary of the RD is the Kawasaki H2 750cc Triple that produced 74 hp.

The 350 evolved into the more refined and cleaner running RD400C in 1976, the "D" and "E" in 77–78 and the final model, the white 1979 RD400F. World's most favorite bike in the segment at that time

== The RD350B in India ==
A licensed version of the RD350B was assembled in India between 1983 and 1990 by Escorts group under the brand name Rajdoot 350. It did not repeat the success of the RD350B in the Indian market, which some attribute to a high purchase price and poor fuel efficiency. However, it established Rajdoot/Yamaha as a performance bike manufacturer in India. There were two models for the Rajdoot 350 - High Torque and Low Torque. Compared to the Yamaha RD350B that made 39 bhp (29 kW) at the crankshaft, the 'High Torque' version made 30.5 bhp (22.7 kW) and the later 'Low Torque' made only 27 bhp (20 kW), the engine being detuned in the quest for better fuel economy. By the time the production ended in 1990, the bike was nearly 100% sourced in India, with very little Japanese parts content.

Brakes are: 180mm dia drum brakes front internal expansion (twin leading type) and rear single internal expansion.

The RD350 was the first sporting motorcycle built in India, and it still enjoys cult status, with many RD clubs around the country. Around 7000 were made at the end of 1990.

== See also ==
- List of Yamaha motorcycles
  - The Yamaha RD History
