= Skatecycle =

Self propelled skate

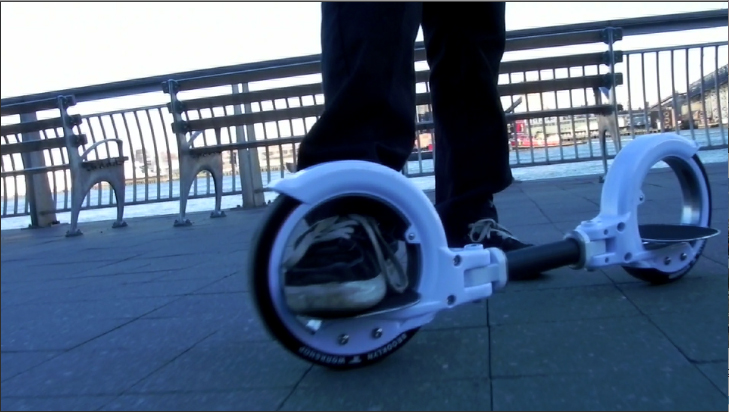
Skatecycle

The Skatecycle, also known as the Freerider Skatecycle, is the world's first mass-produced hubless, self-propelled skate. Invented and patented by Alon Karpman, the Skatecycle was manufactured by Brooklyn Workshop, Inc. based at that time in Red Hook, Brooklyn. Unlike most traditional skateboards, the user does not need to continuously push off the ground to gain and maintain speed. The Skatecycle is part of the permanent collection at the Henry Ford Museum and the Bicycle Museum of America.

== Design ==
The Skatecycle contains a double-jointed twisting axle connected to two standing platforms surrounded by 9" polyurethane wheels. A hubless wheel is present on both sides of the axle. In order to engage the unit, the rider needs to twist their feet inwards and outwards. The Skatecycle measures 32" x 6.5" x 8.5″ (LWH) in dimension and weighs 7 1/4 lbs.

== Awards ==
- Core 77 Design Awards: Runner Up (Professional Notable)
- Bronze 2010 IDEA award in the transportation category (as part of this award, the Skatecycle became part of the permanent collection at the Henry Ford Museum).
