= Yamaha R5 =

1970–72 motorcycle

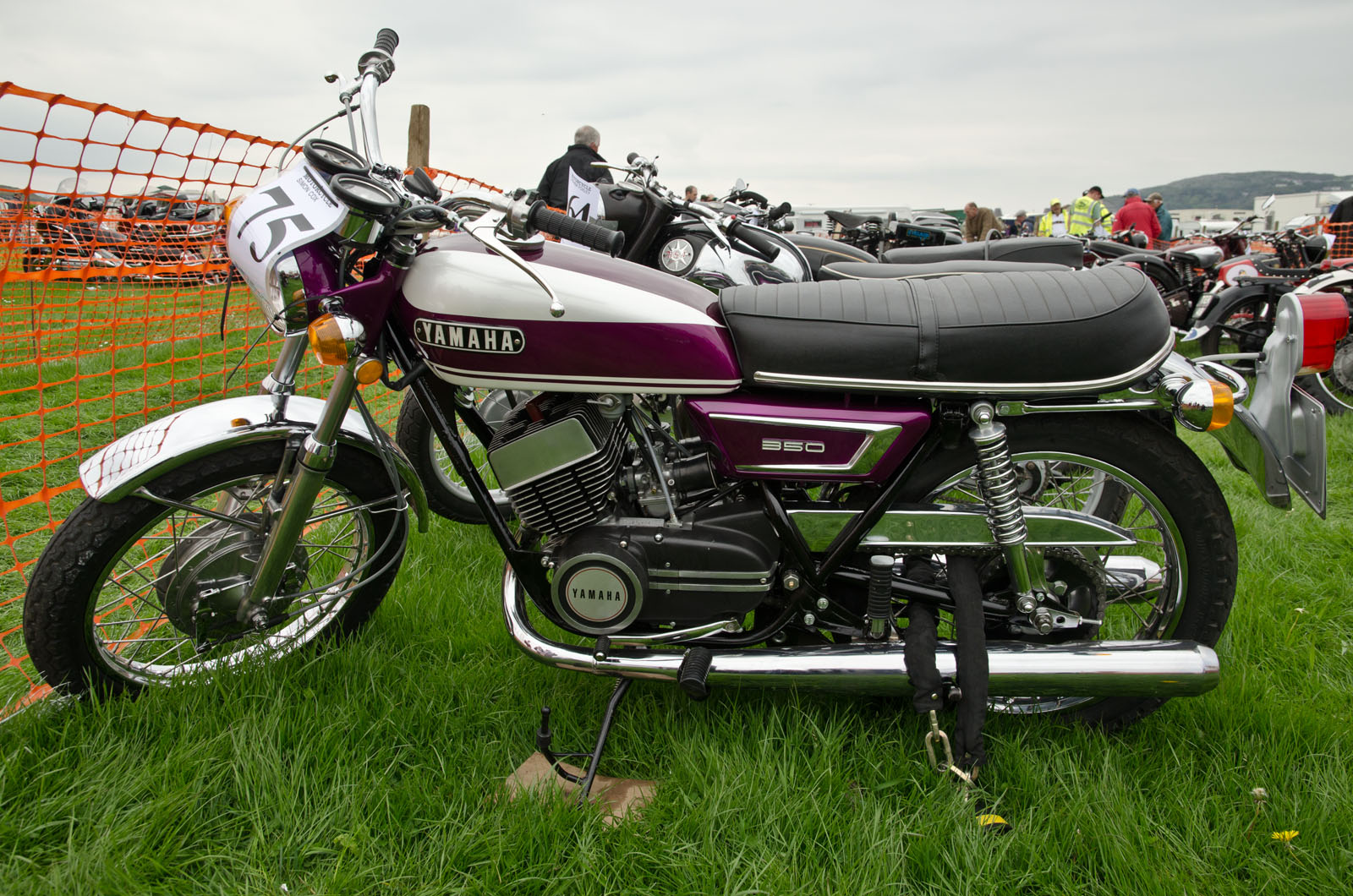
Yamaha R5 (1972)

The Yamaha R5 is a motorcycle made by Yamaha for production years 1970 (R5), 1971 (R5B) and 1972 (R5C). It was the first iteration of a new generation of horizontally split crankcase two strokes that also included the RD350 and culminated in the RD400. The engine platform also included the 250cc variants (DS7/RD250). Two earlier generations of sporting 250cc and larger displacement air-cooled two strokes preceded the R5 dating back to 1959.

== History ==
Yamaha began producing air-cooled "sport tuned" 250cc twin cylinder roadsters in 1959. Development led to increased capacity in 1965 to 305cc (YM1) and in 1967 to 350cc YR1. These are the ancestral predecessors to the 1970 350cc R5 and represent two different generations of engine evolution and design. The 1967 YR1, 1968 YR2 and 1969 R3 (YR3) directly preceded the R5 and were Yamaha's first publicly available 350cc capacity air-cooled, two stroke twins. The R5 was superseded by the 1973-1975 RD350 and 1976-1979 RD400. Several technical changes were made to the RD platform, the most significant of which being the six-speed transmission and reed valve induction. Though different in appearance the R5 basic architecture lived on in the RZ350 (American market) and RD350LC (Euro market). The main difference being the cylinders became water-cooled. The engine cases are similar enough that, with modifications, they can be interchanged.

== Identification ==
Year	Model	Dominant Color	Secondary Color
1970	R5A	Metallic Purple	White
1971	R5B	Mandarin Orange	White
1972/3	R5C	Mandarin Orange	Black

== The two-stroke era ==
In the early 1970s, a 350 cc (21 cu in) engine was considered large for a two-stroke engine. Two-stroke street motorcycles from Yamaha, Suzuki and Kawasaki collectively developed a reputation as "giant-killers". Even though four-stroke motorcycle engines (not chassis) were being developed rapidly, during the 1970s, two-strokes were able to beat them in straight-line performance at times. Because of the lighter weight of the engine and chassis, two-strokes were typically dominant on curved roads.

During the '70s, the two stroke developments were between Kawasaki, Suzuki, and Yamaha. At this time, Soichiro Honda was alive and active in his company. He did not personally like two-strokes, so Honda stayed focused on four-strokes. As the decade went by, Suzuki added displacement, cylinders, and water cooling, culminating in the GT750, a touring bike. Kawasaki added cylinders and displacement, ending with the infamous H2 750 Mach IV. By default, Yamaha became the bantamweight, maxing out with a 400 cc (24 cu in) twin, still air-cooled.

== Racing ==
In the early days of the Yamaha racing team, factory race bikes were not as specialized as they are now. In fact, they were hand-built versions of the production street bikes. Beginning with the basic parts of an R5, the racing TR3 model was built.
