= Böhmerland (motorcycle) =

Company

Čechie (Böhmerland)
- Founded: 1924
- Defunct: 1939
- Headquarters: Czechoslovakia
- Key people: Albin Liebisch, designer
- Products: Motorcycles
- Number of employees: 20

Böhmerland, or Čechie as it was known domestically, was a Czechoslovak motorcycle manufacturer from 1924 until World War II. Almost all aspects of this distinctive motorcycle were designed by Albin Liebisch, including the extremely long, all-welded tube-frame chassis, the built-up leading-link front forks, and solid cast aluminum wheels, which were an industry first, not widely adopted until the 1970s. The overhead valve single-cylinder engines were typically 600 cc (37 cu in) with a bore and stroke of 78 mm × 120 mm (3.1 in × 4.7 in). The Böhmerland was produced in several wheelbases; a two-seat Sport, a 3-seat Touren, and a 4-seat Langtouren. An experimental machine built for the military seated four soldiers, and used two gearboxes, with the rear operated by a passenger, giving 9 ratios. The Langtouren model is notable for having the longest wheelbase of any production motorcycle, 3.2 metres (10.5 ft). Around 775 total machines emerged from Liebisch's factory in Schönlinde and later in Kunratice, Sudetenland, Czechoslovakia. The factory employed 20 workers, assembling parts manufactured locally to Leibisch's specification.

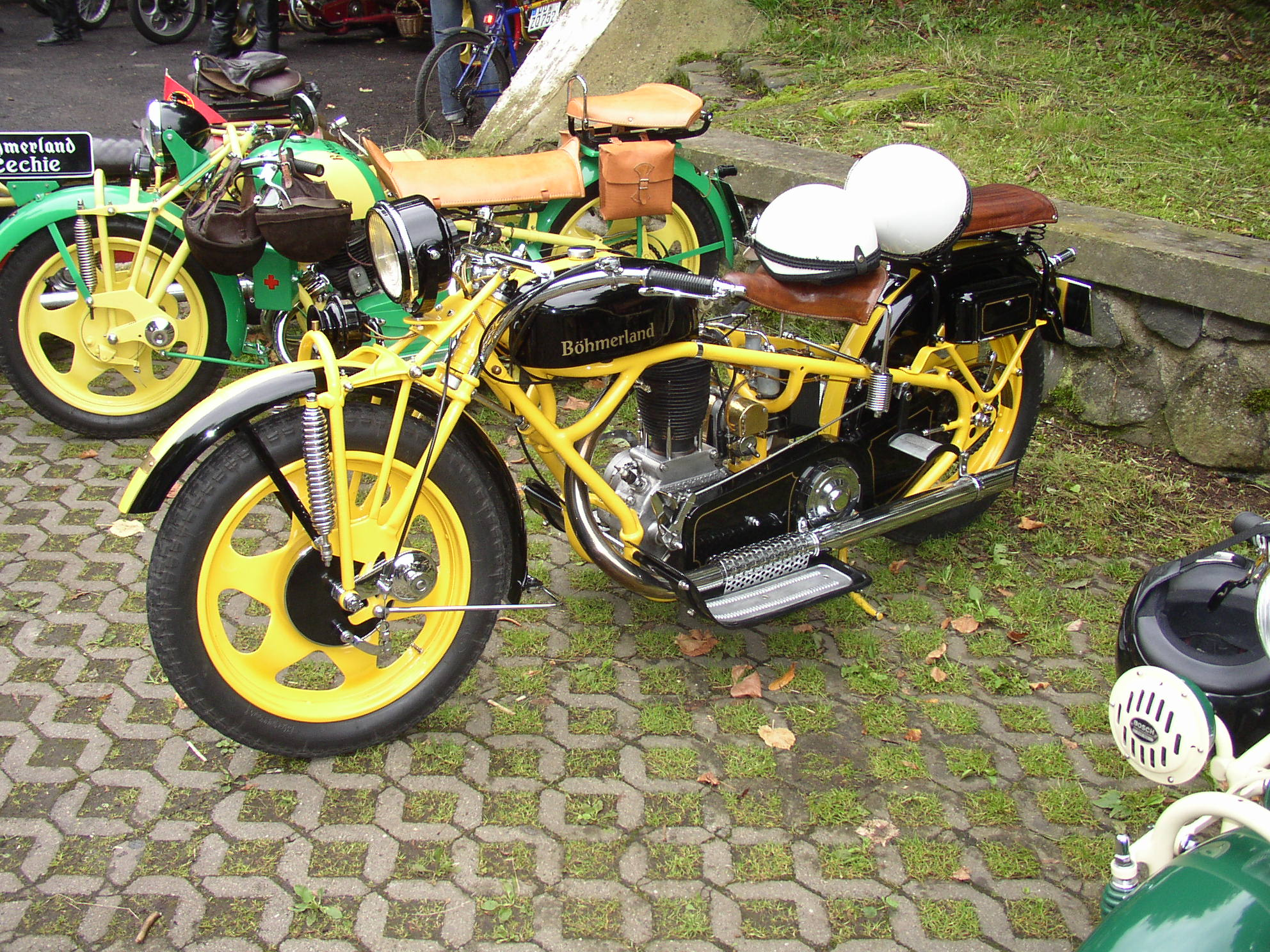
A short-wheelbase two-seat Böhmerland with a conventional fuel tank

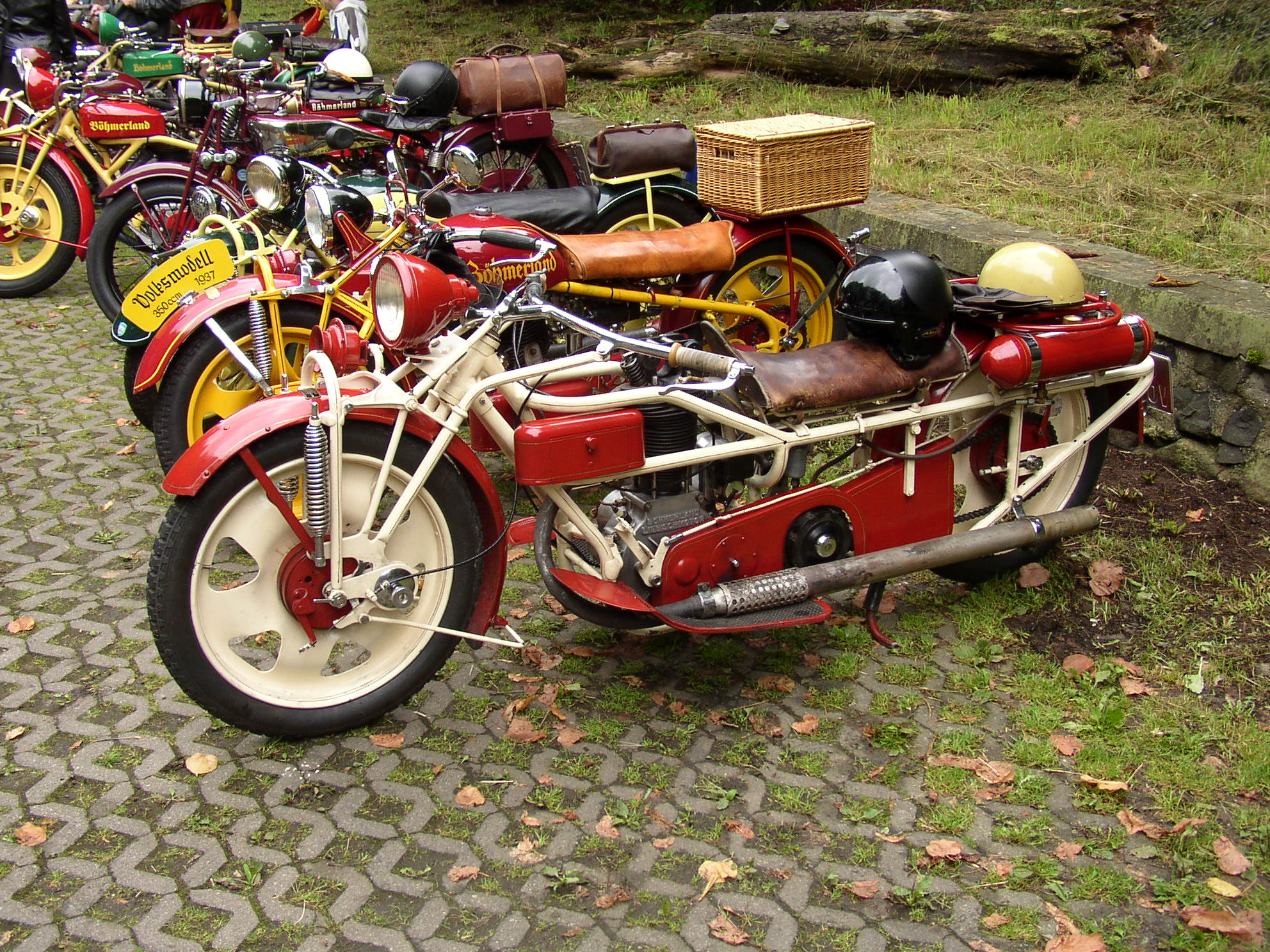
Böhmerland motorcycles

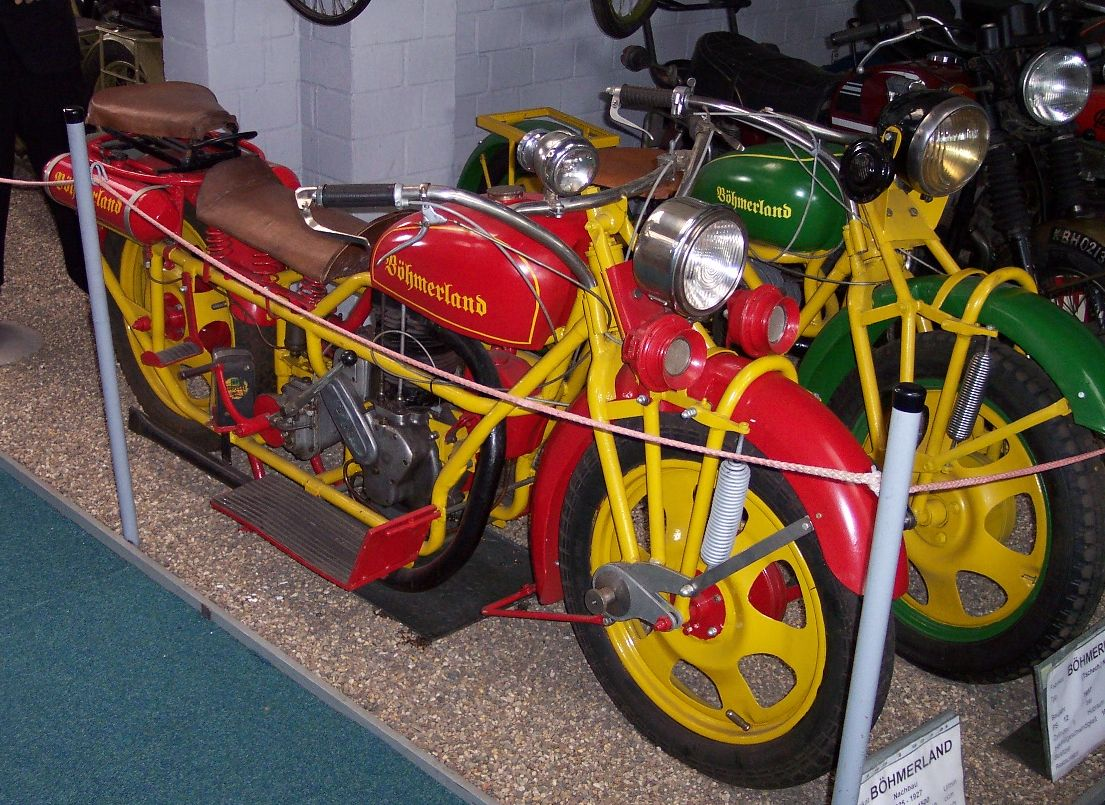
Böhmerland replica

== Literature ==
- Jan Němec (2010): Legendární motocykl Čechie, Grada, Praha ISBN 978-80-247-3119-3
- Miroslav Gomola (2000): Motocykly Čechie-Böhmerland, AGM CZ, Brno ISBN 80-85991-11-X
- Ivan Margolius (2020): Modernism on Two Wheels, The Automobile, May 2020, UK, s. 52 - 55. ISNN 0955-1328
