= Mercedes-Benz Silver Lightning =

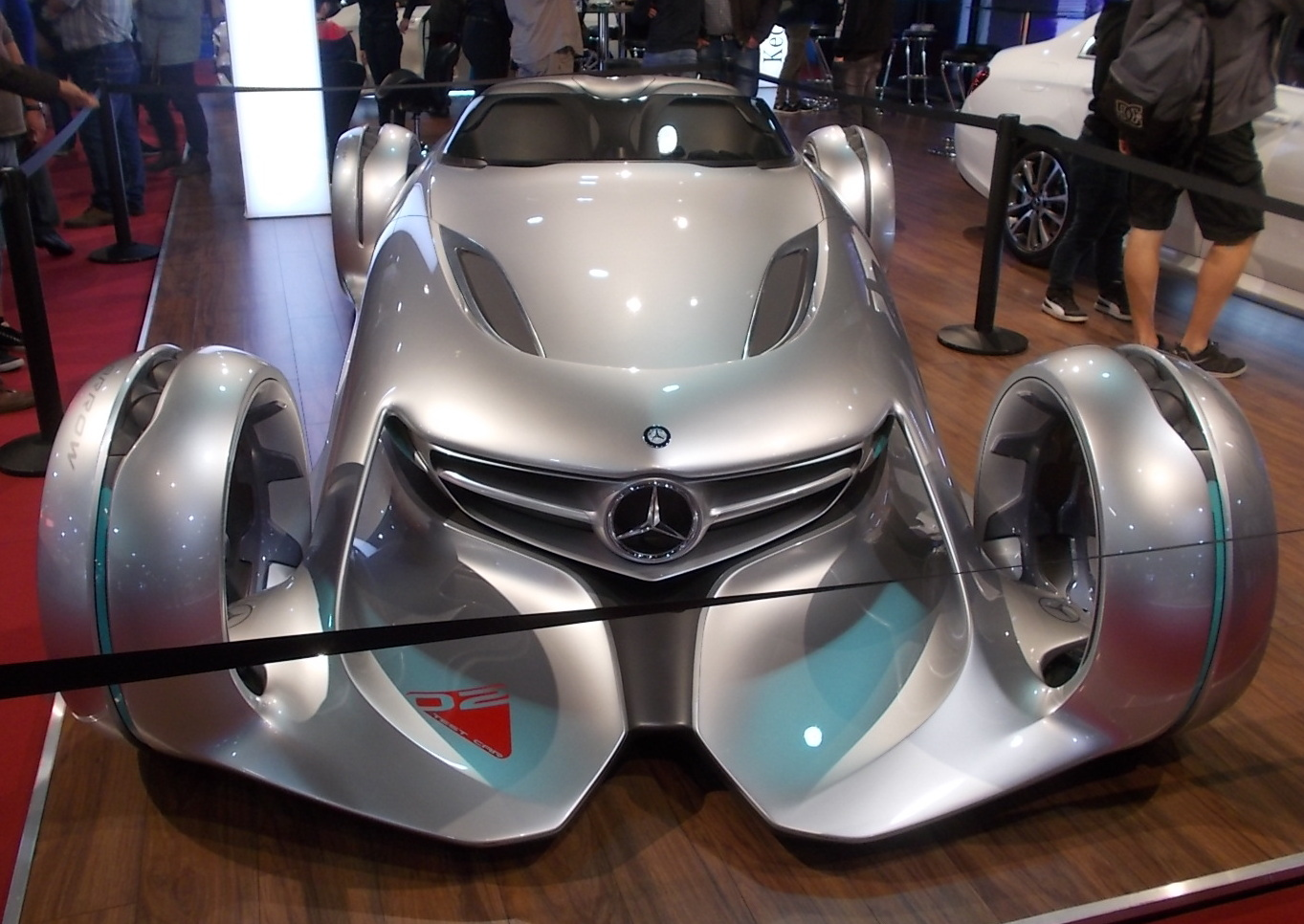

Overview
- Manufacturer: Daimler AG
- Also called: Mercedes-Benz Silver Arrow
- Production: 2011 (concept car)

Body and chassis
- Class: Sports car (S)
- Body style: 2-door Targa top roadster
- Layout: individual-wheel drive

Powertrain
- Electric motor: Omni-Directional motors (one motor at each wheel)
- Battery: lithium ion batteries

Chronology
- Predecessor: Mercedes-Benz Biome

The Mercedes-Benz Silver Lightning, also called the Silver Arrow, is a concept car built for the 2011 Los Angeles Auto Show Design Challenge, where it won the best animation award for their short film Silver Lightning. It was conceived by the Mercedes-Benz Advanced Design Studio in Carlsbad, California, who also previously created the Mercedes-Benz Biome.

== Design ==
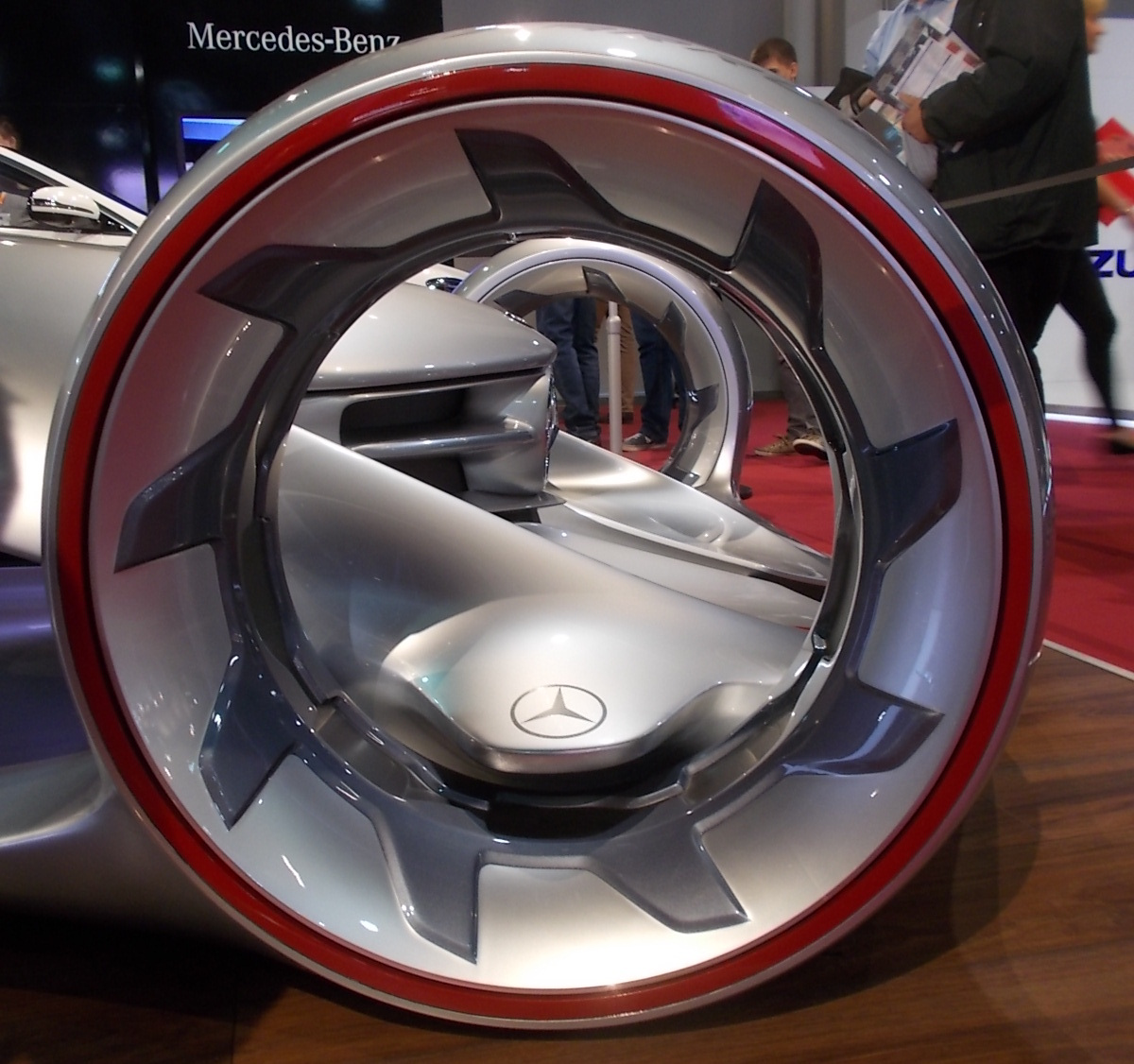
The Silver Lightning featured centreless wheels

The Silver Lightning drew heavy inspiration from the 1930s Silver Arrow race cars, most notably the Mercedes-Benz W125 driven by Rudolf Caracciola that won the 1937 Grand Prix, as well as the famous 1955 Mercedes-Benz 300 SLR designed by Rudolf Uhlenhaut. The design theme was also influenced by some sci-fi movies, such as Star Trek, Tron: Legacy and Star Wars: Episode II – Attack of the Clones.

Its roof is constructed of several pieces of small, lightweight magnetic squares, and uses Mag-Tech technology that allows them to either combine to form a hardtop, or retracted to convert the car into a roadster. The omni-directional wheels allow the Silver Lightning to be able to steer freely in any direction, and are enclosed in rings integrated within the car's main body.

To comply with the competition's theme of designing "Hollywood’s Hottest New Movie Car", it was accompanied by a short film called Silver Lightning, which features two crash test dummies called Hans05 and Franz02 attempting and eventually succeeding in the rescue of their prized stolen Silver Lightning from Dr. Crash-Barrier, the main antagonist of the movie.

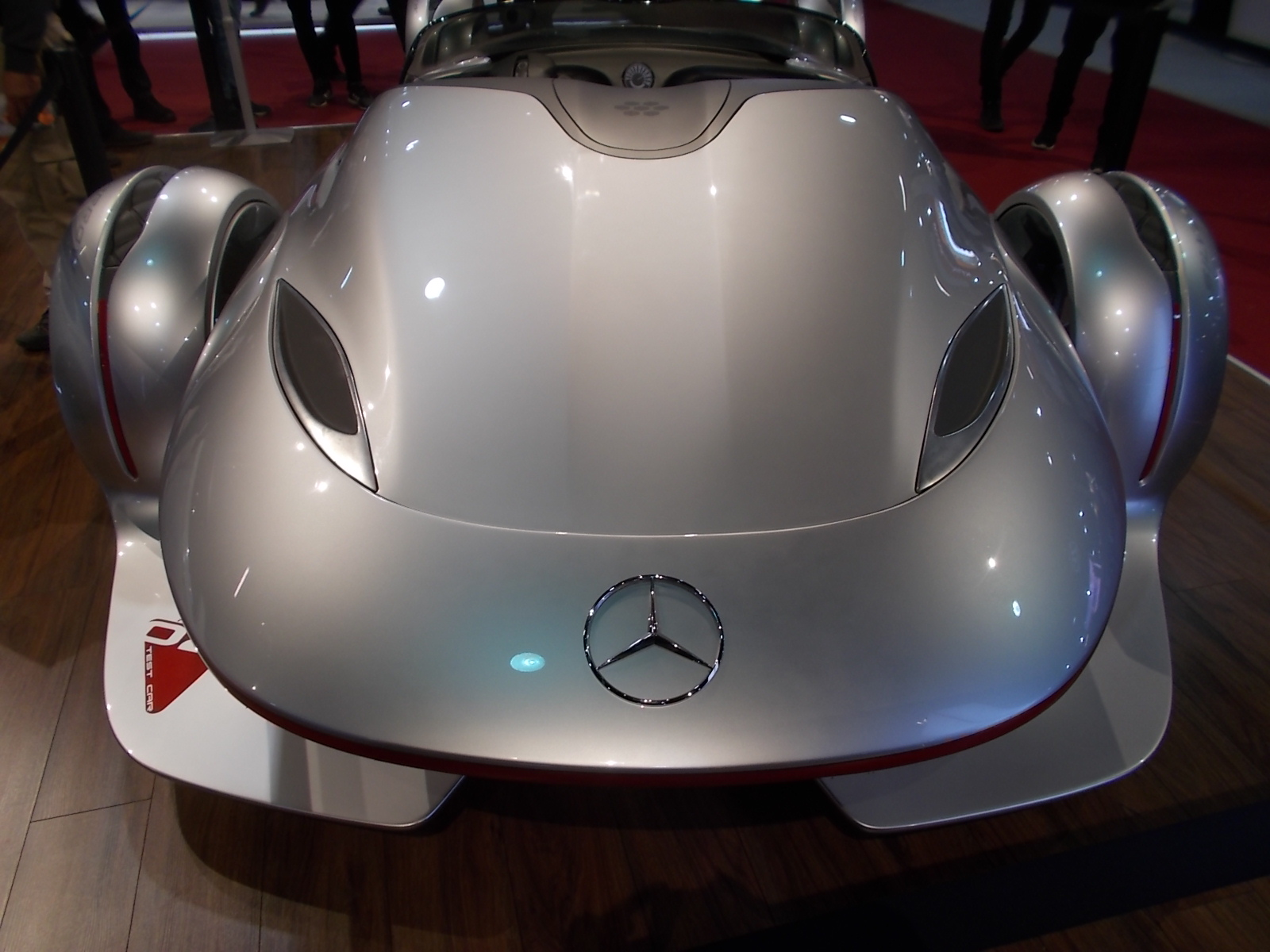
Mercedes Silver Arrow/Lightning rear view

== In video games ==
The concept car makes an appearance in Asphalt 8: Airborne, Asphalt Nitro and Asphalt Legends.
