= Motorcycle wheel =

Component of motorised two-wheelers

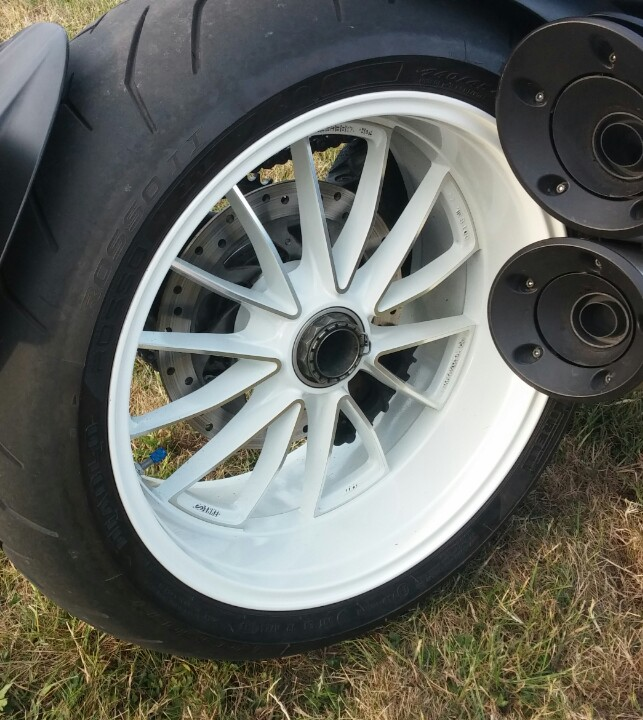
Rear wheel of a Ducati Diavel

Motorcycle wheels are made to cope with radial and axial forces. They also provide a way of mounting other critical components such as the brakes, final drive and suspension. Wheels, and anything directly connected to them, are considered to be unsprung mass. Traditionally motorcycles used wire-spoked wheels with inner tubes and pneumatic tyres. Although cast wheels were first used on a motorcycle in 1927, it would not be until the 1970s that mainstream manufacturers would start to introduce cast wheels on their roadgoing motorcycles. Spoked wheels are usually made using steel spokes with steel or aluminium rims. Cast wheels are predominantly made from an aluminium-alloy, but can also be made from more-exotic materials, such as magnesium content alloy or carbon fibre.

== History ==
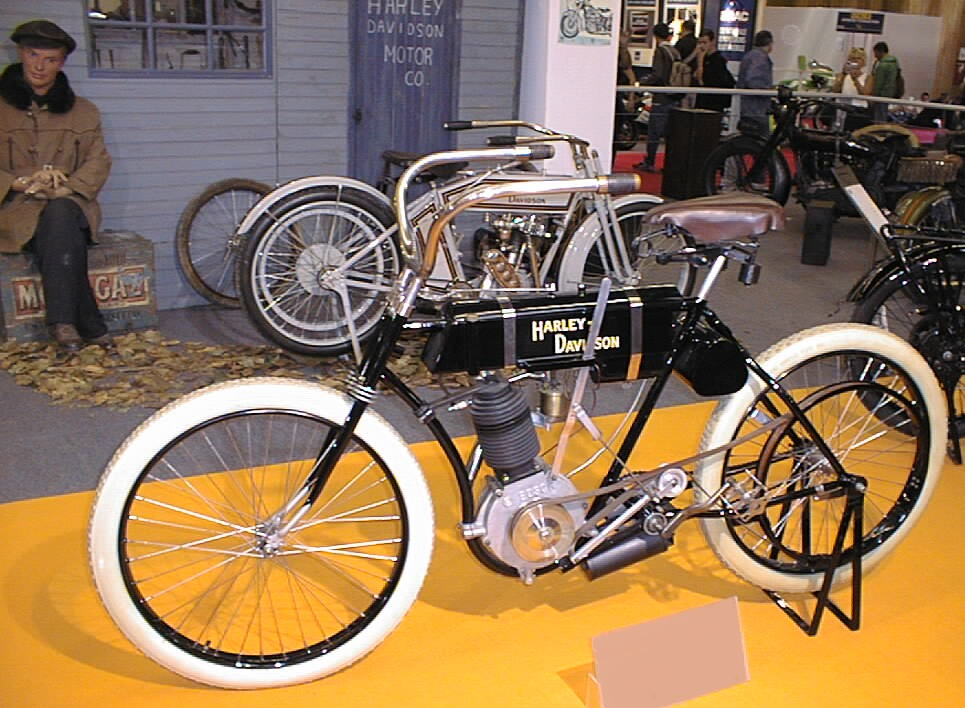
Wire wheels on the first Harley-Davidson motorcycle

The first commercial motorcycles were built like bicycles, with wire wheels as bicycles had traditionally been fitted with. The Steffey motorcycle in 1902, essentially a bicycle with a two-stroke engine attached, used wooden, rims with wire spokes. This style of wheel evolved into a stouter motorcycle-specific wheel, still with spokes, up to the 1960s and beyond.

In April, 1922, Borrani started production of motorcycle wheels with an aluminium rim.

Although cast wheels had already been used on automobiles previously, it was not until the 1927 that the Böhmerland, a motorcycle built in Czechoslovakia was fitted with cast wheels.

BMW patented a spoked wheel that cross ran the spokes onto the outside of the rim, allowing the use of tubeless tires.

By the late 2000s, a number of materials and designs in addition to traditional spoked wheels were available, including cast, spun or forged aluminum; cast or forged magnesium; and single-layup or composite carbon fiber.

== Cast alloy wheels ==
=== Development ===
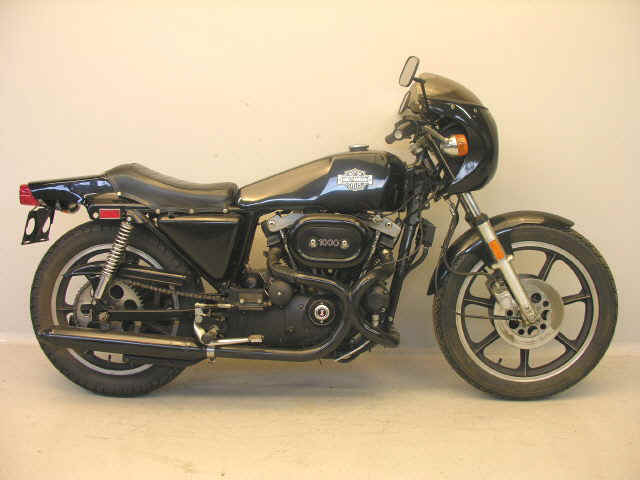
A 1977 Harley-Davidson XLCR with seven-spoke alloy wheels manufactured by Morris

High-performance motorcycles began to use cast alloy wheels (usually aluminum but sometimes magnesium) as early as the Münch Mammoth, with its single cast-elektron rear wheel which was shown at the Intermot motorcycle show at Cologne in late 1966. Elliott Morris began producing seven-spoke cast magnesium racing wheels in 1973.

In November 1974 the Van Veen was exhibited at the Cologne motorcycle show with front and rear cast wheels and triple Brembo disc brakes for their 1975 Model Year rotary-engined OCR1000 machines. Aftermarket cast wheels for Japanese makes having drum rear and front disc brakes were available in UK from late 1974.

A patent for a cast alloy motorcycle wheel was filed in 1974 and assigned to Carroll Shelby's Shelby-Dowd Industries; and in early 1975 Thomas J. Lester of then-named Lester Tire Company had applied for a patent on composite cast motorcycle wheel construction (with a press-fit hub). By mid 1975, Shelby-Dowd aftermarket cast alloy wheels were advertised for sale. In November 1975, Harley-Davidson, Moto Guzzi and Ducati all showed factory models fitted with alloy wheels at the EICMA show in Milan. By 1976, two more manufacturers were offering aftermarket cast aluminum wheels: Henry Abe of Osaka, Japan (now Daytona Global); and Lester Industries of Ohio (now a division of ITT).

In 1975, the Moto Guzzi 850 Le Mans and the MV Agusta 750 America were available with alloy wheels as an option. Italian manufacturer Fantic produce a step-through moped named 'Roma' with 10 in (250 mm) cast wheels as standard specification in 1975.

The Yamaha RD400C sold in 1976 was the first motorcycle by a major manufacturer to be fitted with cast wheels. The cast wheels weighed 100 grams (3.5 oz) more than the spoked wheels fitted to its RD350 predecessor.

Honda began offering their Comstar composite wheels in 1977, marking the first time a manufacturer had included tubeless tires on a production motorcycle. At the same time as Honda's Comstar, Dawson Harmsworth firm in Sheffield, England produced a similar composite wheel from 1977 with generally comparable appearance, materials and construction. Initially intended for road racing applications, the wheel was specified for some models in the early 1980s Hesketh low-volume production road motorcycle range. Twenty years after the original business closed, the wheel is again being manufactured by a new business established by a former employee of Dawson Harmsworth.

=== Advantages ===
The advantages of the cast wheels versus spoked are several, and include better runout tolerance and the elimination of spoke maintenance; better rigidity and thus better handling; weight reduction due to smaller hub size; and better handling of side loads for motorcycles with sidecar rigs.

== Brakes ==
Early motorcycles used brake mechanisms such as spoon brake independent of the wheels, but modern machines use drum or disc brakes integrated with the wheels.

In a bid to improve wet weather braking performance, Spanish manufacturer Sanglas in 1976 fitted inboard front brakes to their top model, the 500S, followed in the 1980s by Honda models such as the VF400F and CBX500F. These used the front brake assembly enclosed in a vented aluminium hub to keep the mechanism dry.

Buell Motorcycle Company introduced a rim-mounted "zero torsional load" disc brake that was claimed to reduce unsprung weight in the wheel-brake system, including lighter wheel spokes that carried no braking load. This style is generically termed a "perimeter brake" for its point of attachment to the wheel, and had been used in smaller numbers by other manufacturers before Buell. They can rarely be found on custom motorcycle spoked wheels.

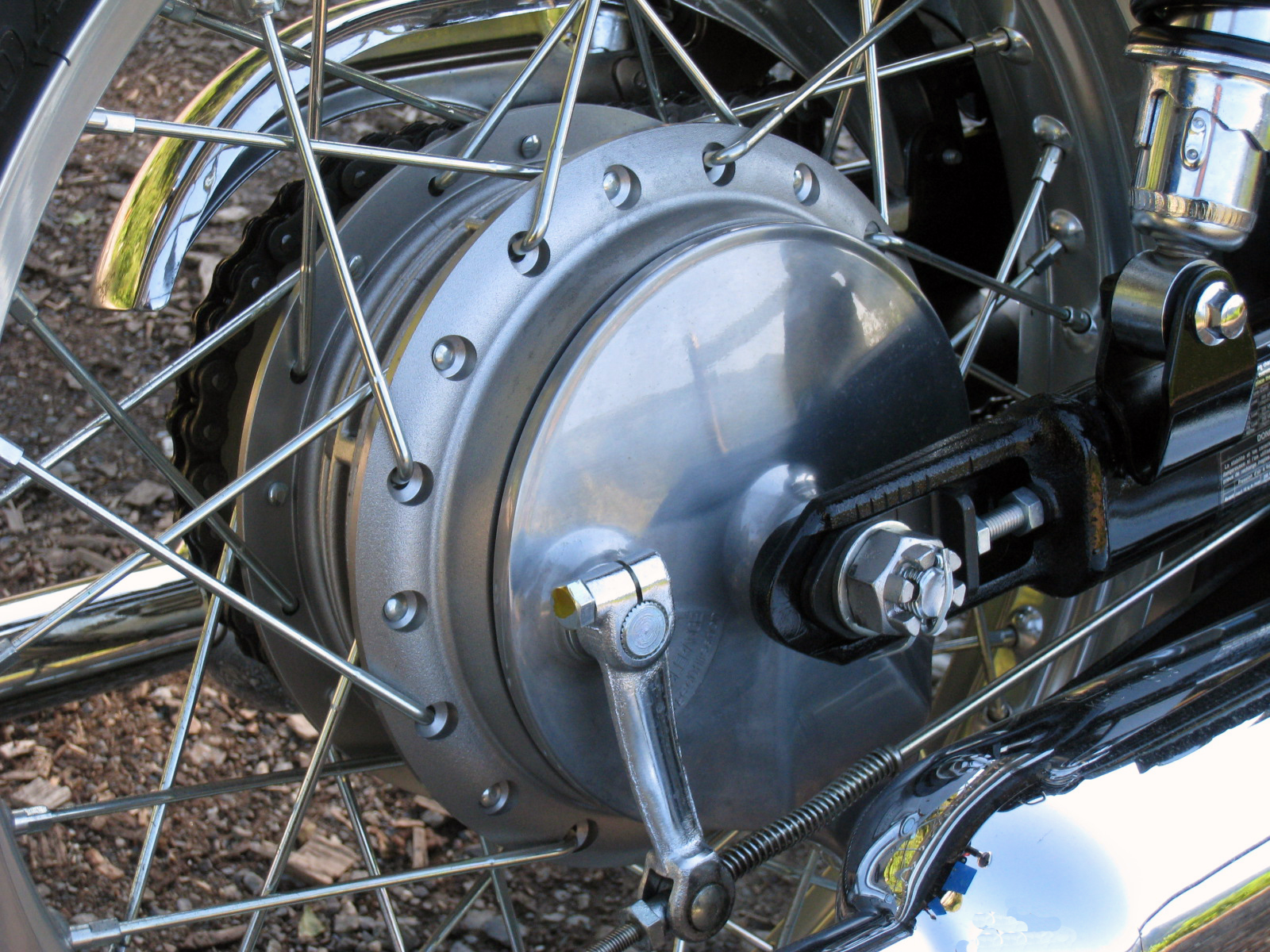
A drum brake at the spoked rear wheel of a Kawasaki W800

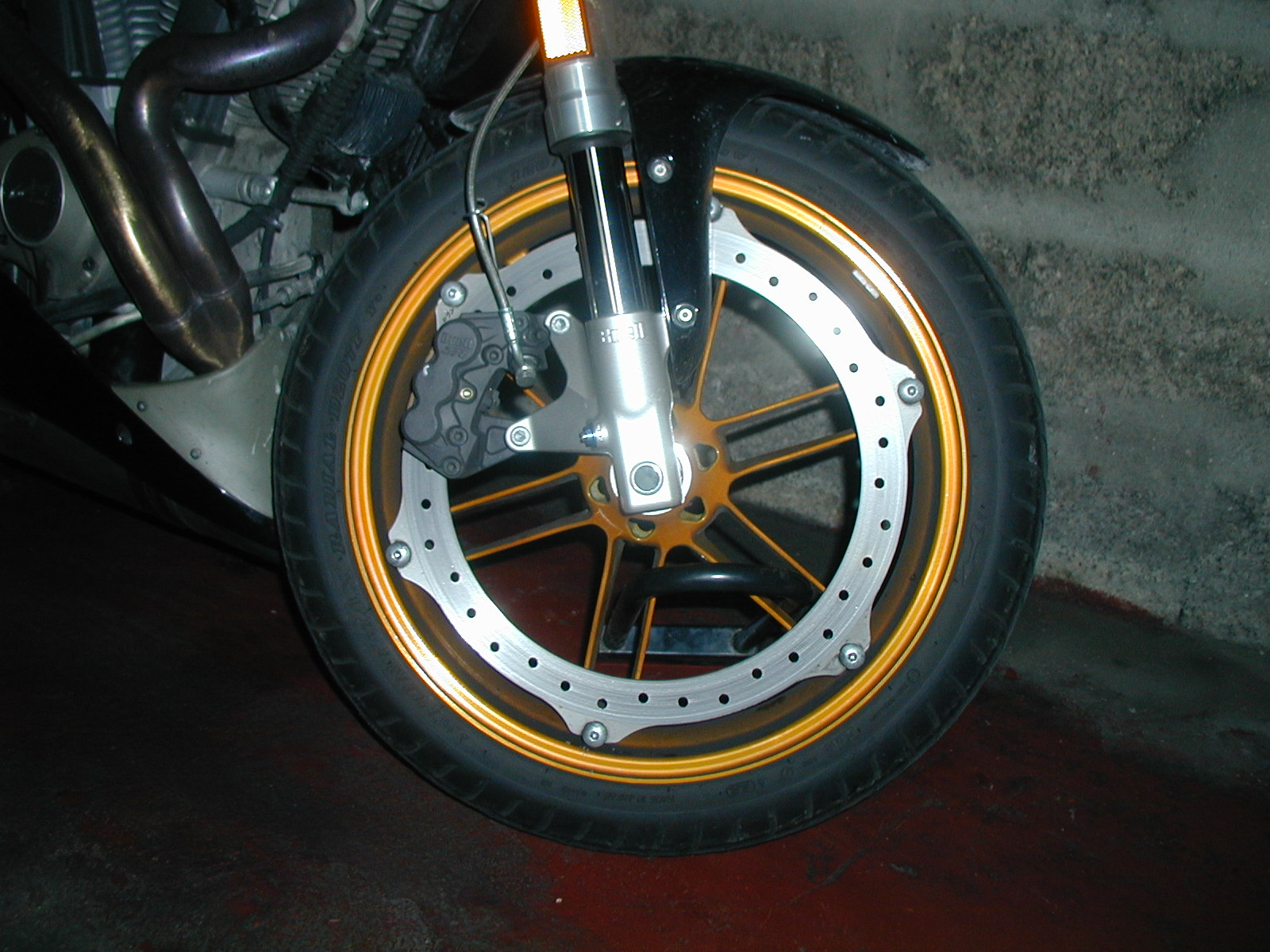
Buell wheel and perimeter brake

== Exotic ==
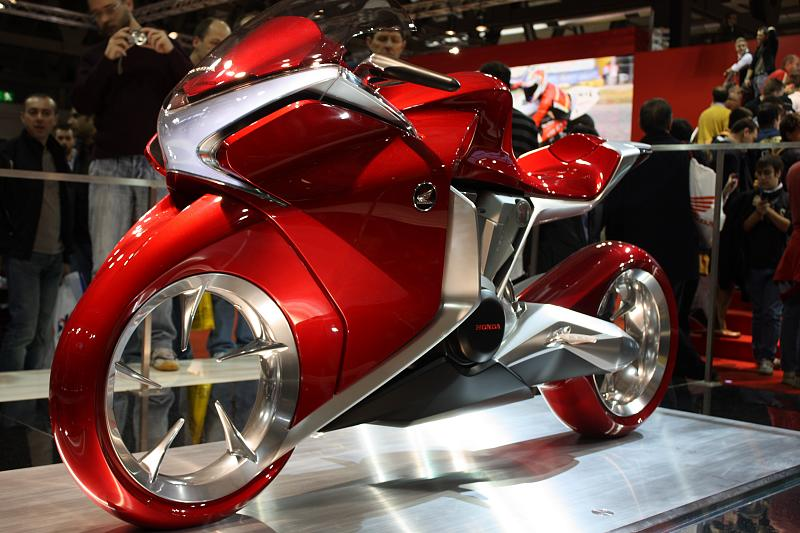
Honda 4V concept motorcycle with centreless wheel on display at the EICMA trade show

Exotic wheel technologies like hub-center steering and the centreless wheel have not gained wide adoption. Hub-center steering is used in special applications, such as on land speed racing streamliners at Bonneville Speed Week, as it allows for a very compact, low-profile steering assembly when frontal area of the vehicle needs to be kept as small as possible to reduce air drag.
