= Yamaha RD400 =

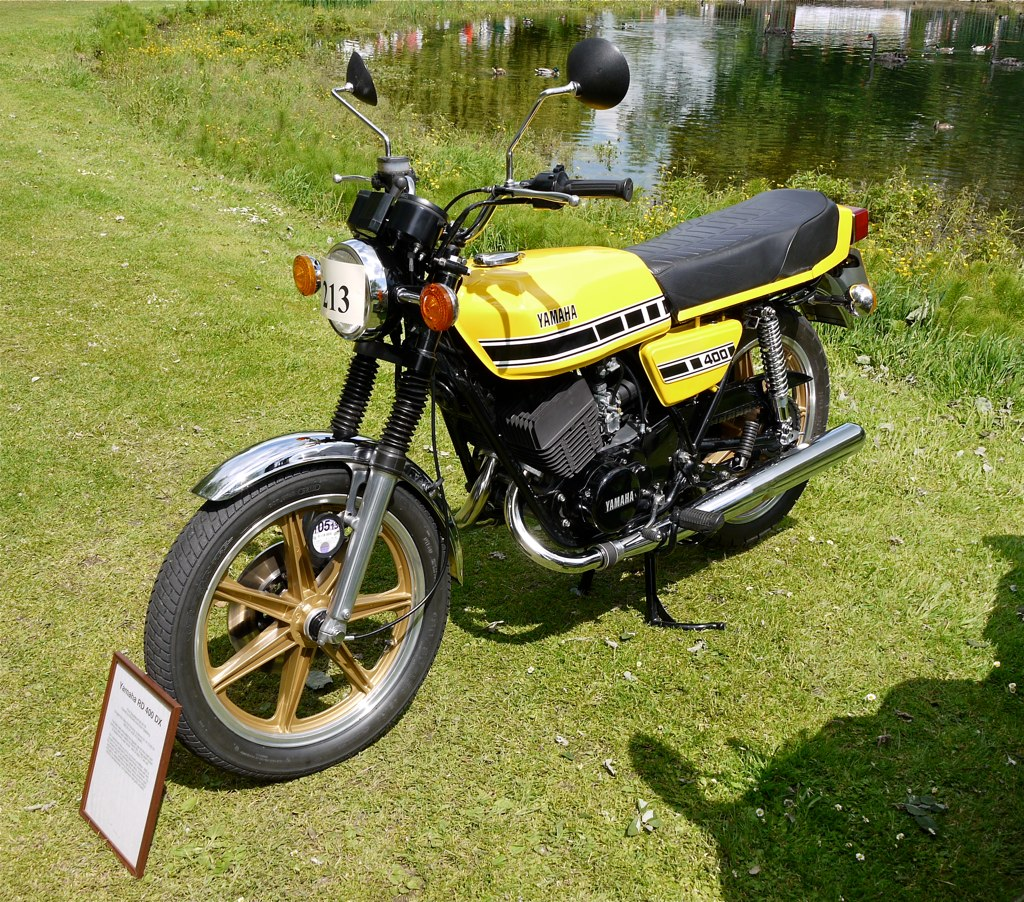
- 1978 Yamaha RD400D
- Manufacturer: Yamaha Motor Company
- Production: 1975–1980; 1976–1979 (model years)
- Predecessor: Yamaha RD350
- Successor: Yamaha RD350LC
- Class: Standard
- Engine: 399 cc (24.3 cu in), air-cooled, two-stroke, straight twin
- Bore / stroke: 64 mm × 62 mm (2.5 in × 2.4 in)
- Compression ratio: 6.2:1
- Top speed: 106.8 mph (171.9 km/h)
- Power: 44 bhp (33 kW) @ 7,000 rpm
- Torque: 30.3 lb⋅ft (41.1 N⋅m) @ 6,500 rpm
- Ignition type: Kick start: points (CDI ignition from 1978)
- Transmission: 6-speed manual, chain final drive
- Frame type: Tubular twin cradle
- Suspension: Front: telescopic forks Rear: swingarm with twin rear shock absorbers
- Brakes: Single disc brake, front and rear
- Tires: Front: 3.00 x 18; Rear: 3.50 x 18
- Rake, trail: 27.5°, 110 mm (4.3 in)
- Wheelbase: 1,330 mm (52.5 in)
- Dimensions: W: 800 mm (31.5 in)
- Seat height: 800 mm (31.5 in)
- Weight: 165 kg (364 lb) (with 4.5 L; 1.2 US gal (1 imp gal) of fuel) (wet)
- Fuel capacity: 16.5 L (3.6 imp gal; 4.4 US gal)
- Oil capacity: 1.6 litres (1.7 US qt)
- Fuel consumption: 30 to 42 mpg_{‑imp} (9.4 to 6.7 L/100 km; 25 to 35 mpg_{‑US})
- Related: Yamaha RD250

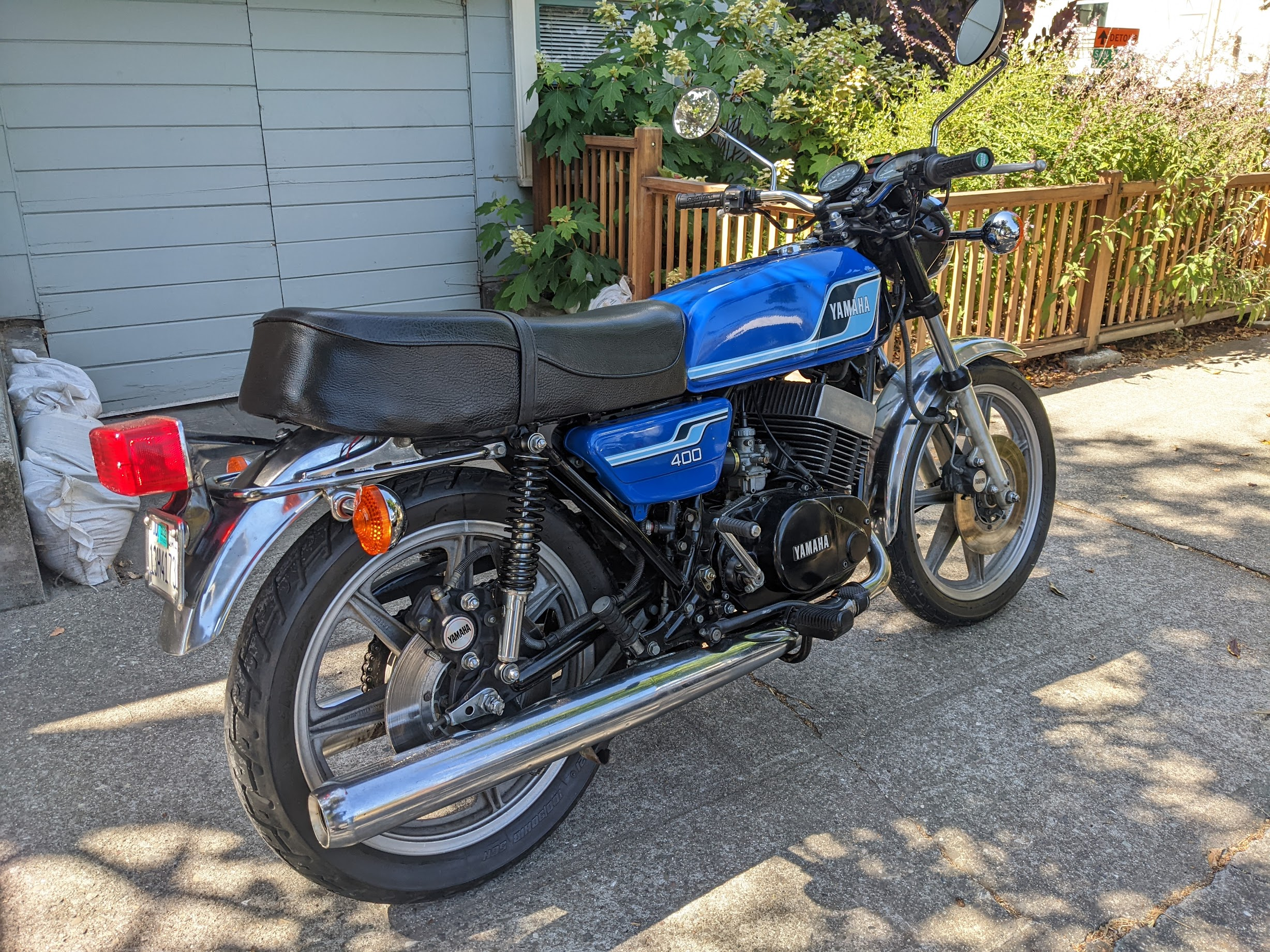
1977 RD400 US Model in Blue

The Yamaha RD400 is a 399 cc (24.3 cu in) two-stroke air cooled six-speed motorcycle produced by Yamaha from 1976 until 1979. It evolved directly from the Yamaha RD350. The 350 evolved into the RD400C in 1976, the "D", "E" in '77, '78 respectively and the final model, the white 1979 RD400F. (The model year for the first RD400 which was sold in the U.S. was 1976.) Models for the USA had a smaller tank with slightly different shape and only had points ignition until the introduction of the RD400 Daytona (designated "F" in the USA - no relation to the RD400F that every other territory got in 1979).

The RD series was discontinued in the USA due to new emissions rules in the early 80's (by which time the last model was the renamed RZ350 water cooled motorcycle). The RD series continued to be sold around the rest of the world into the late 1980s.

The RD400 came with a unique self-cancelling direction indicator light system that measured pulses from the speedo after the indicator lights were enabled and cancelled the indicators after a certain distance and time had elapsed. Also, for convenience, the RD did not require pre-mix fuel in the tank since it came with a 2-stroke oil tank and pump which delivered the appropriate amount of oil when the throttle was engaged.

The brakes were single disc front and rear. These were optional on the RD400C as it came standard with spoked wheels and a drum rear brake. Picking the cast wheel option gave a disc rear brake as well. In Germany, these RD models came with spoked wire wheels AND front and rear brake discs. It could complete a standing quarter-mile in 14.01 seconds.

The RD400C was the first motorcycle by a major manufacturer to be fitted with cast wheels.

In 1978 the RD400E was fitted with a capacitor discharge electronic ignition (CDI) unit, as well as thinner spoked cast wheels, a new foot peg position, and some minor engine modifications with revisions to cylinder porting and carburettor specs.

The motorcycle is notable for being used by Bruce Lee as the motorbike in Game of Death

== See also ==
- List of Yamaha motorcycles
