= List of Honda three-wheeled all-terrain vehicles =

Honda began researching All Terrain Vehicles as early as 1967. Within 18 months they had designed and shipped their first three-wheeled vehicle, designated US90, as a 1970 model. Honda's dominance of the ATC market peaked in 1984, with 370,000 units shipped and a 69% market share. In 1985, Honda offered their most diverse line-up, with ten models available. Honda remained the leader in production and sales until voluntarily exiting the ATC market in 1987.

== Production models ==
- ATC70, 1973–1974, 1978–1985
- ATC90, 1970–1978
- ATC110, 1979–1985
- ATC125M, 1984–1987
- ATC185, 1980
- ATC185S, 1981–1983
- ATC200, 1981–1983
- ATC200E "Big Red", 1982–1984
- ATC200ES, 1984
- ATC200M, 1984–1985
- ATC200S, 1984–1986
- ATC200X, 1983-1987
- ATC250ES "Big Red", 1985-1987
- ATC250R, 1981-1986
- ATC250SX, 1985–1987
- ATC350X, 1985–1986
