= Agtech =

Agtech may refer to:

- Agricultural technology
- Genetic engineering or applied genetics technology
- AgTech Global Ag Solutions, New Zealand based research, testing and development company
- Ag-Tech Industries, New Zealand company and inventor of the ATV Lifeguard
