= OPD =

OPD may refer to:

== Police departments ==
- Oakland Police Department, a U.S. law enforcement agency in California
- Omaha Police Department, a U.S. law enforcement agency in Nebraska
- Orlando Police Department, a U.S. law enforcement agency in Florida

== Other uses ==
- o-phenylenediamine, a chemical compound
- Object Process Diagram, in object oriented programming
- One Per Desk, a 1980s personal computer and telecommunications terminal
- Optical path difference
- Organizational Process Definition
- Outpatient department, part of a hospital
- Overfill Protection Device, a safety mechanism incorporated in the valves of propane cylinders
- Pico dos Dias Observatory, a Brazilian astronomical observatory
- Office of Public Diplomacy, a US propaganda agency during the Reagan era
- Organic personality disorder
- Operator protection device, an Australian safety device for ATVs

== See also ==
- OPDS (disambiguation)
