= Honda ATC125M =

The Honda ATC125M was a three-wheeled All Terrain Cycle released in 1984, and received a major revision in 1986. The model was sold through 1987, when Honda voluntarily discontinued sales of ATC's. The first iteration can trace its development back to Honda's first ATC, the Honda US90, released in 1970, while the second iteration borrowed heavily from the ATC200 line.

== Horizontal ATC125M (1984-1985) ==
Horizontal ATC125M
- Manufacturer: Honda
- Production: 1984 - 1985
- Predecessor: ATC110
- Class: Recreational ATC
- Engine: 124 cc (7.6 cu in) Single-cylinder Horizontal OHV engine
- Bore / stroke: 54 x 52.2mm
- Compression ratio: 8.8:1 (156 - 198psi test)
- Top speed: <43 Mph
- Transmission: 4-Speed Auto-Clutch Dual Range
- Frame type: steel
- Suspension: None
- Brakes: F/R: Drum
- Tires: 22 x 11 x 8
- Wheelbase: 42.3 in.
- Dimensions: L: 65.9 in.
- Seat height: 25.4 in.
- Weight: 238 lbs. (dry)
- Oil capacity: 1 qt
- Footnotes / references References Provided via Factory Service Manual

The first iteration of the ATC125M (The Horizontal ATC125M) was an evolutionary advancement of the original US90 ATC released in 1970, the fourth revision of said cycle. It featured a 124cc Horizontal engine attached to a 4-Speed dual-range transmission to a chain final drive. The ATC125M added an electric starter, the first on a Horizontal-engine equipped Honda ATC, but continued to have drum brake.

== Vertical ATC125M (1986-1987) ==
Vertical ATC125M
- Manufacturer: Honda
- Production: 1986 - 1987
- Class: Recreational ATC
- Engine: 124 cc (7.6 cu in) Single-cylinder vertical mount OHV engine
- Bore / stroke: 54 x 54.5mm
- Compression ratio: 175 - 203psi
- Top speed: <35 Mph
- Transmission: 5-Speed w/Reverse
- Frame type: steel
- Suspension: None
- Wheelbase: 42.7 in.
- Dimensions: L: 65.4 in. W: 38.9 in
- Seat height: 26.8 in.
- Weight: 276 lbs. (dry)
- Fuel capacity: 2.2 gal
- Oil capacity: 1.4 qt

The second generation ATC125M (The Vertical ATC125M) was completely redesigned, featuring a 124cc vertical engine attached to a 5-speed auto clutch transmission with reverse, and electric start. The machine offered a contemporary look, taking inspiration from the popular ATC200 line. This included adding a front drum brake to the machine.
