= All-terrain vehicle =

Light off-road vehicle

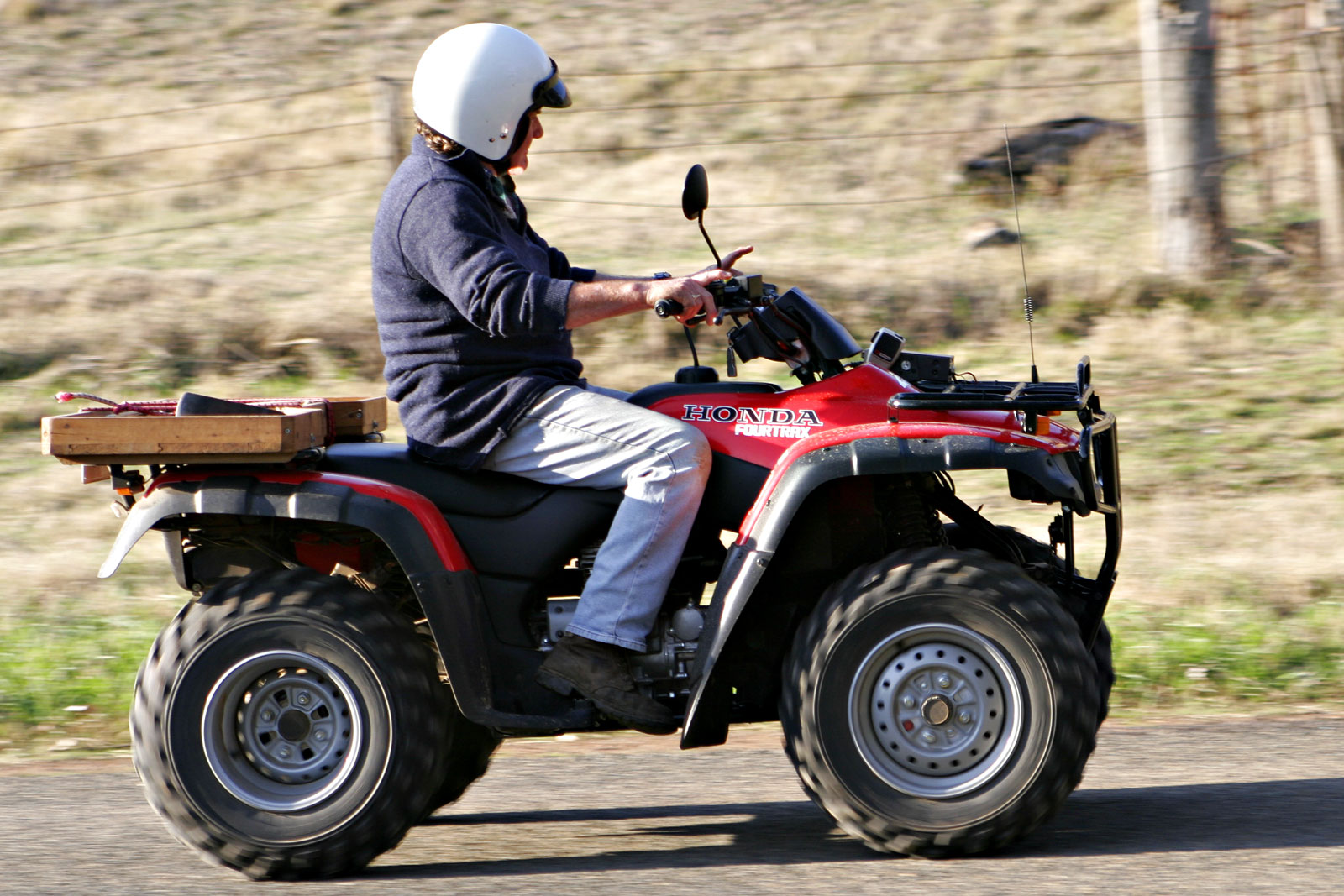
The ATV is commonly called a four-wheeler in Australia, South Africa, parts of Canada, India, and the United States. They are used extensively in agriculture, because of their speed and light footprint.

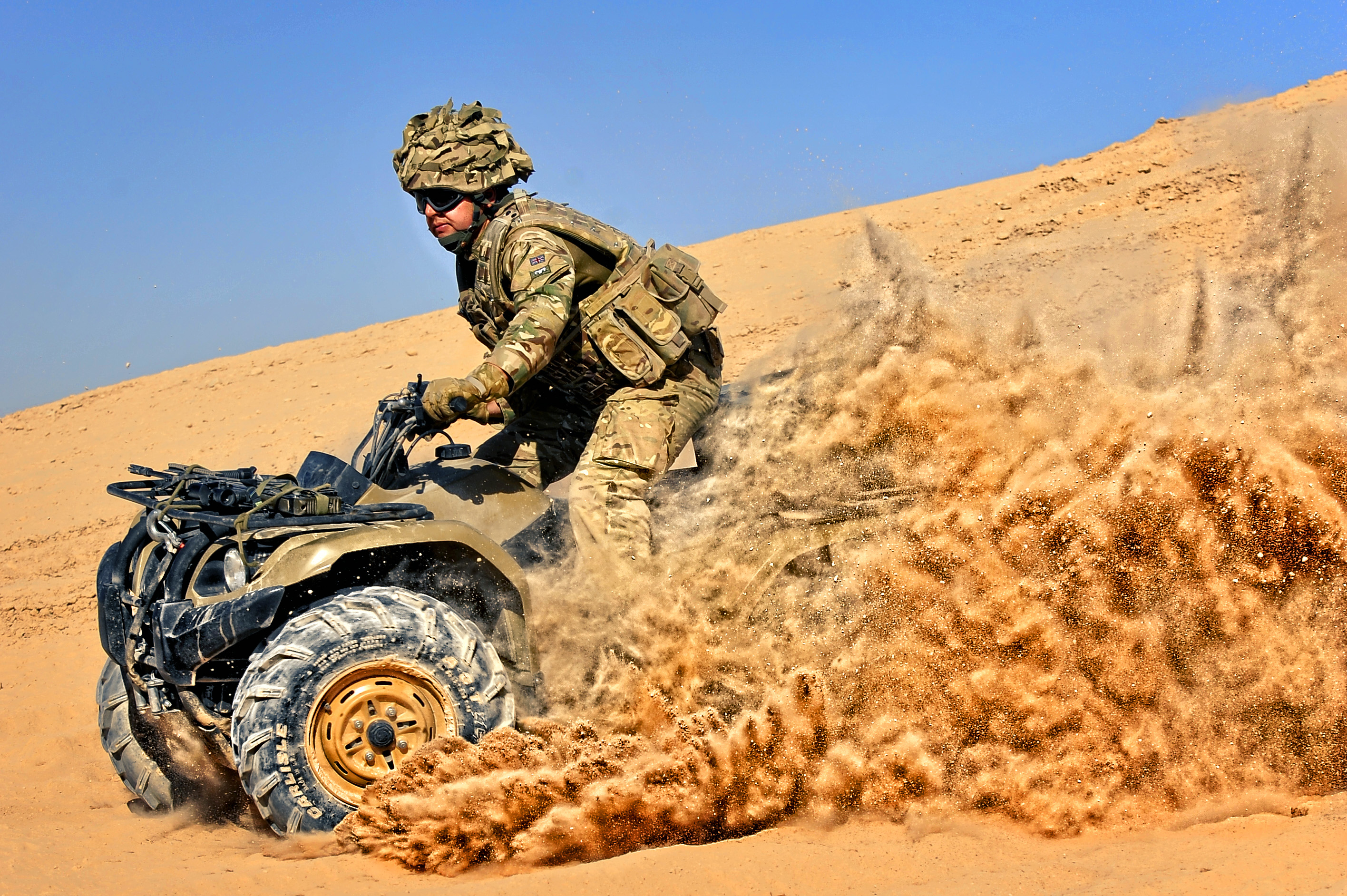
ATVs are also used for military purposes. (Yamaha Grizzly)

An all-terrain vehicle (ATV), also known as a light utility vehicle (LUV), a quad bike or quad (if it has four wheels), as defined by the American National Standards Institute (ANSI), is a vehicle that travels on low-pressure tires, has a seat that is straddled by the operator, and has handlebars, similar to a motorcycle. As the name implies, it is designed to handle a wider variety of terrain than most other vehicles. It is street-legal in some countries, but not in most states, territories and provinces of Australia, the United States, and Canada.

By the current ANSI definition, ATVs are intended for use by a single operator, but some ATVs, referred to as tandem ATVs, have been developed for use by the driver and one passenger.

The rider sits on and operates these vehicles like a motorcycle, but the extra wheels give more stability at slower speeds. Although most are equipped with three or four wheels, six or eight wheel (tracked) models exist and have existed historically for specialized applications. Multiple-user analogues with side-by-side seating are called utility terrain vehicles (UTVs) or side-by-sides to distinguish the classes of vehicle. Both classes tend to have similar powertrain parts. Engine sizes of ATVs for sale in the United States as of 2008 ranged from 49 to 1,000 cc (3.0 to 61 cu in).

== History ==
=== 19th century ===
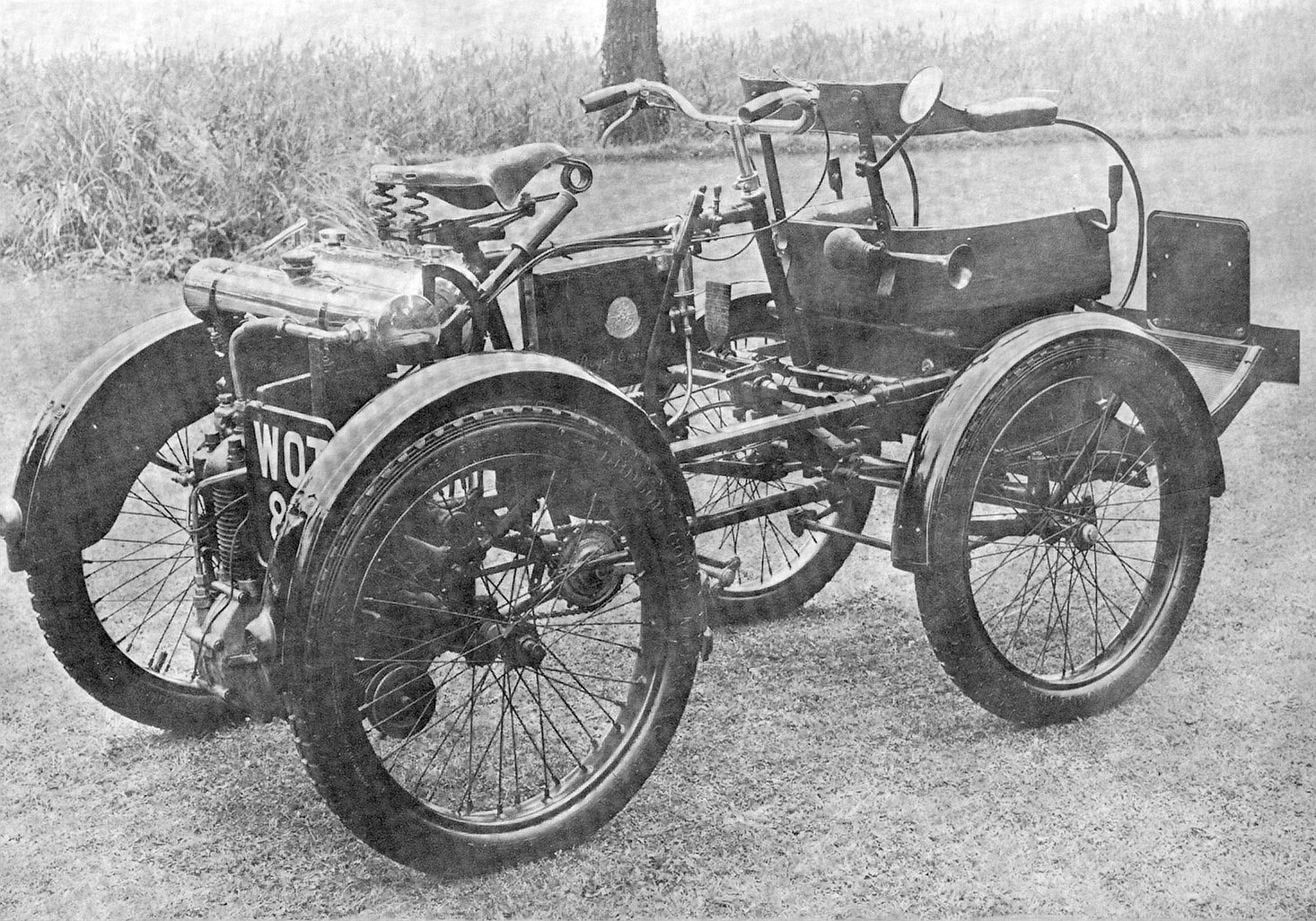
An 1898 Royal Enfield quadricycle.

Royal Enfield built and sold the first powered four-wheeler in 1893. It had many bicycle components, including handlebars. The Royal Enfield resembles a modern ATV-style quad bike but was designed as a form of horseless carriage for road use.

=== Six-wheeled AATVs ===
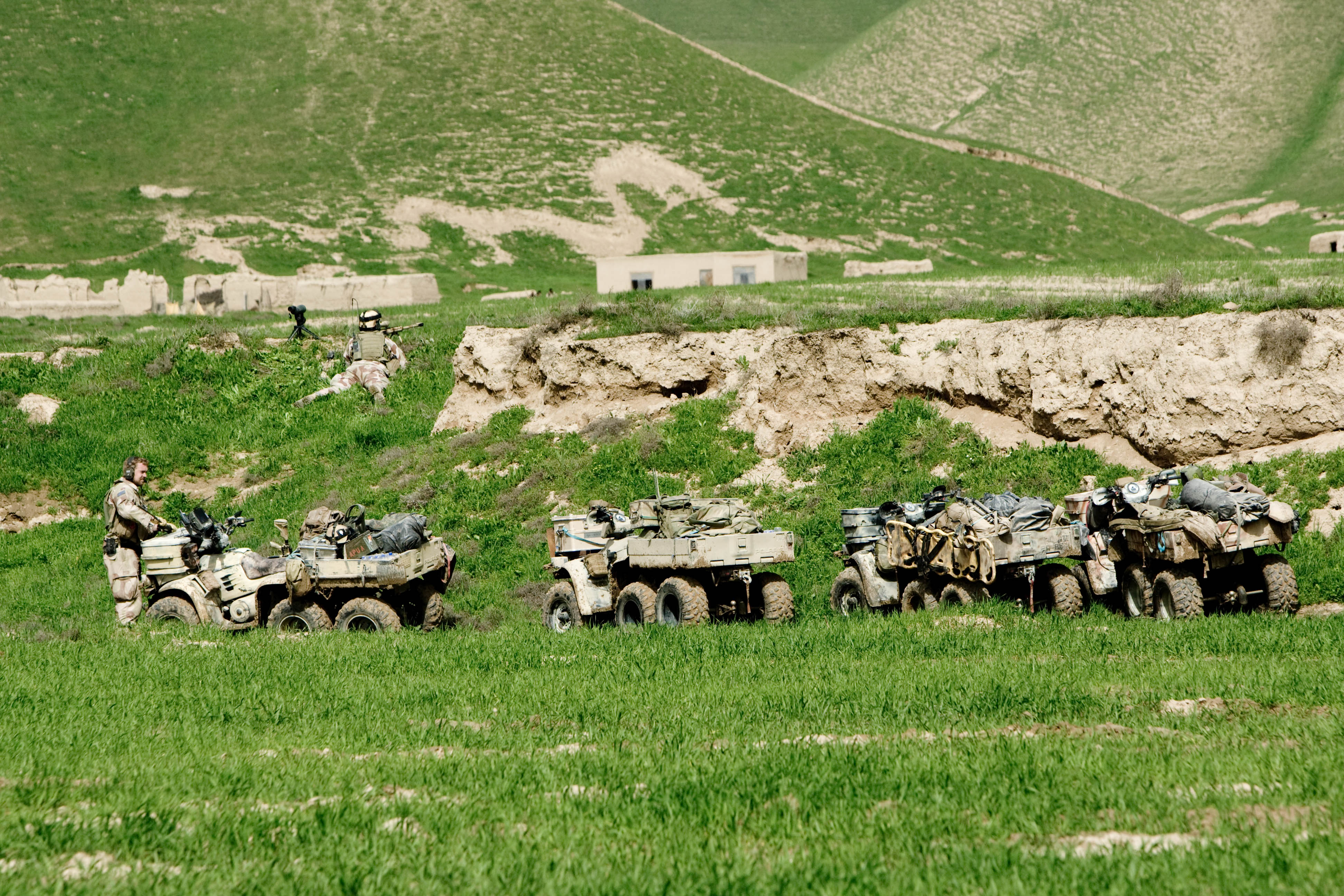
Four 6x6 Polaris Big Bosses in use by members of the Norwegian Telemark Battalion during the War in Afghanistan.

The term "ATV" was originally coined to refer to non-straddle ridden, typically six-wheeled, amphibious ATVs, such as the Jiger produced by the Jiger Corporation, the Amphicat produced by Mobility Unlimited Inc, and the Terra Tiger produced by the Allis-Chalmers Manufacturing Company in the mid-1960s and early 1970s. With the introduction of straddle ridden ATVs, the term AATV was introduced to define the original amphibious ATV category.

=== Three-wheeled ATVs ===
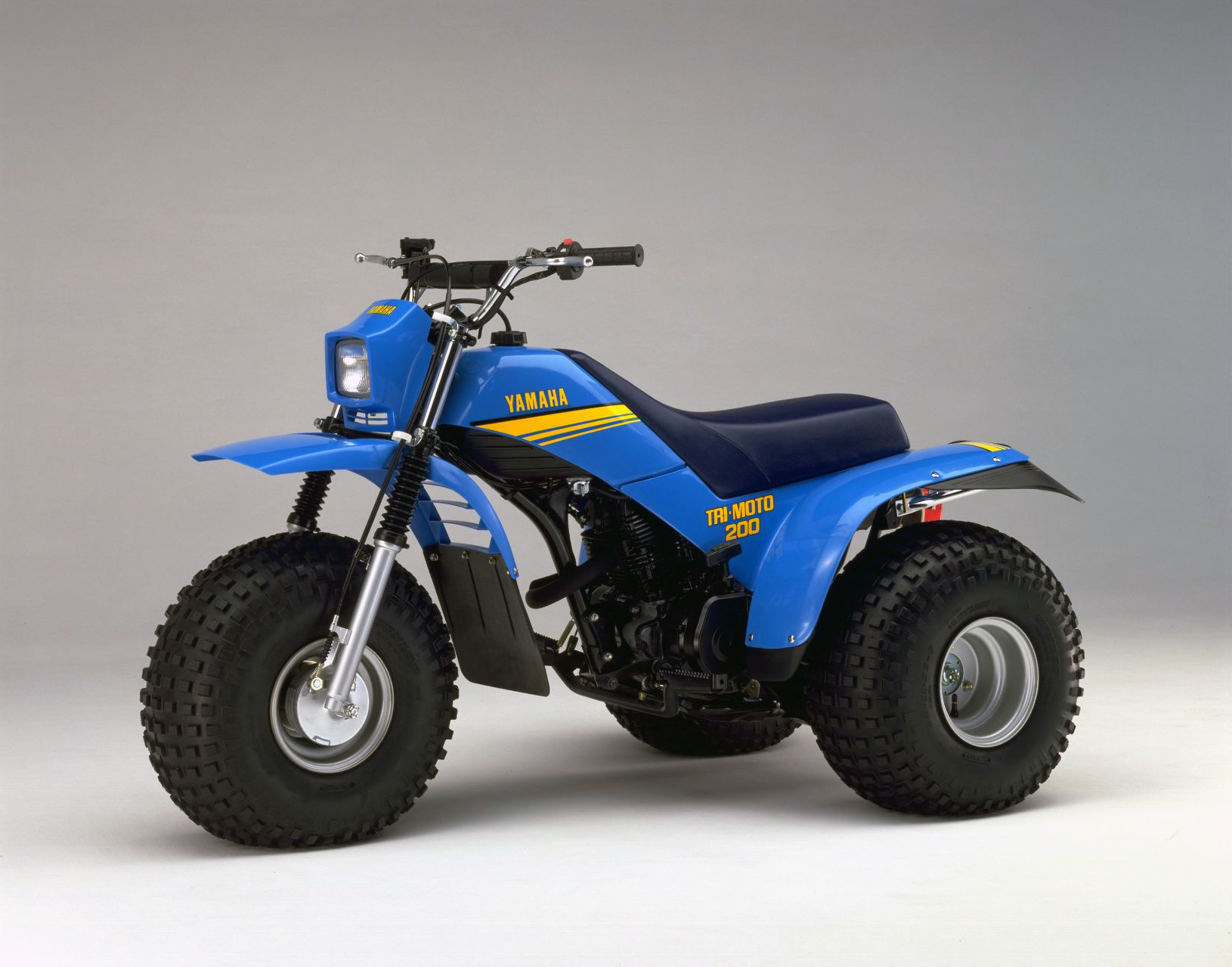
1979 Yamaha TRI-MOTO, one of the many three-wheeled models made by Yamaha and other manufacturers

The first three-wheeled ATV was the Sperry-Rand Tricart. It was designed in 1967 as a graduate project of John Plessinger at the Cranbrook Academy of Arts near Detroit. The Tricart was straddle-ridden with a sit-in rather than sit-on style (similar to the contemporaneous Big Wheel toy). In 1968 Plessinger sold the Tricart patents and design rights to Sperry-Rand New Holland who manufactured them commercially. Numerous small American manufacturers of 3-wheelers followed. These small manufacturers were unable to compete when larger motorcycle companies like Honda entered the market in 1969.

Honda introduced their first sit-on straddle-ridden three-wheeled all-terrain vehicle in 1969, known as a US90, as a 1970 Model. Variations would be popularized in the James Bond movie, Diamonds Are Forever and TV shows such as Doctor Who, Magnum, P.I. and Hart to Hart. In 1973, Honda trademarked the term "All Terrain Cycle" (ATC), applying it to all Honda's three-wheeled ATVs; it became a universal name associated with all vehicles of this type. It was directly influenced by earlier 6-wheeled AATVs of the sixties, and utilized balloon tires for both a low environmental impact and to compensate for a lack of mechanical suspension.

Honda entered the 1980s with a virtual monopoly in the market, due to effective patents on design and engine placement. By 1980, other companies paid patent royalties to Honda to enter the lucrative ATC field with their own machines. Yamaha introduced their first ATC, the Tri-Moto YZ125. Kawasaki followed suit the next year with the KLT200, while Suzuki produced their first model, the ALT125, in 1982. As the popularity of ATCs increased dramatically, rapid development ensued. The ability to go anywhere on terrain that most other vehicles could not cross soon made them popular with US and Canadian hunters. As other manufacturers were entering the market, Honda was diversifying, offering the ATC250R, the first Sport ATC intended for competition, in 1981. The 1982 Honda ATC200E Big Red was a landmark model. It featured both suspension and racks, making it the first ATC designed specifically for utility, and would become the world's best-selling ATC. Honda followed that effort in 1983 with the ATC200X, an easy-to-handle 192 cc (0.192 L; 11.7 cu in) four-stroke Sport ATC that was ideal for new riders.

Not to be outdone, Kawasaki and Yamaha responded with their own Sport ATCs. 1984 saw the release of the Kawasaki KXT250 Tecate, and Yamaha followed in 1985 with the Tri-Z 250. Both were liquid cooled 250 cc two-strokes capable of giving the Honda ATC250R competition. In response to growing market, American Specialty manufacturer Tiger also introduced a series of ATCs, hand-built-to-order models that included the Tiger 500, the largest displacement ATC produced commercially. While Kawasaki and Yamaha both produced utility ATCs, famously making the KLT 250 Police and Yamahauler respectively, Suzuki turned their attention to building Sport Quads.

Honda continued to diversify their line-up (at peak offering 10 distinct models), releasing the larger, fully suspended 250 cc Big Red utility ATC, and introduced the 350X Sport ATC, their largest displacement machine, in 1985. But the bulk of their sales were the 200cc line, offering six models and selling over 500,000 units in 3 years. Honda's response to the Tecate and Tri-Z, the liquid cooled 1985 and 1986 ATC250R, remains one of the most desirable ATCs of the era, and aftermarket support still follows the machine.

==== U.S. manufacturers ====
Main articles: Tiger ATV LTD and Polaris Scrambler 250R/es

American-based manufacturers also produced ATCs in this period, albeit in small numbers. Polaris offered the Scrambler in 1985 and 1986, producing appx 1600 units. Speciality manufacturer Tiger ATV also produced a range of ATCs, but their liquidation in 1991 left no official record of how many units were produced. The collector ATV market estimates vary drastically, from 300 to as many as 1000 units total production. Tiger ATCs were offered for three years, with models using 80 to 500 cc (0.0800 to 0.500 L; 4.88 to 30.5 cu in) two-stroke engines provided by KTM and Rotax.

The Tiger 500 is notable for being the fastest consumer ATC available, with tested top speeds of +80 mph from the stock 42 horsepower (31.3 kW)@6500rpm engine and 5 speed gearbox. With final drive gearing changes, the ATC could exceed 100 mph. However, due to the rarity of the machines the brand never became well-known, and as all Tiger Models were custom-ordered and built to the buyer's specifications for the purpose of factory ATV racing, Polaris is generally known as the first American 'Production' ATV producer.

==== Production pause ====
Production of three-wheelers was voluntarily ceased by all manufacturers by 1987, in light of safety concerns, and ahead of any legislation. Though later studies showed that three-wheelers were not considered more unstable than four-wheelers (although accidents are equally severe in both classes), manufacturers agreed to a 10-year moratorium on production, and to collectively financing a +US$100 million ATV safety campaign. Despite the moratorium lifting, manufacturers did not return to the ATC market, focusing instead on four-wheeled ATVs. A ban on sales of new or used three-wheelers and a recall of all remaining three-wheelers was proposed by the American Academy of Pediatrics.

These safety issues with three-wheel ATCs caused a shift in the buying public, as the sales of later four-wheel ATV models grew rapidly. While three-wheel models ended production in 1987, agreements between the major manufacturers and the US U.S. Consumer Product Safety Commission to officially cease production and finance safety campaigns moved forward. While the lighter weight of ATCs made them popular with certain riders, manufacturers continued to focus on ATV production.

==== US Public Law 110-314 ====
US Public Law 110-314, enacted on 8 August 2008, separated ATCs from existing new production ATV safety standards, and requires new standards for three-wheeled ATCs to be drafted. This effectively suspended importation of three-wheeled ATCs, until new standards of safety can be drafted. As of 2020, such standards have not been drafted. While search engines can find informal information suggesting major Japanese manufacturers pressed for this measure due to an influx of inexpensive Chinese ATCs in the American market, no official documentation or cited sources support these claims. Currently, all manufacturers not based in the US are restricted from the manufacture and sale of new Three-Wheeled All Terrain Cycles, until safety standards can be implemented. Below is a summary of Section 232, which effects the ATC ban.

(Sec. 232) Requires the CPSC, notwithstanding any other provision of law, to establish as a mandatory consumer product safety standard a specified American National Standard for four-wheeled all-terrain vehicles developed by the Specialty Vehicle Institute of America. Makes it unlawful for any manufacturer or distributor to import or distribute any new all-terrain vehicle unless: (1) the vehicle complies with the standard, is subject to an all-terrain vehicle action plan, and bears a label certifying such compliance and certain other information; and (2) the manufacturer or distributor is in compliance with the action plan.

Prohibits the importation of new three-wheeled all-terrain vehicles until a mandatory consumer product safety standard applicable to three-wheeled all-terrain vehicles is in effect.

=== Four-wheeled ATVs (since 1980) ===
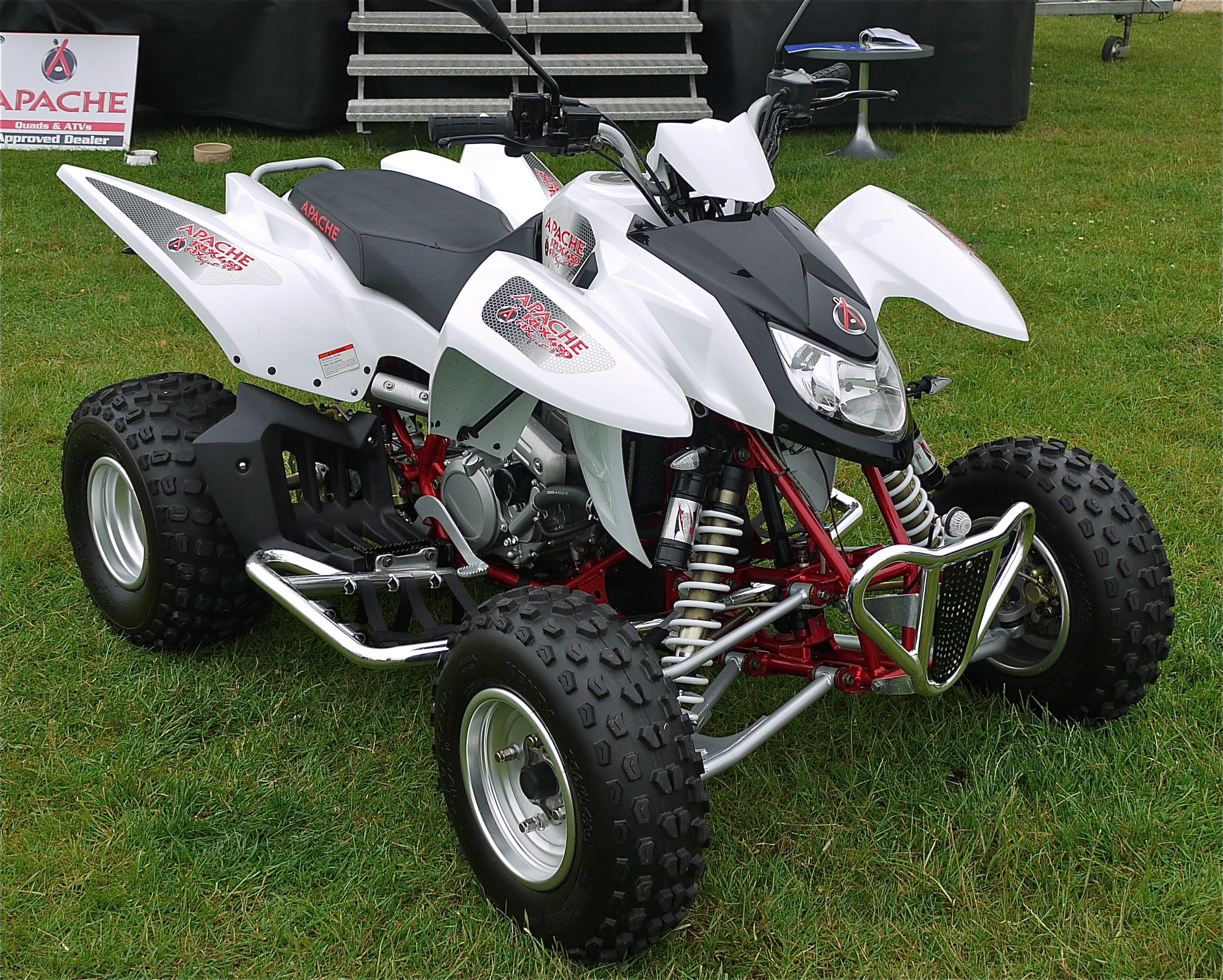
Apache Quad

Suzuki was a leader in the development of mass production four-wheeled ATVs. It sold the first model, the 1982 QuadRunner LT125, which was a recreational machine for beginners.

Adventure Vehicles of Monroe, Louisiana made the first quad ATV in 1980. They called it the Avenger 400. Prior to that, Adventure Vehicles made 3 wheel ATVs and a dump body utility 3 wheeler using Kohler 8 hp engines and Comet drive systems (Comet centrifugal belt-driven clutch, and a Comet forward, neutral, reverse transaxle, with a rigid rear axle or rear differential option.) The Avenger 400 was a rigid suspension vehicle with a fiberglass body and welded tube construction. It was a rudimentary vehicle reminiscent of the Tote Gote of the 1960s.

Suzuki sold the first four-wheeled mini ATV, the LT50, from 1984 to 1987. After the LT50, Suzuki sold the first ATV with a CVT transmission, the LT80, from 1987 to 2006.

In 1985 Suzuki introduced to the industry the first high-performance four-wheel ATV, the Suzuki LT250R QuadRacer. This machine was in production for the 1985–1992 model years. During its production run, it underwent three major engineering makeovers. However, the core features were retained. These were: a sophisticated long-travel suspension, a liquid-cooled, two-stroke motor, and a fully-manual five-speed transmission (for 1985–1986 models), and a six-speed transmission (for the '87–'92 models). It was a machine exclusively designed for racing by highly skilled riders.

Honda responded a year later with the FourTrax TRX250R—a machine that has not been replicated until recently. It currently remains a trophy winner and competitor to big-bore ATVs. Kawasaki responded with its Tecate-4 250. The TRX250R was very similar to the ATC250R it eventually replaced and is often considered one of the greatest sport ATVs ever built.

In 1987, Yamaha Motor Company introduced a different type of high-performance machine, the Banshee 350, which featured a twin-cylinder liquid-cooled two-stroke motor from the RD350LC street motorcycle. Heavier and more difficult to ride in the dirt than the 250s, the Banshee became a popular machine with sand dune riders thanks to its unique power delivery. The Banshee remains popular, but 2006 is the last year it was available in the U.S. (due to EPA emissions regulations); it remained available in Canada until 2008 and in Australia until 2012. The Warrior 350 was introduced in 1987 and went on for years as a light and fast ATV.

Shortly after the introduction of the Banshee in 1987, Suzuki released the LT500R QuadRacer. This unique quad was powered by a 500 cc liquid-cooled two-stroke engine with a five-speed transmission. This ATV earned the nickname "Quadzilla" with its remarkable amount of speed and size. While there are claims of 100+ mph (160 km/h) stock Quadzillas, it was officially recorded by 3&4 Wheel Action magazine as reaching a top speed of over 79 mph (127 km/h) in a high-speed shootout in its 1988 June issue, making it the fastest production four-wheeled ATV ever produced. Suzuki discontinued the production of the LT500R in 1990 after just four years.

At the same time, the development of utility ATVs was rapidly escalating. The 1986 Honda FourTrax TRX350 4x4 ushered in the era of four-wheel-drive ATVs. Other manufacturers quickly followed suit, and 4x4s have remained the most popular type of ATV ever since. These machines are popular with hunters, farmers, ranchers, and workers at construction sites.

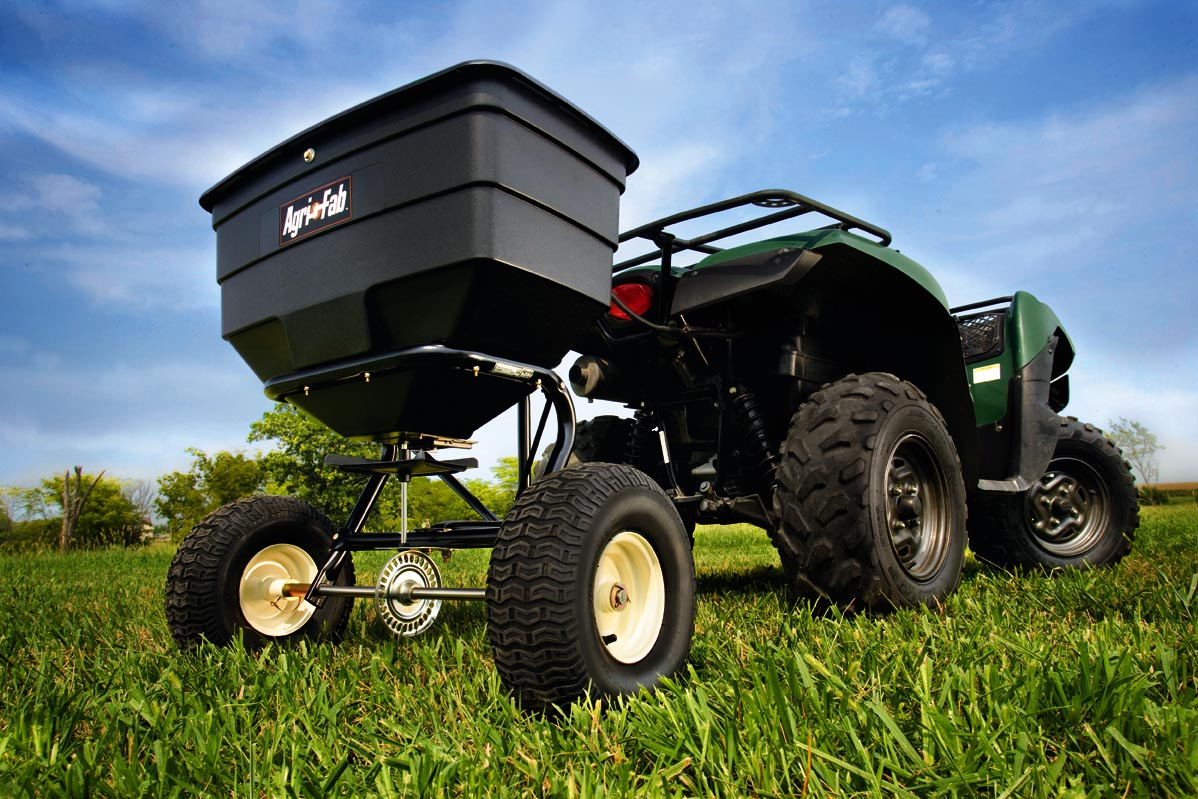
ATV with a tow spreader mounted

Models are divided into the sport and utility markets. Sport models are generally small, light, two-wheel-drive vehicles that accelerate quickly, have a manual transmission, and run at speeds up to approximately 80 mph (130 km/h). Utility models are generally bigger four-wheel-drive vehicles with a maximum speed of up to approximately 70 mph (110 km/h). They can haul small loads on attached racks or small dump beds, and tow small trailers. Due to the different weights, each has advantages on different types of terrain. A popular model is Yamaha's Raptor 700, which has a nearly 700 cc four-stroke engine.

Six-wheel models often have a small dump bed, with an extra set of wheels at the back to increase the payload capacity. They can be either four-wheel-drive (back wheels driving only), or six-wheel-drive.

In 2011 LandFighter was founded, "the first Dutch/European ATV brand". Most production is in Taiwan, to European standards; the ATVs are finally assembled in the Netherlands.

== Safety and legal regulation ==
Safety helmets, mandatory in some jurisdictions, provide the rider with some protection in the case of an accident.

=== Three-wheel vehicles ===
Safety courses and educational literature reduced the number and severity of accidents among ATC and ATV riders. As cornering is more challenging on a three-wheel ATC than with a four-wheeled machine, properly leaning into the turn is required to counterbalance the weight and keep the machine stable. Careless operators may roll over at high speeds. The lighter front-end and smaller footprint of ATCs present both a flipping and steering hazard under acceleration and on inclines. Lateral rollovers may also occur when traversing steep inclines. ATCs require unique techniques to ride properly, and turning lean requires more exaggeration than ATVs; Throttle steering is another technique commonly used on ATCs in soft terrain and at high speeds, leaning to the inside of the turn and manipulating the throttle to break traction with the rear tires, resulting in the machines turning on axis while maintaining a forward direction.

=== Four-wheel vehicles ===
Four-wheel quad cycles have a tendency to roll over, often injuring or killing the rider. Suitably designed roll bars can be fitted, which do not prevent the cycle from overturning, but prop it up, providing some protection for the rider.

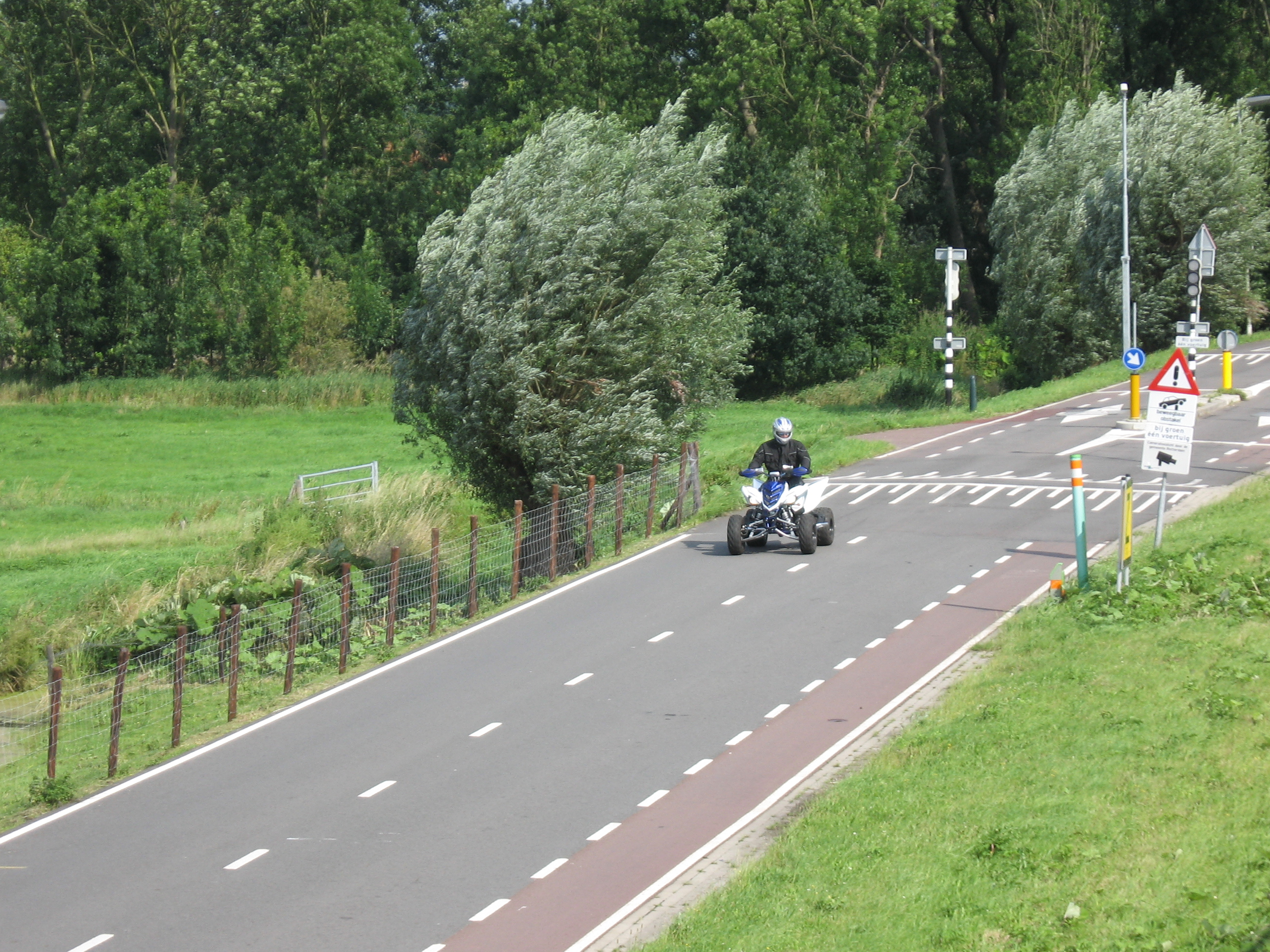
Driving an ATV on a paved road in the Netherlands

=== Studies and protective equipment ===
Safety has been a major issue with ATVs due to the many deaths and injuries associated with them and the lack of protection due to the absence of a rigid cab.

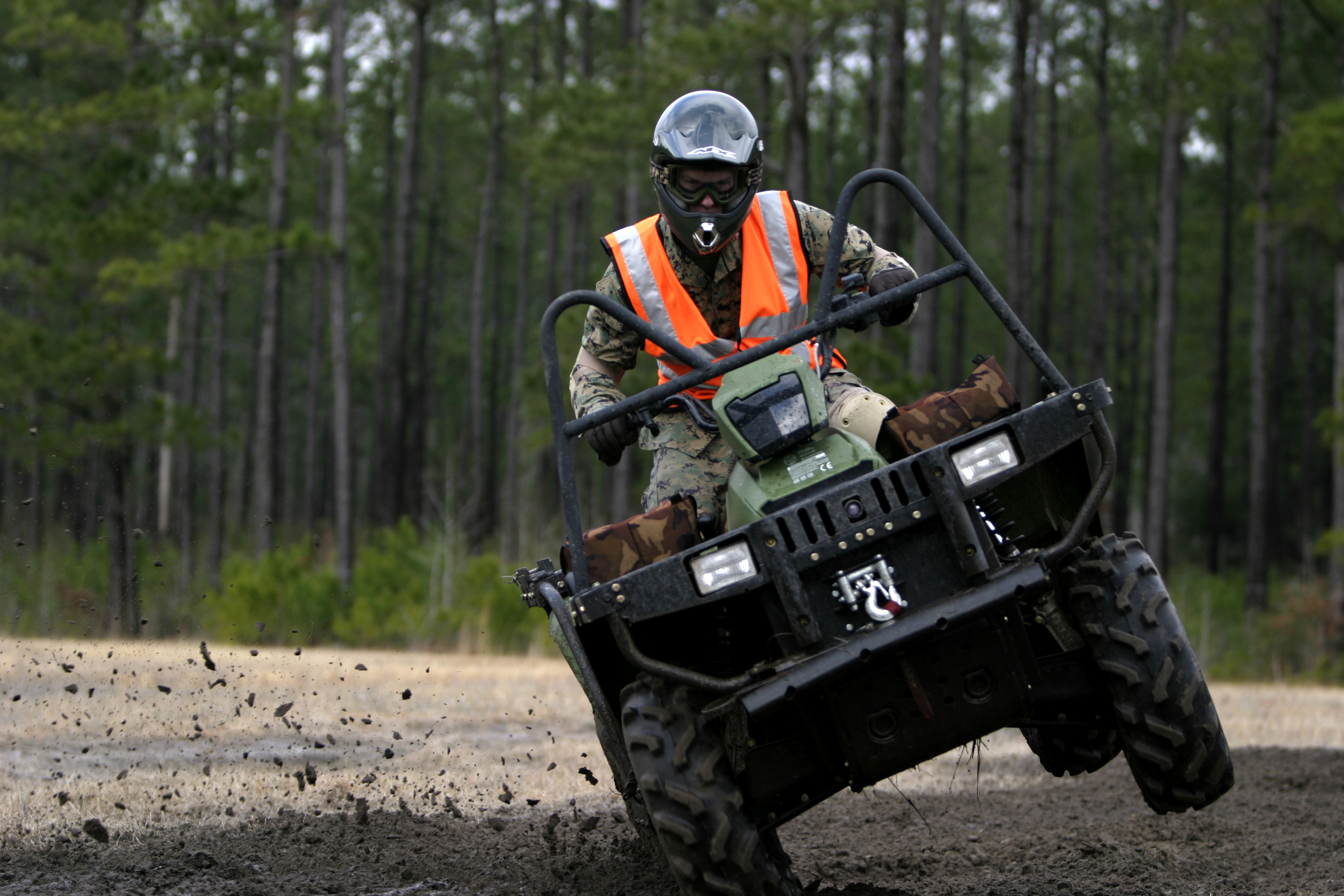
Roll-over protection fitted 4x4 used by the US Marines Special Operations.

Modern ATVs were introduced in the early 1970s, with almost immediate alarming injury rates for children and adolescents. Based on analysis of the National Trauma Data Bank, ATVs are more dangerous than dirt bikes, possibly due to crush injuries and failure to wear safety gear such as helmets. They are as dangerous as motorcycles, based on mortality and injury scores. More children and women, who are less likely to wear helmets, are injured on ATVs.

Many common injuries can be prevented with the use of proper protective equipment. Most ATV manufacturers recommend at least a suitable DOT-approved helmet, protective eyewear, gloves and suitable riding boots for all riding conditions. Sport or aggressive riders, or riders on challenging terrain (such as those rock crawling or hillclimbing), may opt for a motocross-style chest protector and knee/shin guards for further protection. Use of tires suited to a particular terrain can also play a vital role in preventing injuries. Fatal accidents typically occur when the vehicle rolls over. Wearing a helmet can reduce the risk of death by 42% and the risk of nonfatal head injury by 64%.

=== United States ===
In the United States, statistics released by the Consumer Product Safety Commission (CPSC) show that in 2016–2020, an estimated 526,900 emergency department treated injuries were associated with off-highway vehicles (an annual average of 105,400), and up to half of these injuries involved children and youth under age 25. From 2016 to 2018, 1591 people died in ATV-associated incidents, with 28% involving children and youth under age 25. Focus has shifted to machine size balanced with the usage of ATVs categorized by age ranges and engine displacements—in line with the consent decrees. ATVs are mandated to bear a label from the manufacturer stating that the use of machines greater than 90 cc by riders under the age of 12 is prohibited. This is a 'manufacturer/CPSC recommendation' and not necessarily state law. Although youth-sized ATVs are designed and available for younger riders, there are serious concerns regarding their appropriateness and safety for youth.

The American Academy of Pediatrics and the CPSC recommended that children under the age of 16 should not ride ATVs. In the United States, about 40,000 children under age 16 are treated in emergency departments for ATV-related injuries each year. A Canadian study stated that "associated injury patterns, severity, and costs to the healthcare system" of pediatric injuries associated to ATVs resemble those caused by motor vehicles, and that public policies should reflect this. Helmets are underutilized and result in Glasgow Coma Scale scores in children presenting from ATV accidents being similar to those in motorcycle accidents.

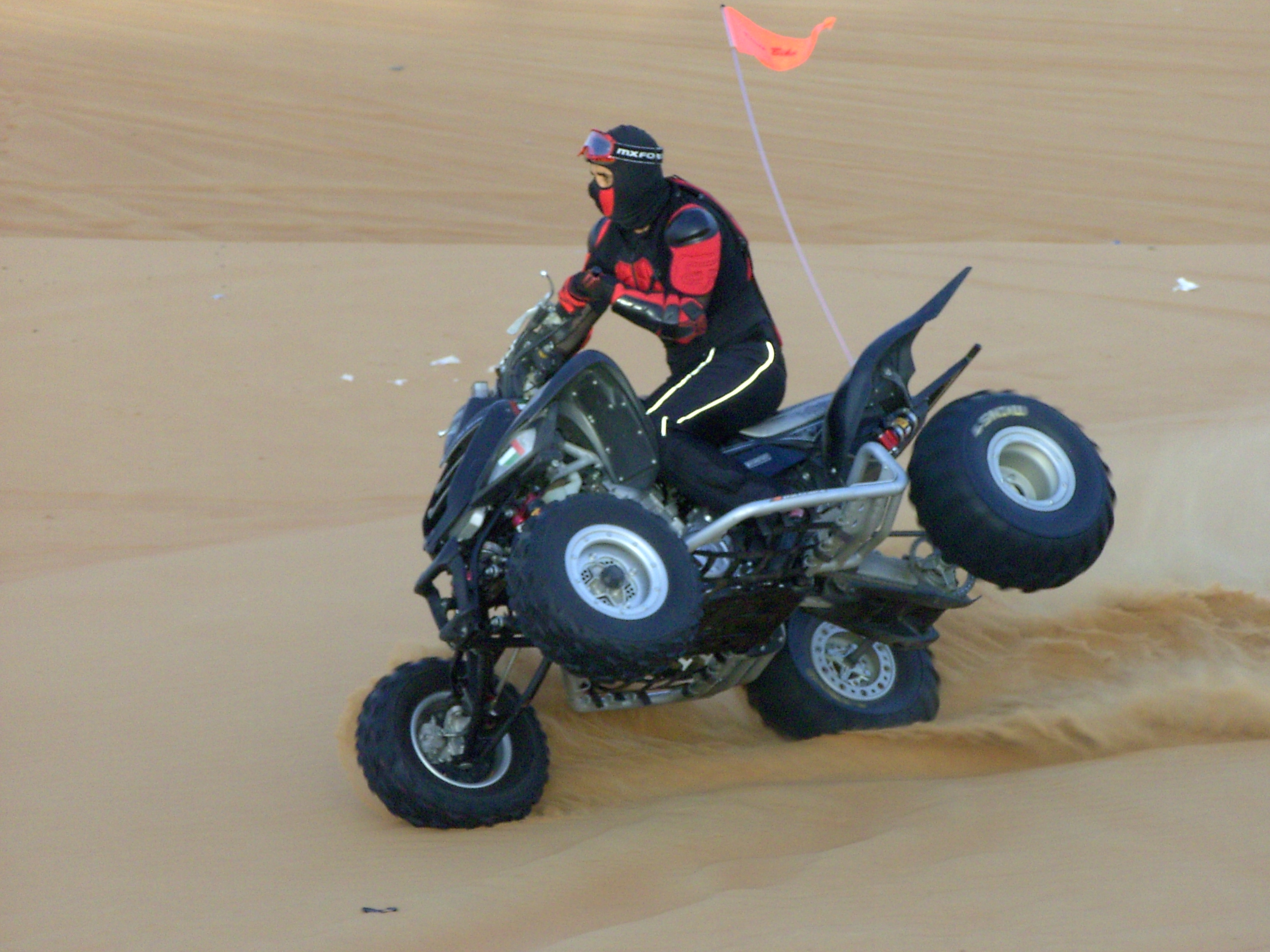
Quad bike two-wheel trick-riding on sand dune.

The Consumer Product Safety Commission met in March 2005 to discuss the dangers of ATVs. Data from 2004 showed 44,000 injuries and almost 150 fatalities in children while riding ATVs. In response to calls for further regulation, the CPSC's director of compliance, John Gibson Mullan, said that because the statistics were not rising, existing measures were working. The New York Times reported an accusation from a staff member that Mullan, who had previously worked as a lawyer for the ATV industry, had distorted the statistics and prevented further debate.

The United States government maintains a website about the safety of ATVs where safety tips are provided, such as not driving ATVs with a passenger (passengers make it difficult or impossible for the driver to shift their weight, as required to drive an ATV) or not driving ATVs on paved roads (ATVs usually have a solid rear axle with no differential).

In 1988, the All-terrain Vehicle Safety Institute (ASI) was formed to provide training and education for ATV riders. The cost of attending the training is minimal and is free for purchasers of new machines that fall within the correct age and size guidelines. Successful completion of a safety training class is, in many states, a minimum requirement for minors to be granted permission to ride on public land. Some states have had to implement their own safety training programs, as the ASI program cannot include those riders with ATVs outside of the age and size guidelines, which may still fall within the states' laws.

From 1 January 2019, the United States Consumer Product Safety Commission updated ATV lighting requirements, requiring all categories of ATVs to be equipped with a stop lamp and side reflectors similar to those required on passenger cars.

In industry, agriculture workers are disproportionately at risk for ATV accidents. Most fatalities occur in white men over the age of 55.

==== Street legality ====
ATV's have the ability to be officially street legal and can be used on at least certain roads in 21 states, requirements vary by state however.

=== United Kingdom ===
A "quad" is recognised by UK law as a vehicle with four wheels and a mass of less than 550 kg (1,210 lb). A quad cycle to be used on a public road in the UK must be taxed, insured and registered, and the driver must have a category B (car) or B1 (motor vehicles with 4 wheels up to 400 kg unladen or 550 kg if designed for carrying goods) licence. In the United Kingdom, the safety issues of cars classed as quad cycles are illustrated by the case of the G-Wiz (REVAi). The electric microcar was given a Euro NCAP specification test, and the results showed that the vehicle's occupants would suffer "serious or life-threatening" injuries in a 64 km/h (40 mph) crash. The UK Department for Transport concluded that there were serious safety concerns when the REVA was crashed at 35 mph (56 km/h).

=== Australia ===
After consultation with stakeholders including farmers and quad cycle manufacturers, Australia's Heads of Workplace Safety Authorities (HWSA) in 2011 released a strategy intended to reduce the number of deaths and serious injuries associated with quad-bike use. The development of the report was closely followed by The Weekly Times newspaper and ABC television which reviewed the issue through its 7.30 program. Apart from encouraging of standard safety measures such as helmet-wearing, the strategy also recommend development of a national training curriculum, point of sale material for purchasers and, controversially, a recommendation that owners consider fitting an after-market anti-crush device which may offer added protection in the event of a roll-over.

When the report was released the only model of anti-crush protection on the market was the Australian-made "Quadbar", which was vigorously opposed by the industry through media activity and a poster campaign at regional events for farmers which are often used to showcase new products. The industry argued that the device had not been properly tested and that past studies of tractor-style ROPS such as a full-frame 'cage' around the operator were not only ineffective, but could add to the risk to injury or death.

In February 2012, the Melbourne-based Institute for Safety, Compensation and Recovery Research (ISCRR) published a paper which criticised the research claims of the manufacturers in relation to crush protection devices. The paper reviewed research in a number of countries since 1993 in relation to rollover protection and found that the industry's opposition to rollover protection could not be supported because of limitations in past research. It recommended further research on the topic and the development of research tools based on the use of ATV/quadbikes in Australian conditions.

=== Canada ===
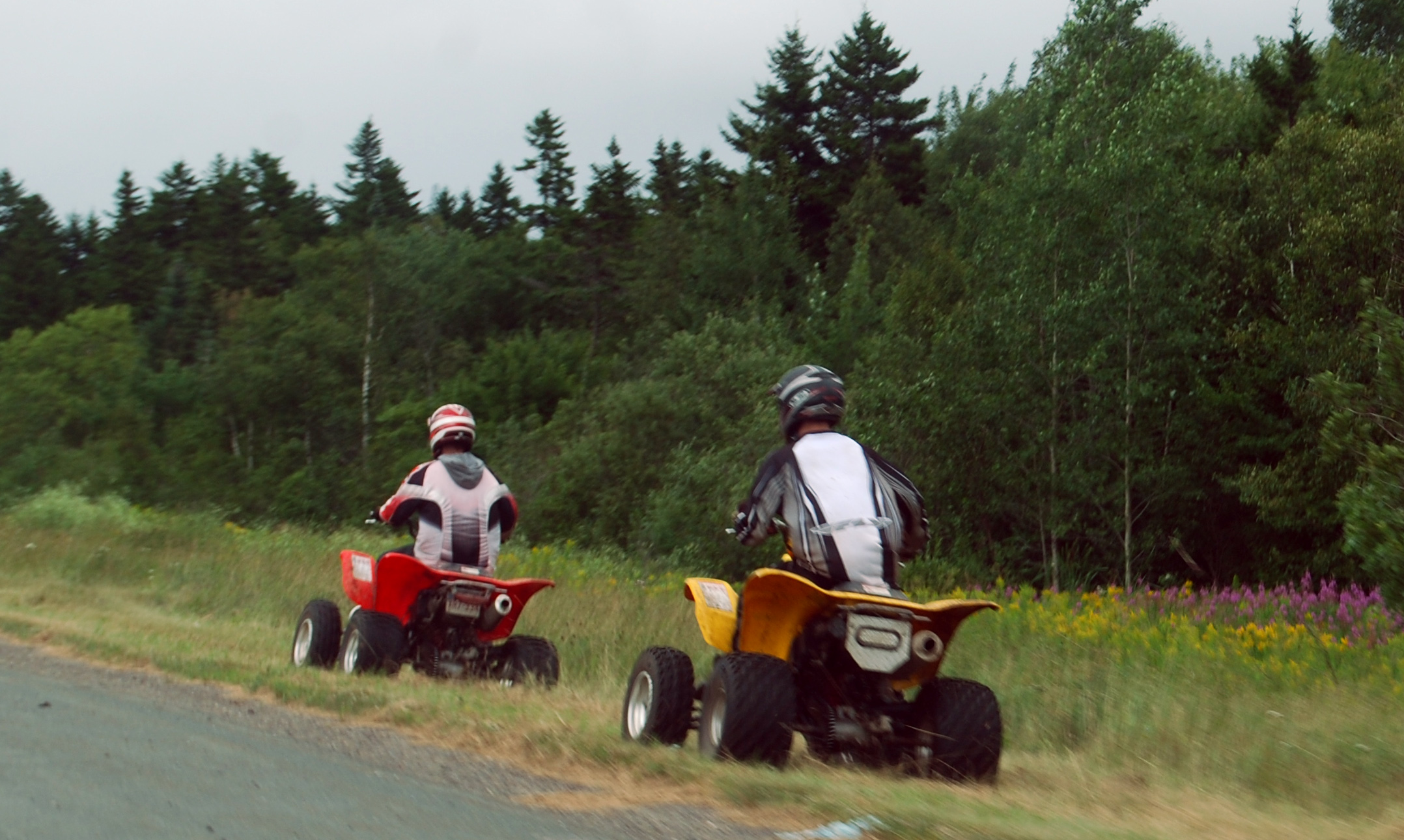
ATVs in New Brunswick, Canada. Note that one of them is plated, an obligation in New Brunswick to legally cross and roll on roads for a maximum of a few hundred meters.

In most provinces, ATV users are required to register their vehicle and have a designated off-highway license plate. Some provinces, like Nova Scotia, recently moved to allow ATVs limited road shoulder usage for the purpose of travelling from one trailhead to another.

=== Germany ===
In Germany the legal situation is very unrestrictive, but complex.

==== Street legality and registration ====
Almost, if not any manufacturer ATV registered at the KBA (Kraftfahrtbundesamt) can be registered for road use in Germany. Vehicle-taxes, insurance and a number plate as well as a MOT (TÜV) are required.

Quads can be accredited in two different ways in Germany. Usually they are taxed and insured as a regular automobile, which results in the tax being calculated by emissions and displacement in 100ccm steps. ATVs registered as an automobile have to be restricted to a power output of 20 hp/15 kW and are allowed to be driven with a passenger, provided a passenger seat is registered in the vehicle papers.

The quad must have at least one rear mirror on the left side, minimum 10x5cm. Right side mirror is optional.

The vehicle must have a high-/low-beam headlight, brake light, indicators, a number plate mount on front and back, and a horn.

ATVs under 400 kilograms (880 lb) do not need a reverse gear. Over 400 kilograms (880 lb) empty weight, a reverse gear and reverse light are required.

The maximum engine noise restrictions depend on date of first registration and engine displacement.

On the other hand, ATVs can be registered "as agricultural and silvicultural" (LoF/Land- oder Forstwirtschaftlich) giving the owner some benefits: The quad can be driven with power outputs more than 20 hp and tax is much cheaper, being calculated by empty weight. The insurance cost is much lower than for other agricultural vehicles and ATVs,.

However, there are some restrictions and requirements for registering ATVS as an agricultural vehicle:

- the ATV may never be driven with a passenger, even if a passenger seat is available.
- in addition to the street registration requirements, it needs:
  - additional hazard flashers
  - a rear fog light
  - a minimum of 2 headlights
  - a trailer coupling including electric kit for trailer lighting.
  - a reverse gear, even under 400 kg empty weight

==== Customization ====
Custom builds and engine replacements are possible to get street legal, by undergoing a single-acceptance procedure from the MOT(TÜV). This results in some custom quads popularly sporting 4-cycle motorcycle engines street legal. A common example are Yamaha Raptor 700 Conversions to a Yamaha 1000 cc engine from the early Yamaha Fazer and R1.

==== Driving license ====
ATVS are mostly treated as a regular automobile in Germany, which means no special-vehicle or motorcycle licence is needed. The regular driving license class B (multiple track motorised vehicles up to 3.5 tons) is sufficient even for LoF registered vehicles. Consequently, until 2013, quads could be driven only by people at least 18 years old with a drivers license. People under 18 may have a 50 cc or 125 cc bike license, but this does not allow them to drive quad bikes.

In 2013 the class AM licence was introduced, allowing 16-year-olds to drive microcars that do not exceed a speed of 50 km/h (such as the Ellenator); this permits the use of an ATV limited to 50 cc with a top speed not exceeding 45 km/h.

==== Special restrictions ====
As quad bikes were treated as automobiles, wearing a helmet was not required until January 2006, when helmets became required for ATVs, three-wheelers, trikes, etc. No additional protective gear is required.

Officially, driving a quad requires the owner to always carry a hazard triangle and a first-aid kit, and a reflective vest if the quad is registered as an agricultural vehicle. Due to the lack of storage room, police usually don't check the back of the vehicle, but if they lack the required equipment, they may be prosecuted.

== Environmental issues ==
=== Emissions ===
ATVs accounted for 58% of the SI (spark ignited) recreational vehicles in the US in the year 2000. That year, recreational SI vehicles produced 0.16% of NOx, 8% of HC, 5% of CO and 0.8% of PM emissions for all vehicles, both highway and nonroad. As a point of comparison, the nonroad SI < 19 kW (~25 hp) category (small spark ignition engines such as lawnmowers) comprised 20% of HC and 23% of CO total emissions. While recreational SI vehicles produce an aggregate of <4% of all HC emissions in the US, based on the relatively small population of ATVs (<1.2M) and small annual usage (<350 hrs), EPA emission regulations now include such engines, starting with the model year 2006. Engines meeting these standards now produce only 3% of the HC emissions that previously unregulated engines did.

=== Terrain damage ===
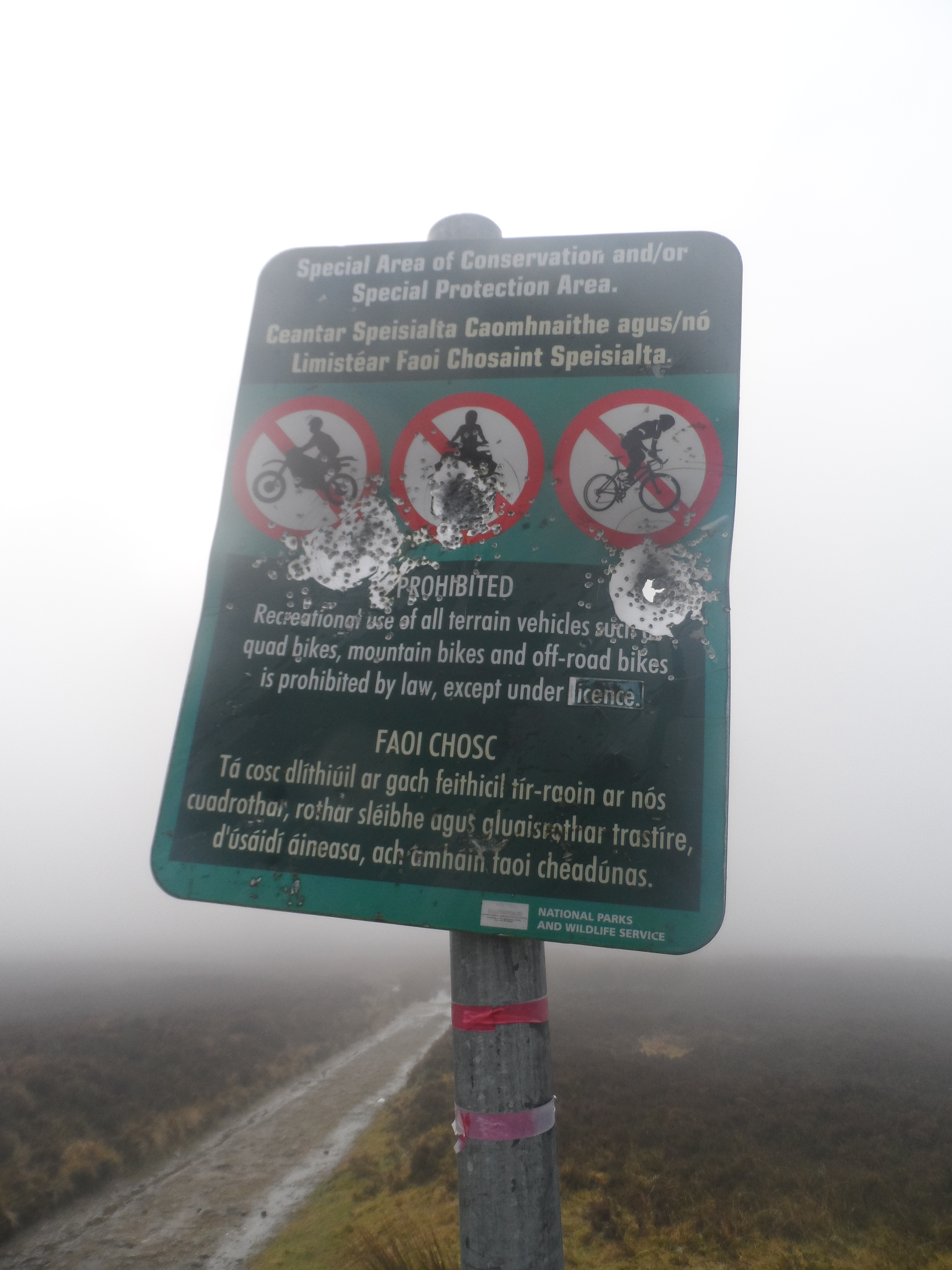
Plinked sign in a Special Areas of Conservation in Ireland, indicating that ATVs are forbidden.

While the deep treads on some ATV tires are effective for navigating rocky, muddy and root covered terrain, these treads are also capable of digging channels that may drain bogs, increase sedimentation in streams at crossings and damage groomed snowmobile trails. Proper trail construction techniques can mitigate these effects.

In some countries where fencing is not common, such as the US, Canada and Australia, some ATV riders knowingly cross privately owned property in rural areas and travel over public or private properties, although only permitted on trails. Subsequently, environmentalists criticize ATV riding as a sport for excessive use in areas which biologists consider to be sensitive, especially wetlands and sand dunes and in much of inland Australia.

Because both scientific studies and U.S. National Forest Service personnel have identified unregulated Off-Road Vehicles (ORVs) as the source of major detrimental impacts on national forests, the U.S. Forest Service is currently engaged in the Travel Management Process, wherein individual forests are restricting all off-road motorized travel to approved trails and roads. This is in contrast to its previously allowed, unregulated cross-country travel across all national forest lands, except for specifically designated wilderness areas. Although ORVs had been identified 30 years ago as a threat to wild ecosystems by the Forest Service, only after pressure by an unlikely alliance of environmentalists, private landowners, hunters, ranchers, fishermen, quiet recreationists and forest rangers themselves (who identified ORVs as a "significant law enforcement problem" in national forests).

== Other uses ==
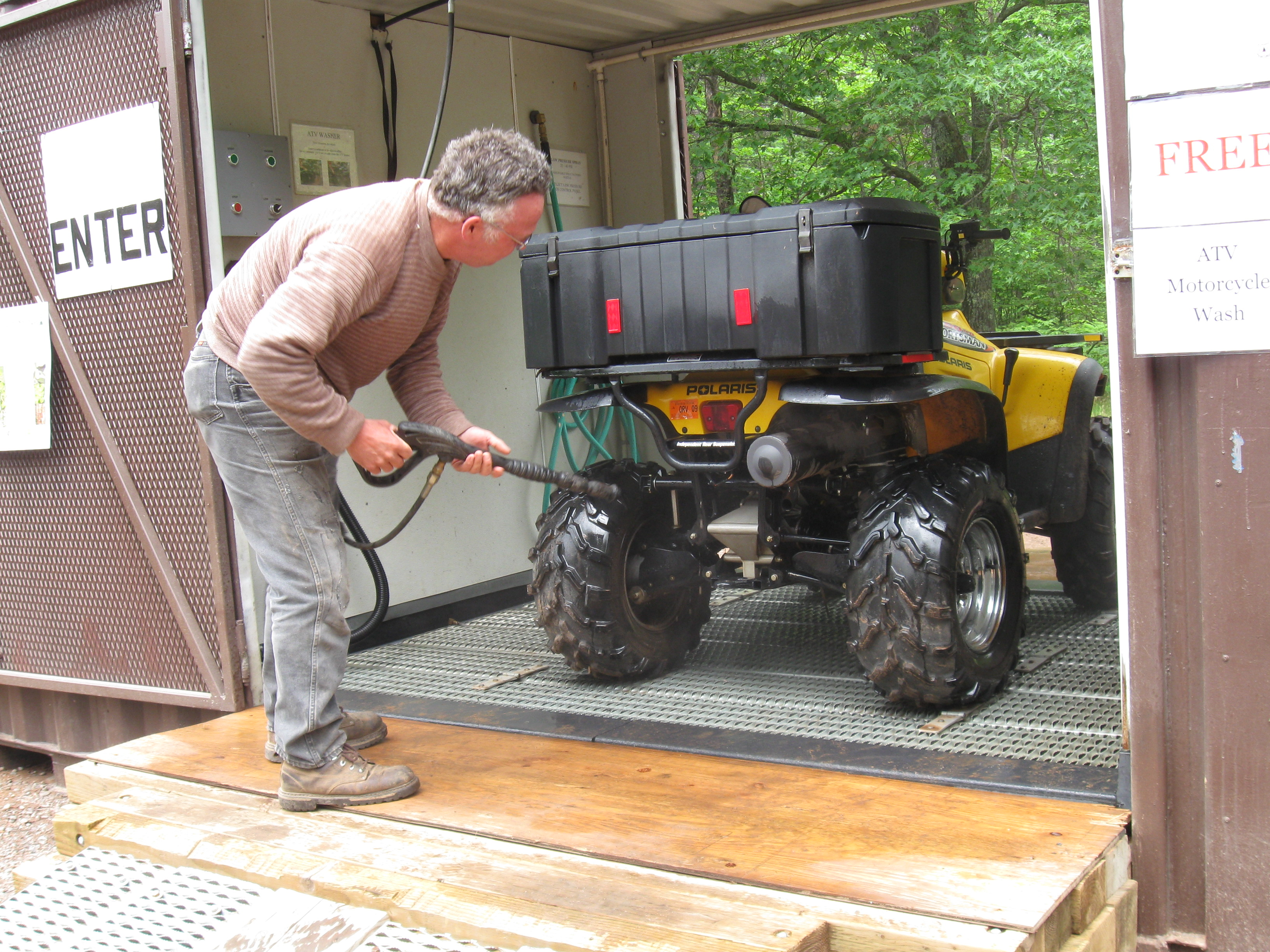
Rider cleaning an ATV at a U.S. Forest Service pressure washer station to prevent the spread of invasive plants.

ATVs using tracks instead of wheels are used at France's Cap Prudhomme in Antarctica.

ATVs are also used in agriculture to bridge the advantages of trucks and tractors.

They are used in a variety of industries for their maneuverability and off-roading ability. These include:

- Border control
- Construction
- Emergency medical services
- Land management
- Law enforcement
- Military
- Mineral exploration
- Oil exploration
- Pipeline transport
- Search and rescue
- Forestry
- Surveying
- Wild land fire control

== Sport competition ==
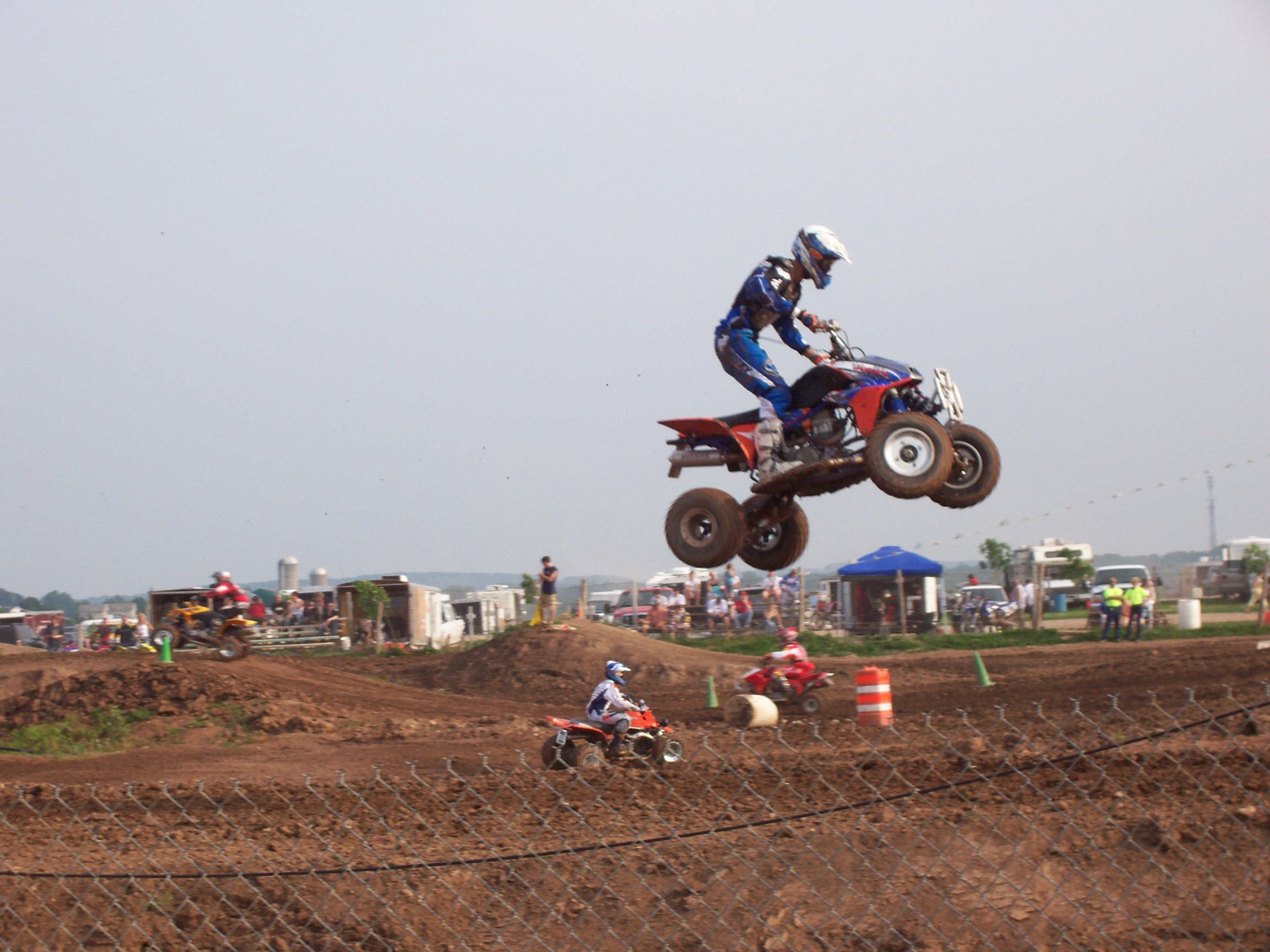
ATV racing on a motocross track

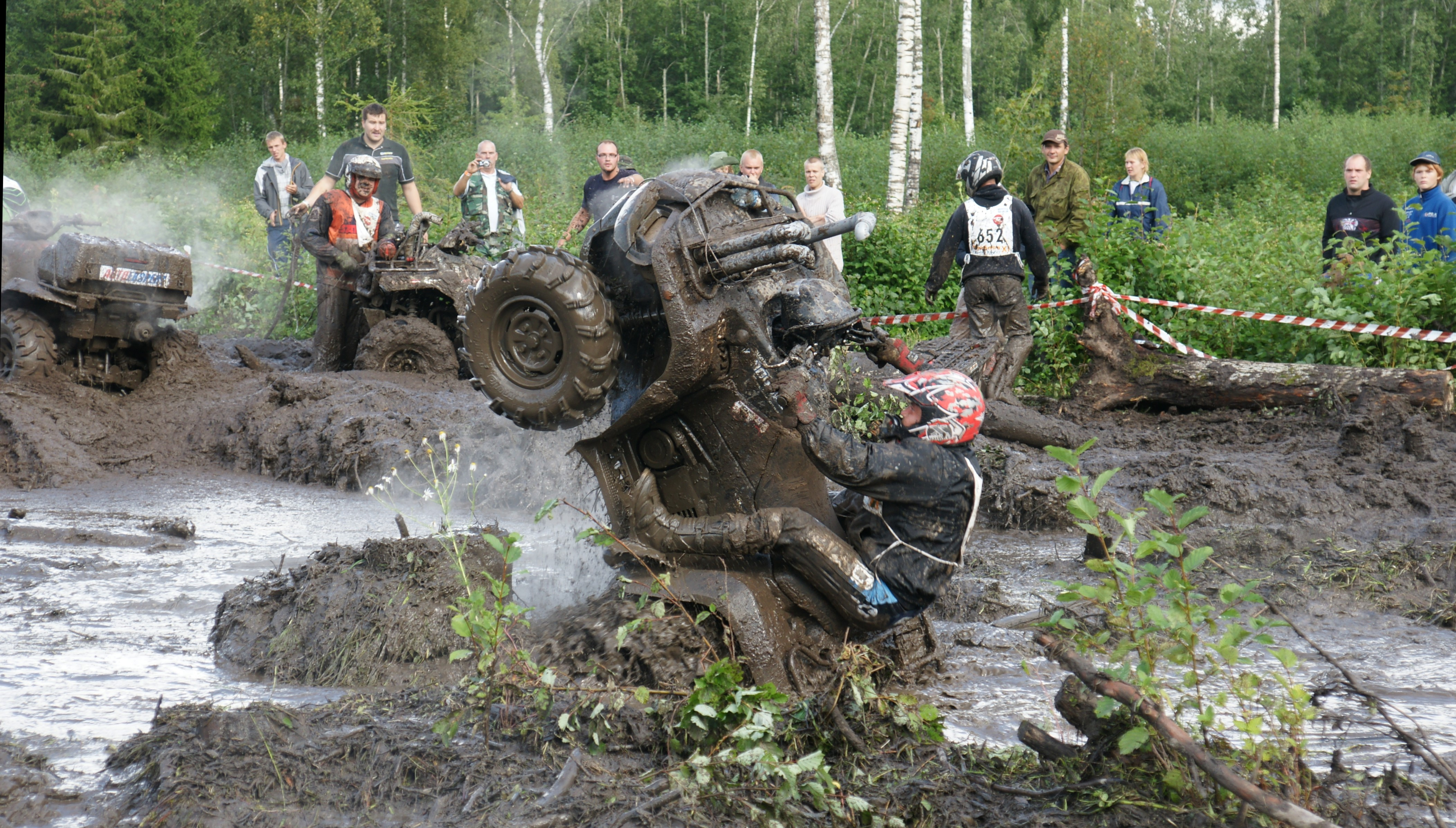
Flip during the Klaperjaht off-road race in Estonia, 2009

Sport models are built with performance, rather than utility, in mind. To be successful at fast trail riding, an ATV must have light weight, high power, good suspension and a low center of gravity. These machines can be modified for such racing disciplines as motocross, woods racing (also known as cross country), desert racing (also known as Hare Scrambles), hill climbing, ice racing, speedway, Tourist Trophy (TT), flat track, drag racing and others.

Throughout the United States and the United Kingdom there are many quad racing clubs with enduro and quadcross sections. GNCC Racing began around 1980 and includes hare scramble and enduro type races. To date, events are mainly held in the eastern part of the United States. GNCC racing features many types of obstacles such as, hill climbing, creek and log crossings, dirt roads and wooded trails.

ATV National Motocross Championship was formed around 1985. ATVMX events are hosted at premiere motocross racetracks throughout the United States. ATVMX consists of several groups, including the Pro (AMA Pro) and Amateur (ATVA) series. Friday involves amateur practicing and racing on Saturday and Sunday. Saturday also involves racing for the Pro Am Women and Pro Am Unlimited classes. Sunday involves racing for the Pro and Pro Am production ATVs, but are scored separately. On average weekend over 500 racers will compete.

The FIM organizes the Quadcross of Nations at the end of the year. The competition involves teams of three riders representing their nations. There are three motos with two riders of each nation competing per moto. The location of the event changes from year to year.

Championship Mud Racing/CMR saw its infancy in 2006 as leaders of the ATV industry recognized a need for uniformity of classes and rules of various local mud bog events. Providing standardized rules created the need for a governing body that both racers and event promoters could turn to and CMR was born. Once unified, a true points series was established and lead to a national championship for what was once nothing more than a hobby for most. In 2007 the finalized board of directors was established and the first races were held in 2008. Currently, the CMR schedule includes eight competition dates spanning from March to November. Points are awarded throughout the season in several different competition classes of ATV and SxS Mud Racing. The 2008 year included Mud Bog and Mudda-Cross competitions, but the 2009 and future seasons will only have Mudda-Cross competitions. Classes range from 0–499 cc to a Super-Modified class which will allow any size ATV in competition. The ultimate goal of the CMR is "to see the growth of ATV Mud Racing as a competitive sport and give competitors a pedestal upon which they can receive the recognition from national media and industry sponsors that they have long deserved."

In 2005 the FIM Cross-Country Rallies World Championship started with a Quad Championship and the Dakar Rally added the Quad category in 2008. Because the 2008 Dakar Rally was cancelled, the 2009 Dakar Rally was the first Dakar Rally with Quads.

Amateur and professional three-wheeler racing across the United States has also spiked in popularity once again, at levels not seen since the factory teams raced in the 1980s. Part of the appeal is the cheapness of parts, and how easy it is to get into. Races are held at various local and large venues, particularly in Ohio, New York, Pennsylvania, Arizona, Michigan and California. Payouts are sometimes awarded to winners.

Each year in June, the world's biggest three-wheeler gathering is held at Haspin Acres, in Laurel, Indiana, for the Trikefest event. Over the course of 3 days complete with camping, hundreds of people gather for the event which features competitive racing such as MX style racing, drag racing, mud racing, hill climbs and other events. For those who wish not to compete, there are also many trails a person can ride. as many as 100 or more three-wheelers show up each year, some built and restored to be raffled off, others brought to ride.

The fastest speed recorded on a quad cycle, or ATV given a flying start, is 315.74 km/h (196.19 mph), by Terry Wilmeth (USA), at the Madras Airport in Madras, Oregon, USA, on 15 June 2008.

== See also ==
- Amphibious ATV
- Car
- Dune buggy
- John Deere
- Motorcycle
- Motorized tricycle
- Motorized quadcycle
- Non-road engine
- Off-road vehicle
- Side-by-side vehicle (SSV)
- Tomcar
- Quadricycle (EU vehicle classification)
- Sd.Kfz._2 aka Kettenrad
