= Suzuki LT250R =

Racing ATV

The Suzuki LT250R was a sport/racing ATV manufactured between 1985 and 1992. It combined a lightweight fully suspended frame with a 249cc liquid cooled two stroke engine.

Nicknamed by Suzuki as the QuadRacer, it revolutionized the (ATV industry). Before this model was released, the ATV racing world was dominated by three-wheelers. Four-wheelers up until this time were heavier, less powerful, and designed more for utility purposes. Then came the Suzuki LT250R. Its lightweight, high horsepower and suspended chassis gave it all of the advantages of its three-wheeled cousins, plus the added stability of an extra wheel up front for cornering at high speeds.

Several aspects of the original LT250R are still commonly used on today's sport and race quads, such as:

- Double "A-Arm" front suspension
- Solid axle rear wheel drive
- Powerful lightweight liquid cooled engine
- Manual transmission and clutch
- Front and rear hydraulic disc brakes
- Chain drive

The Suzuki LT250R “QuadRacer” even had a few extra weight saving features that are rarely found on modern race ATV's. These include the use of a lightweight 2-stroke engine design, kick start with no battery or starter motor required, aluminum swingarm, and no reverse gear.

== 1985 ==
In an apparent attention to weight by engineers, it came with many aluminum parts: swing arm, rear axle carrier, engine cases, front hubs, rear shock link, and the wheels. Even the mufflers on the first two model years were aluminum, something normally only found in the aftermarket racing sector. But the overall advantage in weight (compared to most other quads) is the simplicity of design. The '85 and '86 Quadracers are known as the lightest production full size race quads ever built, tipping the scales at only 293 lbs dry making them similar to the 250cc two stroke racing three wheelers of that era. (They were actually lighter than the Yamaha Tri-Z, slightly heavier than the Kawasaki Tecate 3, and identical in weight to the last generation Honda ATC250R.)

In 85 the Suzuki LT250R QuadRacer became the first high-performance four-wheeler.

Specifications	1985 LT250R
Engine Type	Liquid-cooled, single cylinder, two-stroke
Displacement	249cc
Bore and stroke	70 mm × 64.8 mm (2.76 in × 2.55 in)
Compression ratio	7.2 : 1
Lubrication System	Fuel and oil premixture of 20 : 1
Carburetion	Mikuni VM32SS
Transmission	Manual Clutch, 5-speed
Gearshift Pattern	1-down, 4-up
Starter	Kick Start
Fuel Tank Including Reserve	3.5 gallons
Transmission Oil	1 quart
Wheelbase	43.3 inches
Overall length	72.4 inches
Ground Clearance	5.9 inches
Front Suspension	Independent, double wishbone, oil damped, spring 5-way adjustable
Rear Suspension	Full-Floating suspension system, spring pre-load 4-way adjustable
Front Brakes	Dual hydraulic discs
Rear Brakes	Single hydraulic disc
Front Tires	Dunlop KT786 21x7x10
Rear Tires	Dunlop KT787 22x11x10
Final Drive	Chain 12-42
Dry Weight	293 lbs
MSRP	$2299

== 1986 ==
Mostly the same as 1985 but with a Mikuni VM34SS carburetor. It also had a very slight modification to the decals, and had white hollow letters on the seat spelling "SUZUKI" instead of yellow hollow letters used in '85. It also received an updated port map to the cylinder.

== 1987 ==
"The beaner year", many different changes occurred within this production year, sometimes making parts hard to match up.

The major changes were in the frame, engine, swingarm, and a-arms. The most visible change is in the frame right in front of the cylinder the 85-86 frame has a single down bar, but the '87+ has a single wishbone down-tube. The 85-86 exhaust goes out the side of the cylinder and the '87+ goes straight out the front in between the split downbar, hence the head pipe design changed for '87+. For '87+, a head motor mount was added and connects the engine to the backbone of the frame (under tank). The 85-86 is also a non powervalved motor as the '87+ have powervalves (Suzuki Automatic Exhaust Control). The counterbalancer, bearing and seal were changed in 1988 from the 1987 design. The front shocks are also about 3" longer than previous models. The air intake from the carburetor to the cylinder is in a 5 bolt pattern and larger than the other years providing more air flow and was the same as the 1987 lt500r reed cage. Hence, the 87's are desired by tuners and racers for the larger base air flow. The 1988-on LT250R and the LT250R's big brother, the LT500R or Quadzilla, used the 6-bolt intake design. Also the '87+ used a 6 speed transmission instead of the 5 speed used on the 85-86 models. The engine color was changed from silver used on the 85-86 models to blue for the '87+ models.

For the '87+ model, the swingarm design was changed to a more "beefy" design after cracking / breaking issues with the 85-86 swingarm design. Clearly, the Suzuki engineers underestimated how hard their customers could ride their product. However, the '87+ swingarm will mount to the 85-86 frame with some other minor equipment swap (i.e. rear shock, link). The '87+ rear axle carrier includes forward-reverse slide chain tensioning rather than the 85-86's rotary tensioning method. The '87+ carrier housing slides forward and reverse and then is held in place by four vertical bolts and two rear horizontal bolts whereas the 85-86 carrier was held with a clamp or pinch design.

The '87 and '88 rear axles continued to have 24 splines axles that were the same as the 85-86 models. In '89, this was changed to a 26 spline axle similar to the LT500R. The hubs on the 1987 models went to a 5/130 bolt pattern similar to the LT500R). This was in contrast to the 4/130 bolt pattern of 85–86. The front fenders are the same and will swap between any year. The rear fenders will swap between any year, but the '91 and '92 model years were different under the seat in order to access the air filter which was relocated due to the redesign of the rear suspension. The '91 and '92 rear plastic actually has a curved metal bar riveted under the seat to help support the plastic due to the larger void in the plastic moulding necessary to access the air filter. (Note that the original rear plastic for '85 - '90 is no longer available from Suzuki. All new rear plastic is the '91-92 style with the riveted bar under the seat.)

The seats changed drastically in '87. They flare out at the rear (like a "T") while the 85-86 has a straight seat. There are also some cosmetic differences between the seats of various years. '85 had yellow hollow letters spelling "Suzuki" on the sides. In '86, they changed these letters to white. On the "T" seat in '89, they added the words "QuadRacer" to the back in white letters. In '91 and '92, they added splashes of teal all throughout the blue seat in a "camo" type of pattern.

== 1988–1990 ==
LT250R J, K, L

|- | Engine Type | Liquid-cooled, single cylinder, 2-stroke |- | Displacement | 246cc |- | Bore and stroke | 67.0mm X 70.0mm

Compression Ratio 8.0 to 1

|- | Carburetion | Mikuni TM 34SS |- | Transmission | Manual Clutch, 6-speed |- | Starter | Primary Kick |- | Fuel Tank Capacity | 3.0 gallons |- | Wheelbase | 50.4 inches |- | Overall length | 72 inches |- | Ground Clearance | 4.9 inches |- | Front Suspension | 8.7" travel, dual shocks, preload and rebound adjustable |- | Rear Suspension | 8.7" travel, Suzuki Full Floater single shock, preload, compression, and rebound adjustable |- | Front Brakes | Dual hydraulic discs |- | Rear Brakes | Single hydraulic disc |- | Front Tires | Dunlop 21x7x10 |- | Rear Tires | Dunlop 21x10x10 |- | Final Drive | Chain |- | Dry Weight (1987-1990) | 324 lbs |- | MSRP | $3498 |}

88-92 changed from 5-bolt(87) 8-petal reed valve 6-bolt 6-petal reed valve.

== 1991–1992 ==
 LT250R M, N

The 1991 model year brought about a different linkage in the rear suspension, similar to the LT500R. This necessitated the differences to the rear plastic under the seat as mentioned above.

They also came with rear heel guards that required a few minor changes to the frame, footpegs, and swingarm pivot bolt.

The 1991 LT250R had the following specifications:

Specifications	1991 LT250R
Engine Type	Liquid-cooled, single cylinder, two-stroke
Displacement	249cc
Bore and stroke	67 mm × 70 mm
Carburetion	Mikuni TM 34SS
Transmission	Manual Clutch, 6-speed
Starter	Kick Start
Final Drive	Chain
Suspension/wheel travel, Front	8.7 inches, dual shocks, preload and rebound adjustment
Suspension/wheel travel, Rear	10.6 inches
Front Brakes	Dual Hydraulic Discs
Rear Brakes	Single Hydraulic Disc
Front Tires	21x7-10
Rear Tires	21x10-10
Overall Length	72 inches
Overall Width	46 inches
Wheelbase	50.4 inches
Ground Clearance	4.9 inches
Fuel Capacity	3.0 gallons
Curb Weight	345 lbs
MSRP	$3500
