= OPDS =

OPDS may refer to:

- Open Publication Distribution System, a syndication format for electronic publications
- Offshore Petroleum Distribution System, a U.S. Navy system for use with the Inland Petroleum Distribution System

== See also ==
- OPD (disambiguation)
