= Honda Sport ATCs =

Honda Sport ATCs, produced until 1987, were built specifically for performance, and designed for use in racing, or for aggressive trail riding. The machines lacked luggage racks and other utilitarian features, commonplace on most other ATCs or ATVs.

In 1970, Honda created the three-wheeled “All Terrain Cycle” market nearly single-handedly with the release of the Honda US90. As the popularity of ATCs exploded in the late seventies, Honda began to diversify their line. Originally catering to winter activity, campers, hunters and weekend Recreational riders that ATCs were envisioned for, their research showed there was a market for utility-focused machines for commercial and agricultural use, and dedicated sport models intended for leisure and competition use.

This led to the creation of the ATC250R, a 2-stroke racing ATC based on the CR250 motocross line in 1981 and 3 more Sport ATCs, using 4-stroke engines. The ATC250R remains a popular model for collectors due to its high-performance 2-stroke engines and racing heritage; and the 4-stroke “X” ATCs continue to be popular trail machines.

== Honda ATC200X ==
Honda ATC200X
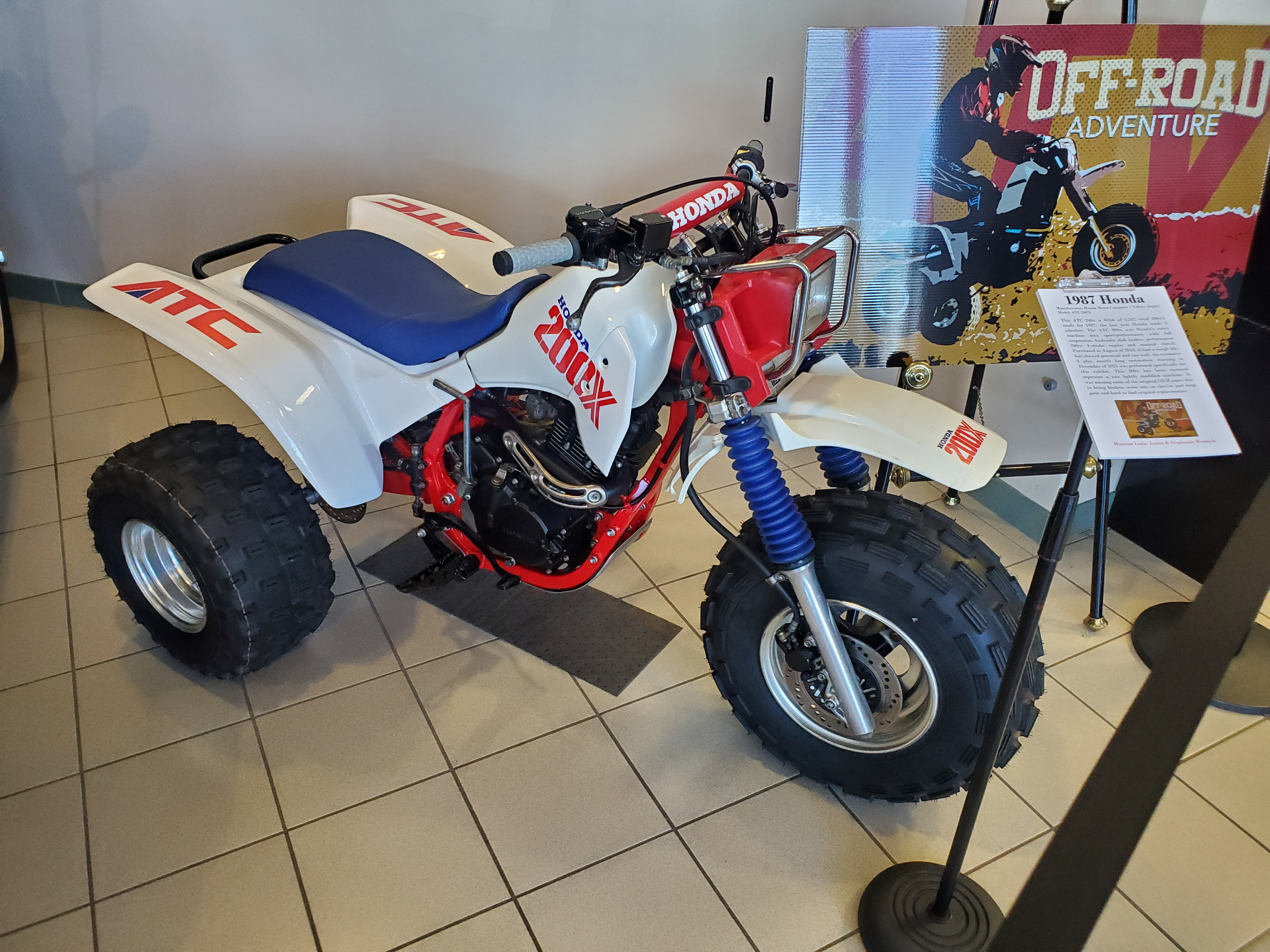
- A 1987 Honda ATC 200X at the AACA Museum in Hershey, Pennsylvania
- Manufacturer: Honda
- Production: 1983 - 1987
- Class: Sport ATC
- Engine: 192 cc (11.7 cu in) Air-cooled four-stroke single
- Bore / stroke: 65 x 57.8mm
- Compression ratio: 142 - 170psi
- Top speed: <58 mph
- Ignition type: CDI
- Transmission: 5-speed with Manual 1986-1987=6-speed with manual Clutch
- Frame type: steel
- Wheelbase: 46.5 in.
- Dimensions: L: 72.4 in. W: 42.5
- Seat height: 27.6 in.
- Weight: 282.1 lbs. (dry)
- Footnotes / references Information provided via Honda ATC200X Service Manual

The ATC200X, released in 1983, was Honda's first 4-stroke Sport model. The machine was based on the ATC200 line, but was virtually unique in its setup and engine tuning. It featured a 5-speed transmission with manual clutch and full suspension with 7.3” of front travel and 6.7” of rear travel.

== Honda ATC250SX ==
Honda ATC250SX
- Manufacturer: Honda
- Production: 1985 - 1987
- Class: Sport ATC
- Engine: 246 cc (15.0 cu in) Air-cooled four-stroke single
- Bore / stroke: 66 x 72mm
- Compression ratio: 142 - 170psi
- Top speed: < 50 Mph
- Ignition type: CDI
- Transmission: 5-speed w/Reverse and Auto Clutch
- Frame type: steel
- Wheelbase: 48.6in.
- Dimensions: L: 74.2 in.
- Seat height: 27.8 in.
- Weight: 357 lbs. (dry)
- Footnotes / references Information provided via 1985 Honda Service Manual

The ATC250SX was introduced alongside the ATC350X in 1985, and available for three model years. Decidedly more a trail machine than a racer, this ATC was equipped with a 246cc 4-Stroke air-cooled OHV engine, with 5-speed auto-clutch transmission and shaft final drive. Stoppage was handled by front and rear drum brakes, and it featured a reverse gear, unique among Honda Sport ATCs. This added to the weight, of nearly 50lbs more than similar machines.

== Honda ATC350X ==
ATC350X
- Manufacturer: Honda
- Production: 1985 - 1986
- Class: Sport ATC
- Engine: 350 cc (21 cu in) Air-cooled four-stroke single
- Bore / stroke: 81 x 68mm
- Compression ratio: 150- 178psi
- Top speed: < 70 Mph
- Ignition type: CDI
- Transmission: 6-speed with Manual Clutch
- Frame type: steel
- Wheelbase: 48.6in.
- Dimensions: L: 74.4 in. W: 43.9
- Seat height: 27.8 in.
- Weight: 320 lbs. (dry)
- Footnotes / references Information provided via Honda ATC350X Service manual

Honda's largest displacement ATC, the ATC350X, would be produced for two years in the United States. Equipped with a 350cc 4-stroke air-cooled OHV engine and 6-speed manual clutch transmission to a chain final drive, the focus was purely on performance.

== Honda ATC250R ==
The ATC250R, built for track racing, was produced from 1981 to 1986. Originally equipped with a 248cc air-cooled engine and 5-speed transmission, it received a 246cc 2-stroke liquid-cooled engine and 6-speed transmission in its third, and last, iteration.
