= ATV Lifeguard =

Patented flexible crush protection device used on ATVs

ATV Lifeguard is a flexible crush protection device (CPD) used on all-terrain vehicles (ATV)s.

In the event of an ATV rollover, the ATV Lifeguard will flex over a person on the ground while bearing the load of the ATV - thus preventing the rider from being crushed. ATV Lifeguard is the only flexible roll bar for ATVs - it is made of 60 segments that all flex and move.

The Lifeguard is installed on the rear rack of an ATV. It can support weights up to 500 kilograms (1,100 lb).

Lifeguard was invented by Vernon Suckling, founder of Ag-tech Industries, a company based in Dargaville, New Zealand.

In 2017 Australian Competition & Consumer Commission (ACCC) began investigating the mandatory safety standard for ATVs. This resulted in legislation requiring all new quad bikes to have an operator protection device (OPD) fitted. The safety standard issued by the ACCC specified two models: the Quadbar and the ATV Lifeguard.

== Timeline ==
- 2012 - ATV LifeGuard was invented
- 2012 - Won the Innovations Golden Standard Award at Mystery Creek National Fielddays
- 2013 - Winner of the NZ Workplace Health & Safety Award
