= Yamaha Grizzly =

Large utility all-terrain vehicle

The Yamaha Grizzly is a large utility all-terrain vehicle manufactured by the Yamaha Motor Company.

== 600 Series ==
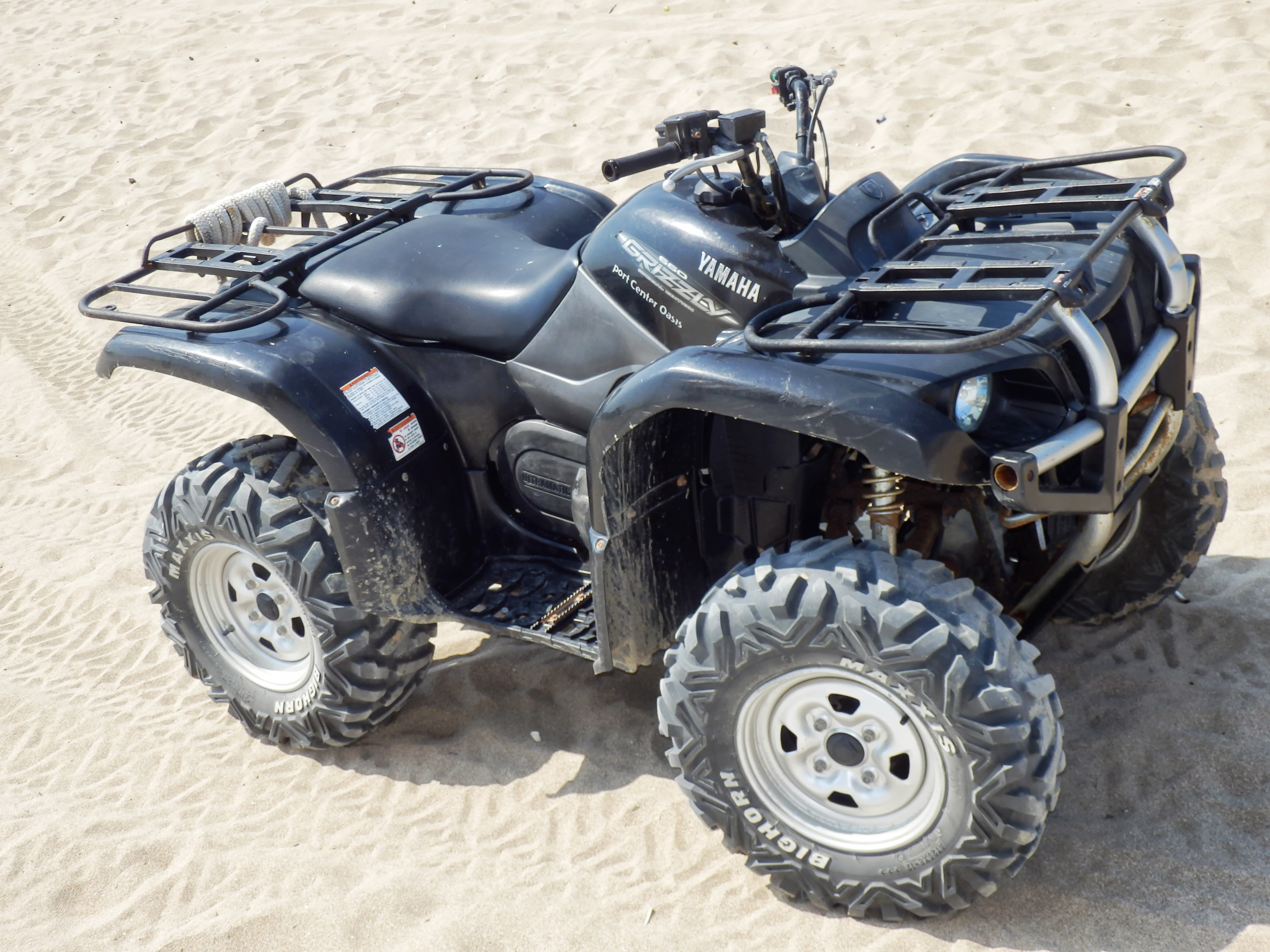
Yamaha Grizzly 660

The Yamaha Grizzly 600 has a 595cc four-stroke engine from the XT600. Yamaha replaced the Grizzly 600 with the new Grizzly 660 using a larger engine that is 660cc derived from the Raptor 660 with a five-valve cylinder head.

Beyond the engine, the biggest differences between the Grizzly 600 (offered in the US from 1998 to 2001) and the Grizzly 660 (introduced in 2002), is the rear suspension. The older Grizzly has a rigid rear axle with a single shock. The newer Grizzly has independent rear suspension with dual shocks. This is reported to have significantly improved the handling characteristics of the newer model. The Grizzly includes push button 4 wheel drive and diff lock.

== 700 Series ==
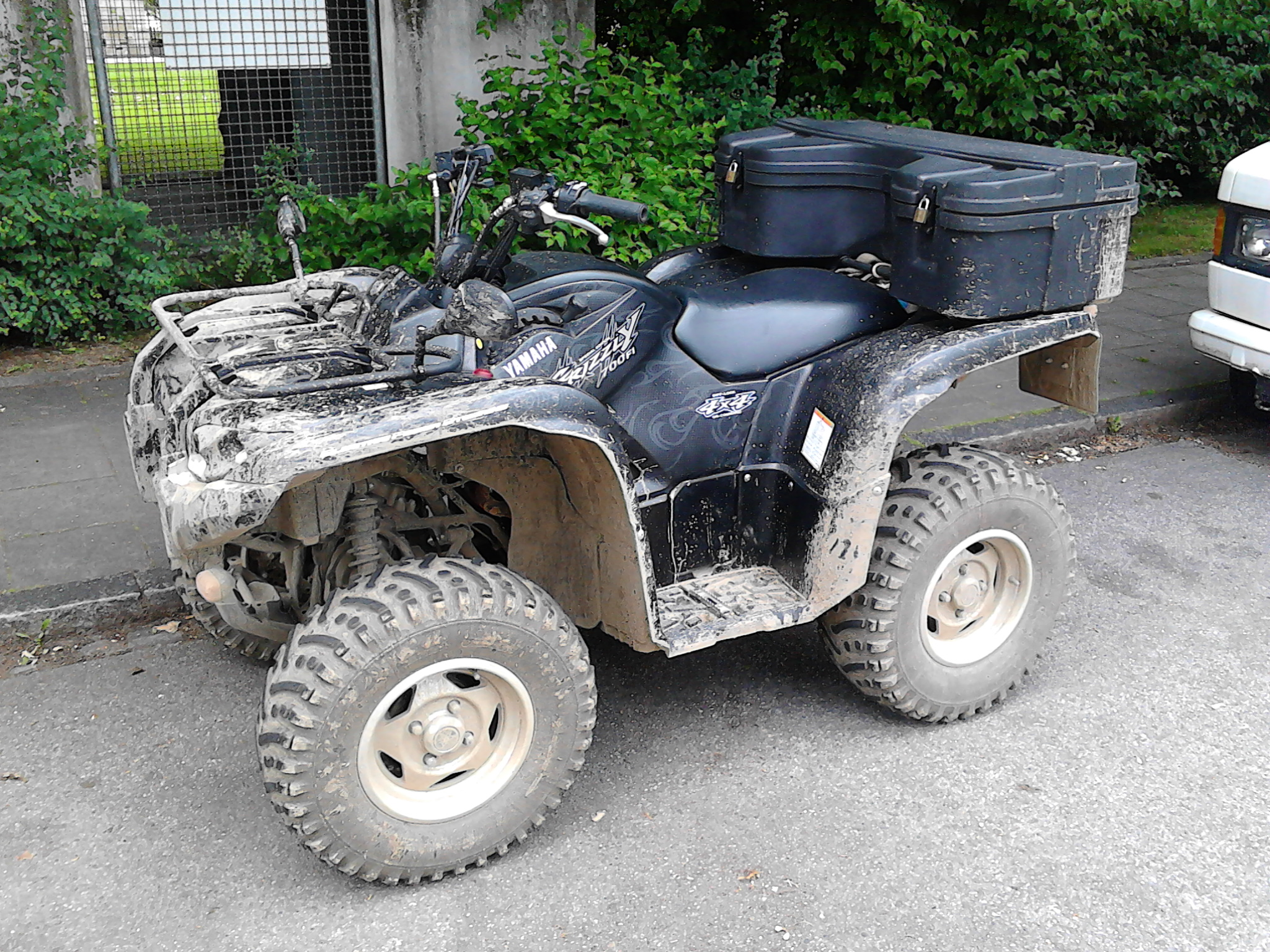
Yamaha Grizzly 700

In 2007, Yamaha came out with the Grizzly 700 that provides fuel injection and optional EPS (electric power steering). Also, the 700 uses "gull wing" bent axle on the rear, allowing for a shorter frame, and reduced weight. The Grizzly 700 remained largely the same until 2016 when it was facelifted, and was fitted with a new 708cc single cylinder four stroke engine developed in partnership with Subaru. This engine proved to be troublesome, developing oil burning problems early in the vehicles life and poorly designed top ends. The 708 engine lasted for 2016, 2017, and 2018, but in 2019, Yamaha went back to the 686cc engine that had been in the 700 Grizzlies since 2007.
