= National Trauma Data Bank =

Compilation of U.S. traumatic injury data from participating institutions

The National Trauma Data Bank (NTDB), also called the American College of Surgeons National Trauma Data Bank, is a compilation of information about traumatic injuries and outcomes in the United States. Hospital emergency rooms and other institutions such as trauma centers which are participants submit data and receive in return access to reports analyzing data about both their own operations and trauma medicine in the United States as a whole.

Annual reports, an annual report and a pediatric report, which include demographic information is issued. Access to data sets is available to researchers who apply and are approved.
