= Operator protection device =

Crush protection device used on ATVs

An operator protection device (OPD) is a device that protects the operator of machinery.

The term has been adopted by the Australian Competition & Consumer Commission (ACCC) to describe devices used to protect all-terrain vehicle (ATV) riders from being crushed in the event of an accident.

In the event of an ATV rollover, an OPD will flex over or around a person on the ground while bearing the load of the ATV - thus preventing the rider from being crushed.

In 2017 the ACCC began investigating the mandatory safety standard for ATVs. This resulted in legislation requiring all new quad bikes to have an OPD fitted.

The safety standard issued by the ACCC specified two models: the Quadbar and the ATV Lifeguard. Since the standard has been issued, the makers of ATV Lifeguard have developed and released the QuadGuard.

OPDs are sometimes referred to as crush protection devices (CPDs) or roll-over protective structures (ROPS).
