= Ellenator =

Vehicle conversion by Wenzeslaus Ellenrieder

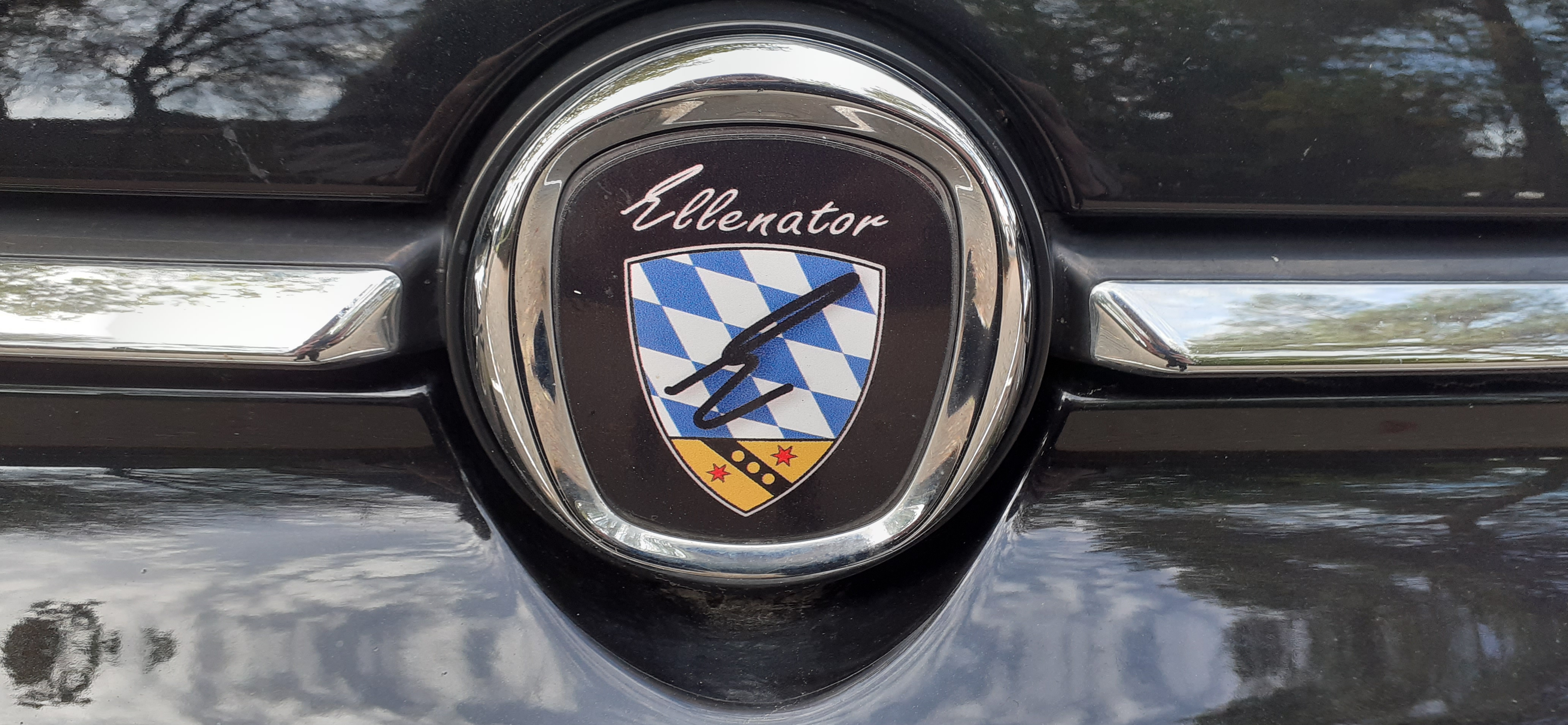
Logo of a Fiat 500-based Ellenator

The Ellenator is a German vehicle conversion developed by Wenzeslaus Ellenrieder. Although Ellenator vehicles have four wheels, the two rear wheels are positioned close together, allowing them to be legally classified as three-wheeled vehicles in the European L5e vehicle category. Their power is limited to 15 kW, allowing them to be driven in Germany from the age of 16 with an A1 driving licence. The name Ellenator is derived from Ellenrieder's surname.
