= Honda ATC200 =

All-terrain vehicle

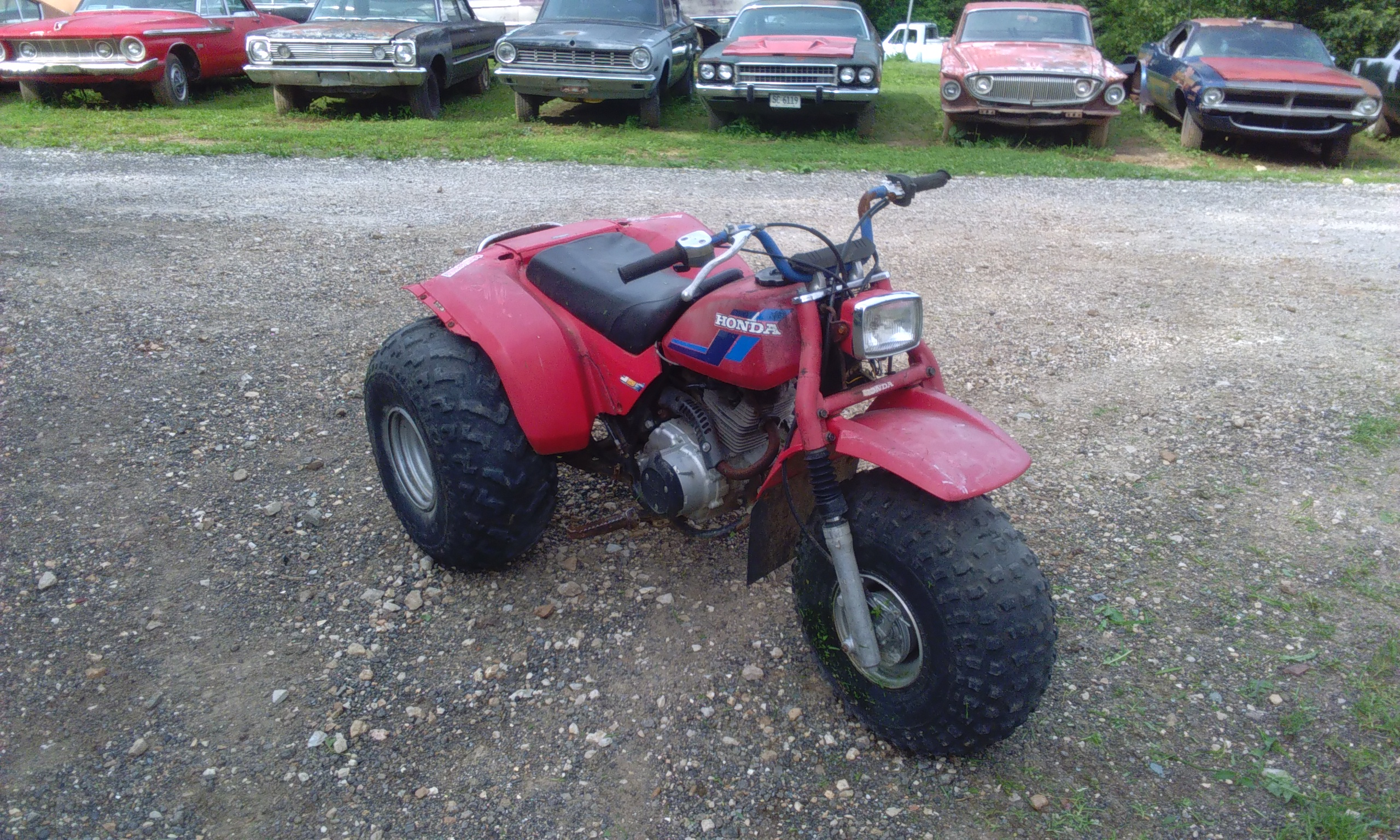
A 1984 Honda ATC200S

The Honda ATC200 is an all-terrain vehicle that was introduced in 1981 as Honda's top model in the ATC line-up, remaining, in various forms, until Honda voluntarily ceased production in 1987. In the six years of production, six variations were made, often sold concurrently. Collectively, Honda produced over 400,000 ATC200s, becoming the most prolific sellers in the ATC market and one of the most recognizable ATCs available.

All ATC200 models are equipped with a 192cc 4-Stroke air-cooled OHV engine. Variations between models involve suspension, transmissions, electric start options, standard equipment racks, and final drive. All machines, with the exception of the sportier kick-starting ATC200X, 350X, 250SX and 250ES, came with recoil-pull starters, which remained when electric start was provided. All models except the ATC200X feature front and rear drum brakes.

== ATC200 line-up ==
	Manufactured	Purpose	Electric Starting	Dual-Range	Reverse	Shaft/Chain	Front Suspension	Rear Suspension	Racks
ATC200	1981-83	Recreation	No	No	No	Chain	1983 Only	No	Optional
ATC200E	1982-84	Utility	Yes	Yes	No	Chain	Yes	No	F/R Standard
ATC200ES	1984	Utility	Yes	Yes	Yes	Shaft	Yes	No	F/R Standard
ATC200M	1984-85	Recreation	Yes	No	No	Chain	Yes	No	Optional
ATC200S	1984-86	Recreation	No	No	No	Chain	Yes	No	Optional
ATC200X	1983-87	Sport	No	No	No	Chain	Yes	Yes	N/A
Information provided Via Honda Service Manuals - See references

The ATC200, released in 1981 and sold for three model years, featured a 5-speed Auto-clutch single range transmission and Chain final drive. The ATC received front suspension on 1983, a trait all 200cc models would continue during production. Front and rear racks were dealer option items. Honda produced this ATC after market research determined that their products were being used for commercial and agricultural endeavors, and tailored the machine for those needs.

ATC200E "Big Red" came with a 5-speed Auto-clutch transmission, with secondary dual-range (known as a "Sub-Mission" in Advertising) and chain final drive. It also featured front suspension but maintained a rigid rear. This was the natural evolution of the prior ATCs used for commercial applications and is designed for utilitarian work. It also introduced Electric starting, and front and rear racks were standard equipment.

ATC200ES "Big Red", produced in 1984, was a further evolution of the ATC200E, adding a reverse gear, still no rear suspension but added shaft final drive. Power transmission was delivered via a 5-speed Auto-clutch dual range transmission. It is a utility ATC with electric starting, and front and rear racks were again standard equipment.

The ATC200M was released in 1984, providing front suspension, a 5-speed Auto-clutch single range transmission, and chain final drive. Electric start was also a selling point on the mid-range model, intended to appeal to recreational riders, such as campers, hunters and fisherman. A rear and front rack for cargo was optional.

The ATC200S, produced from 1984 to 1986 was the 200cc line base-model. The ATC200S had no rear suspension and chain final drive. Electric start was never offered as an option for this model, and did not come standard with racks, but were available as an option. It did have the same 5-speed Auto-clutch transmission. Unlike the other ATC200 models, the ATC200S was equipped with 22 inch tires instead of 25 inch tires.

The ATC200X, being offered from 1983 to 1987, is the longest consistently offered model in the 200cc line. It is also the most unique, as it was designed for sport riding. It was used for the 200cc class of ATC racing. While the engine is the same as the recreation/utility models, it features subtle tuning changes, kick-starting, a unique 5-speed manual transmission and chain final drive. It has no contingencies for factory racks, and features a sport-tuned full suspension (Telescopic forks front/ Monoshock rear), the only model to do so. It is also the only 200cc model to feature disc brakes, equipped both front and rear.
