= Honda US90 =

- Manufacturer: Honda
- Also called: Honda ATC90 (1974-1978)
- Production: 1970-1978
- Successor: Honda ATC110
- Class: Recreational ATC
- Engine: 89.5 cc (5.46 cu in) Single-cylinder horizontal mount OHV engine
- Bore / stroke: 50 mm × 45.6 mm (1.97 in × 1.80 in)
- Compression ratio: 7.5:1
- Transmission: 4-Speed Auto-Clutch Dual Range
- Frame type: steel
- Suspension: None
- Brakes: Rear drum
- Tires: 22 x 11 x 3.5 Ohtsu L-1/L-2 (1970-1973); 22 x 11 x 8 Ohtsu B900 front and rear (1974-1978)
- Wheelbase: 40 in.
- Dimensions: L: 63 in. W: 38.2 in
- Seat height: 25 in.
- Weight: 228 lbs. (dry)
- Fuel capacity: 1.6 gal
- Oil capacity: 1 qt

The Honda US90 was a three-wheeled Recreational vehicle designed by Osamu Takeuchi. Development began in 1967, in response to requests from American dealers for products to sell in the motorcycle off-season. Takeuchi considered many variations before settling on a three-wheeled design with low-pressure ballon tires, driven by an enlarged Honda ST70 engine, through a 4 Speed Dual-Range Semi automatic clutched transmission.

== 1st Generation US90 (1970-1973) ==
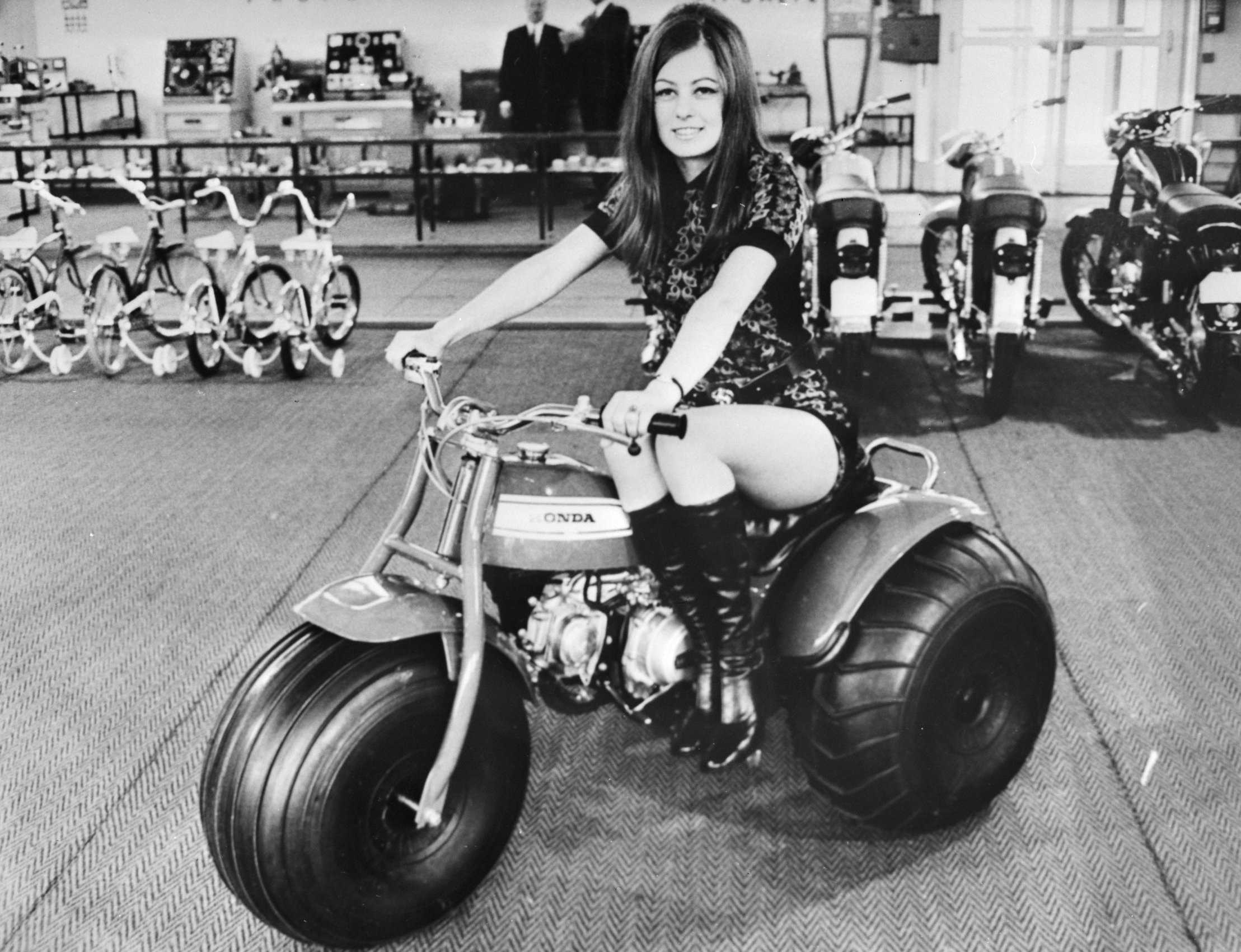
US 90 in Austria, 1971

The Initial US90 was offered at $595 in 1970, and featured an 89cc engine producing 7 hp. The US90 designation was used until 1973, when Honda successfully trademarked the moniker ‘All Terrain Cycle’. The designation was then changed to ATC90. The ATC prefix would be used for all Honda Three-Wheeled-Vehicles until production ceased in 1987, and become a universal epithet for other manufacturers three-wheeled machines.

== 2nd Generation ATC90 (1974-1978) ==
The US90 had been designed without suspension, which would be common place on ATC’s for the first decade. Cushioning for the rider was provided by the low-pressure hubless and rimless tires, which also provided a low-impact impression on the environments it traversed. For all the benefits, the tires proved to be fragile in rougher terrain, and expensive to replace. This led to Honda developing traditional tire-and-rim designs in 1975, a feature continued on All-Terrain-Vehicles to this day.

== 3rd Generation ATC110 (1979-1985) ==
The ATC90’s horizontally positioned engine grew to 105cc in 1979, when it was then marketed under the ATC110 designation. In 1985, this machine was phased out for the more contemporary 2nd generation Honda ATC125M. Despite fifteen years in the market, the US90 was continually developed and improved, receiving incremental changes yearly, and four significant updates, maintaining its relevance until 1985.

== 4th Generation ATC125M (1984-1985) ==
The fourth evolution of the US90 would continue the previous trend of an increase in engine size, but also included the addition of Electric start. The newest model, in recognition of the 124cc displacement, was designated the ATC125M. This model was sold concurrently with the ATC110, and continued the use of the Horizontal engine with 4-speed, dual-range Auto-Clutch transmission.

The ATM125M was significantly revised for the 1986 model year, and thought it continued to use the ATC125M designation, this model was significantly changed from the previous iteration, and can be recognized as a new machine more closely akin to the ATC200 line.
