= Kiwi drive =

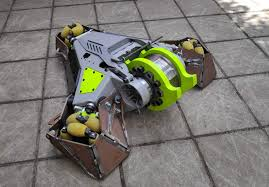
the BattleBot OMINOUS, shown here with a Kiwi Drive

A Kiwi drive is a holonomic drive system of three omni-directional wheels (such as omni wheels or Mecanum wheels), 120 degrees from each other, that enables movement in any direction using only three motors. This is in contrast with non-holonomic systems such as traditionally wheeled or tracked vehicles which cannot move sideways without turning first.

This drive system is similar to the Killough platform which achieves omni-directional travel using traditional non-omni-directional wheels in a three-wheel configuration.. The term "Kiwi" was a code word for Killough used by FIRST Robotics Competition team 857 students, for their 2002 robot.

== Motion ==
When only the front wheel is powered, the chassis will turn and strafe at once. If the back wheels turn the same amount in the same direction, the strafe is cancelled out, so the chassis will only turn. If the back wheels turn half as much in the opposite direction, the turn is cancelled out, so the chassis will only strafe. If the front wheel is not powered, and the back wheels turn the same amount in opposite directions, the chassis will only drive..

== Mathematics ==
A Kiwi drive controls motors ($M_{\text{front}}, M_{\text{right}}, M_{\text{left}}$) to achieve a target velocity vector $(X, Y)$ and rotation speed $\theta$. If $M_{\text{front}}$ is perpendicular to the X-axis:

$M_{\text{front}} = X + \theta$

$M_{\text{right}} = -\frac 1 2 (X - \sqrt3 Y) + \theta$

$M_{\text{left}} = -\frac 1 2 (X + \sqrt3 Y) + \theta$
