= Wheel =

Circular component rotating on an axle

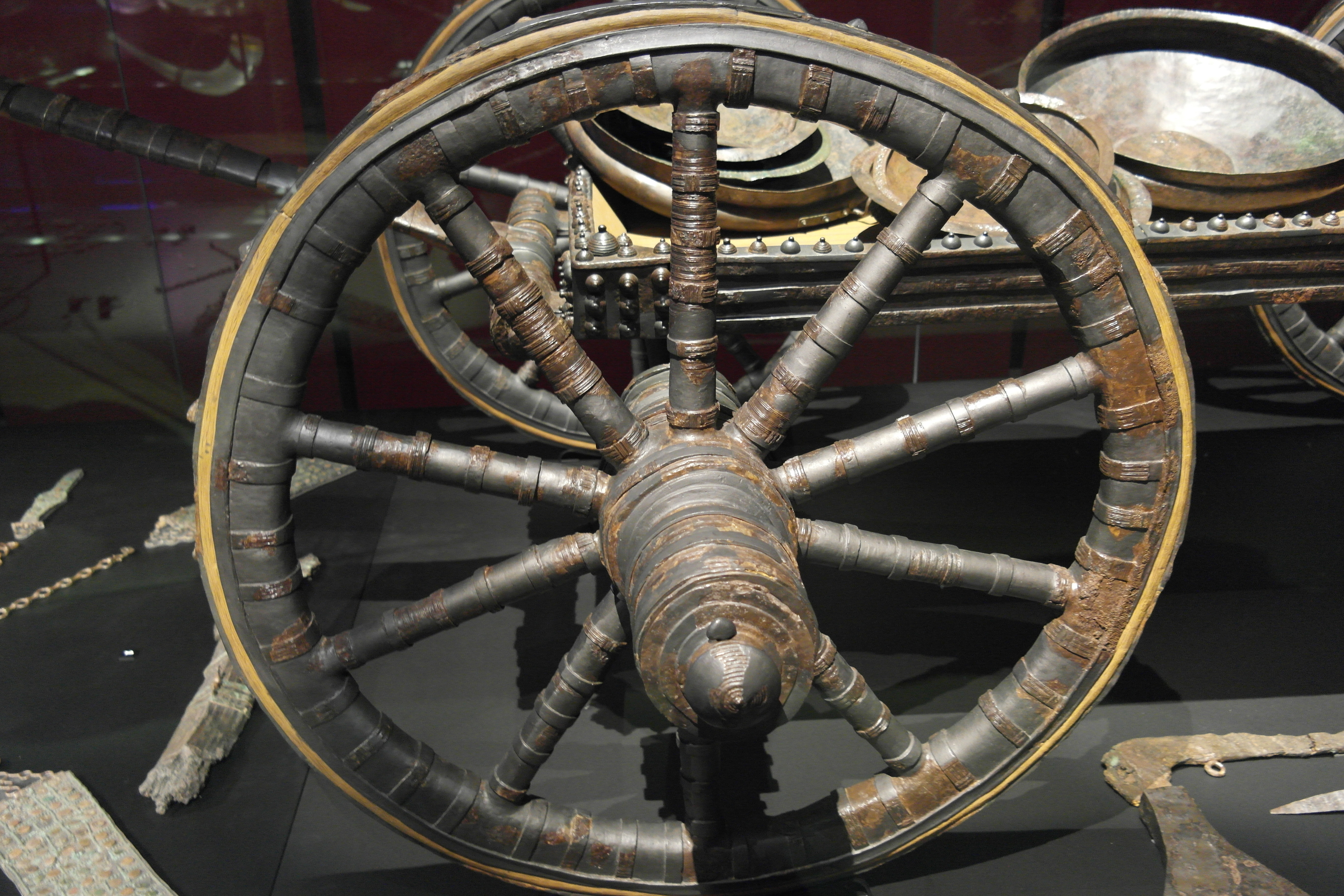
- Spoked wheel of reconstructed Celtic funerary wagon, 550 BCE, Hochdorf Chieftain's Grave, Germany
- Type: Invention
- Inception: Before c. 3500–3350 BCE
- Available: Globally

A wheel is a rotating component (typically circular in shape) intended to turn on an axle bearing. The wheel is one of the key components of the wheel and axle, which is one of the six simple machines. Wheels, in conjunction with axles, allow heavy objects to be moved easily, facilitating transportation, supporting loads, and performing work in machines. Wheels are also used for other purposes, such as a ship's wheel, steering wheel, potter's wheel, and flywheel.

Common examples can be found in transport applications. A wheel reduces friction by facilitating motion by rolling together with the use of axles. For a wheel to rotate, a moment must be applied to the wheel about its axis, either by gravity or by the application of another external force or torque.

== Terminology ==
The English word wheel comes from the Old English word hwēol, from Proto-Germanic *hwehwlaz, from Proto-Indo-European *k^{w}ék^{w}los, an extended form of the root *k^{w}el- 'to revolve, move around'. Cognates within Indo-European include Icelandic hjól 'wheel, tyre', Greek κύκλος kúklos, and Sanskrit chakra, the last two both meaning 'circle' or 'wheel'.

== History ==
The wheel undoubtedly evolved from pre-historic use of rollers (round tree logs) to move heavier objects such as rock slabs and bigger logs. The invention of the solid wooden wheel (disk on axle) dates to the late Neolithic and may be seen in conjunction with other technological advances that gave rise to the early Bronze Age. This implies the passage of several wheel-less millennia even after the invention of agriculture and of pottery, during the pre-pottery Neolithic.

- 4500–3300 BCE (Copper Age): invention of the potter's wheel; earliest solid wooden wheels (disks with a hole for the axle); earliest wheeled vehicles
- 3300–2200 BCE (Early Bronze Age)
- 2200–1550 BCE (Middle Bronze Age): invention of the spoked wheel and the chariot; domestication of the horse

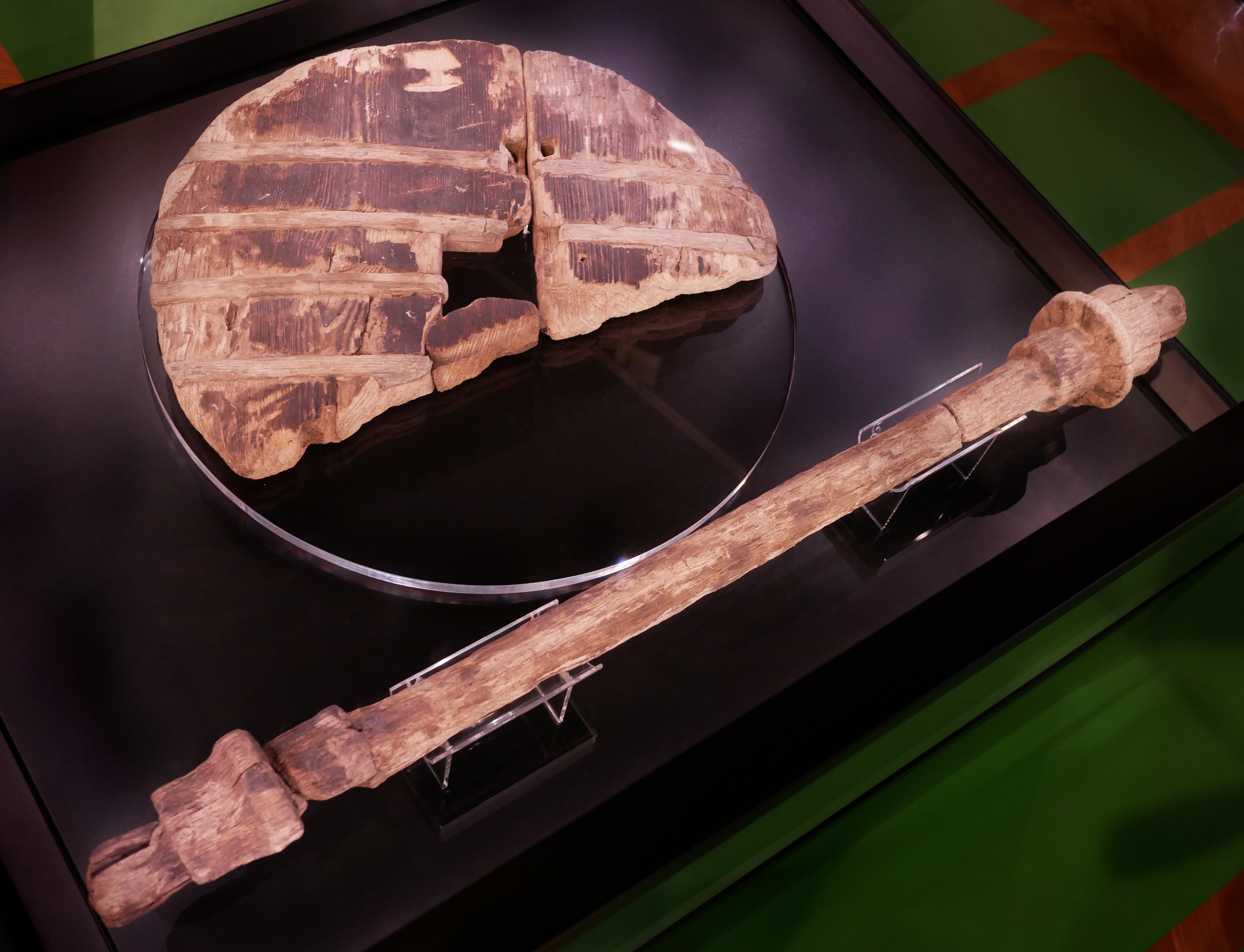
The Ljubljana Marshes Wheel with axle, the oldest wooden wheel yet discovered, dating to the Copper Age (c. 3130 BCE)

The Halaf culture of 6500–5100 BCE is sometimes credited with the earliest depiction of a wheeled vehicle, but there is no evidence that Halafians used wheeled vehicles or pottery wheels. Potter's wheels are thought to have been used in the 4th millennium BCE in the Middle East. The oldest surviving example of a potter's wheel was thought to be one found in Ur (modern Iraq) dating to approximately 3100 BCE. However, a potter's wheel found in western Ukraine, of the Cucuteni–Trypillia culture, dates to the middle of the 5th millennium BCE which predates the earliest use of the potter's wheel in Mesopotamia. Wheels of uncertain dates have been found in the Indus Valley civilization of the late 4th millennium BCE covering areas of modern India and Pakistan.

The oldest indirect evidence of wheeled movement was found in the form of miniature clay wheels north of the Black Sea before 4000 BCE. From the middle of the 4th millennium BCE onward, the evidence is condensed throughout Europe in the form of toy cars, depictions, or ruts, with the oldest find in Northern Germany dating back to around 3400 BCE. In Mesopotamia, depictions of wheeled wagons found on clay tablet pictographs at the Eanna district of Uruk, in the Sumerian civilization are dated to c. 3500–3350 BCE. In the second half of the 4th millennium BCE, evidence of wheeled vehicles appeared near-simultaneously in the Northern (Maykop culture) and South Caucasus and Eastern Europe (Cucuteni–Trypillia culture).

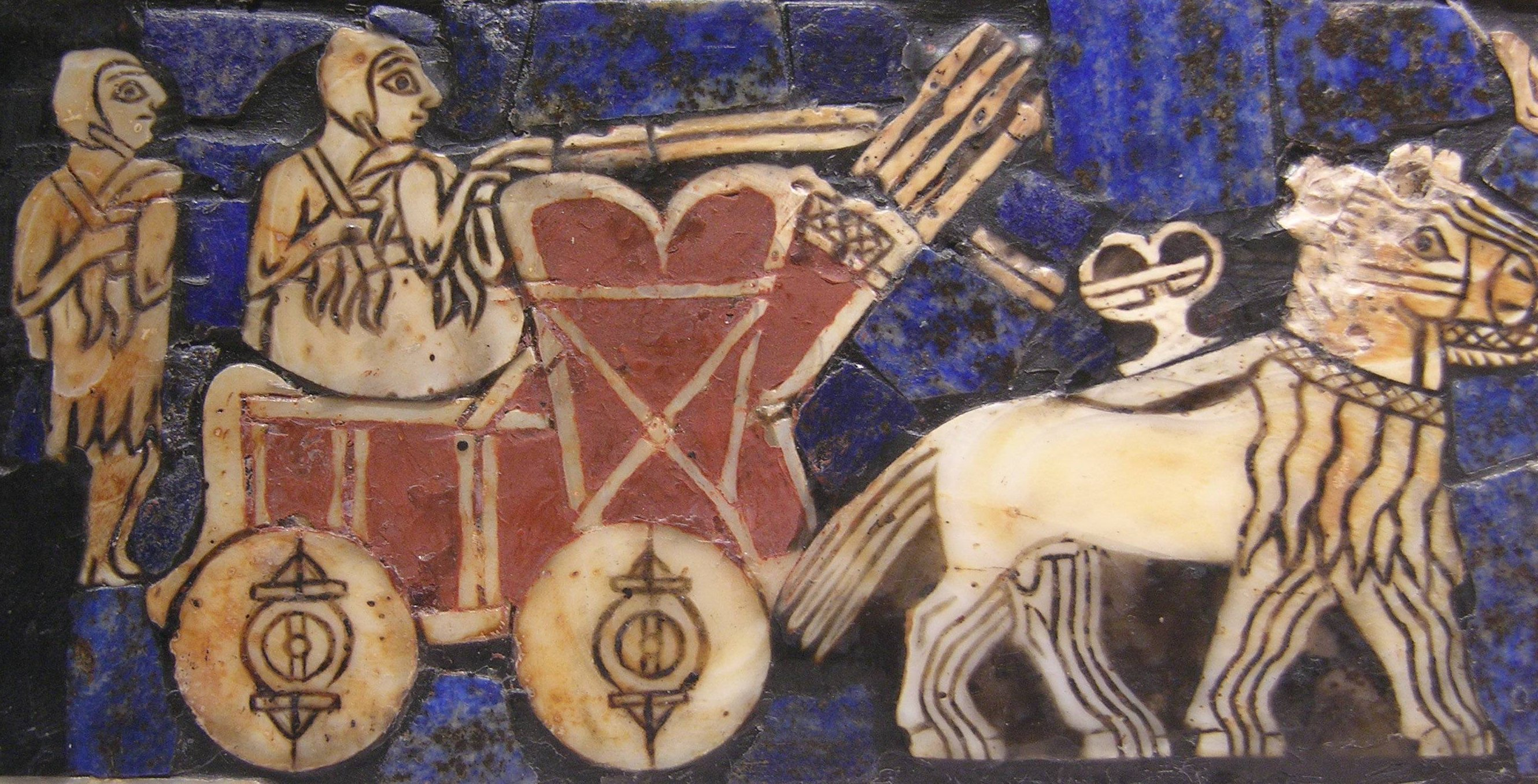
A depiction of an onager-drawn cart on the Sumerian "War" panel of the Standard of Ur (c. 2500 BCE)

Depictions of a wheeled vehicle appeared between 3631 and 3380 BCE in the Bronocice clay pot excavated in a Funnelbeaker culture settlement in southern Poland. In nearby Olszanica, a 2.2 m wide door was constructed for wagon entry; this barn was 40 m long with three doors, dated to 5000 BCE, and belonged to the Neolithic Linear Pottery culture. Surviving evidence of a wheel-axle combination, from Stare Gmajne near Ljubljana in Slovenia (wooden Ljubljana Marshes Wheel), is dated within two standard deviations to 3340–3030 BCE, the axle to 3360–3045 BCE. Two types of early Neolithic European wheel and axle are known: a circumalpine type of wagon construction (the wheel and axle rotate together, as in Ljubljana Marshes Wheel), and that of the Baden culture in Hungary (axle does not rotate). They both are dated to c. 3200–3000 BCE. Some historians believe that there was a diffusion of the wheeled vehicle from the Near East to Europe around the mid-4th millennium BCE.

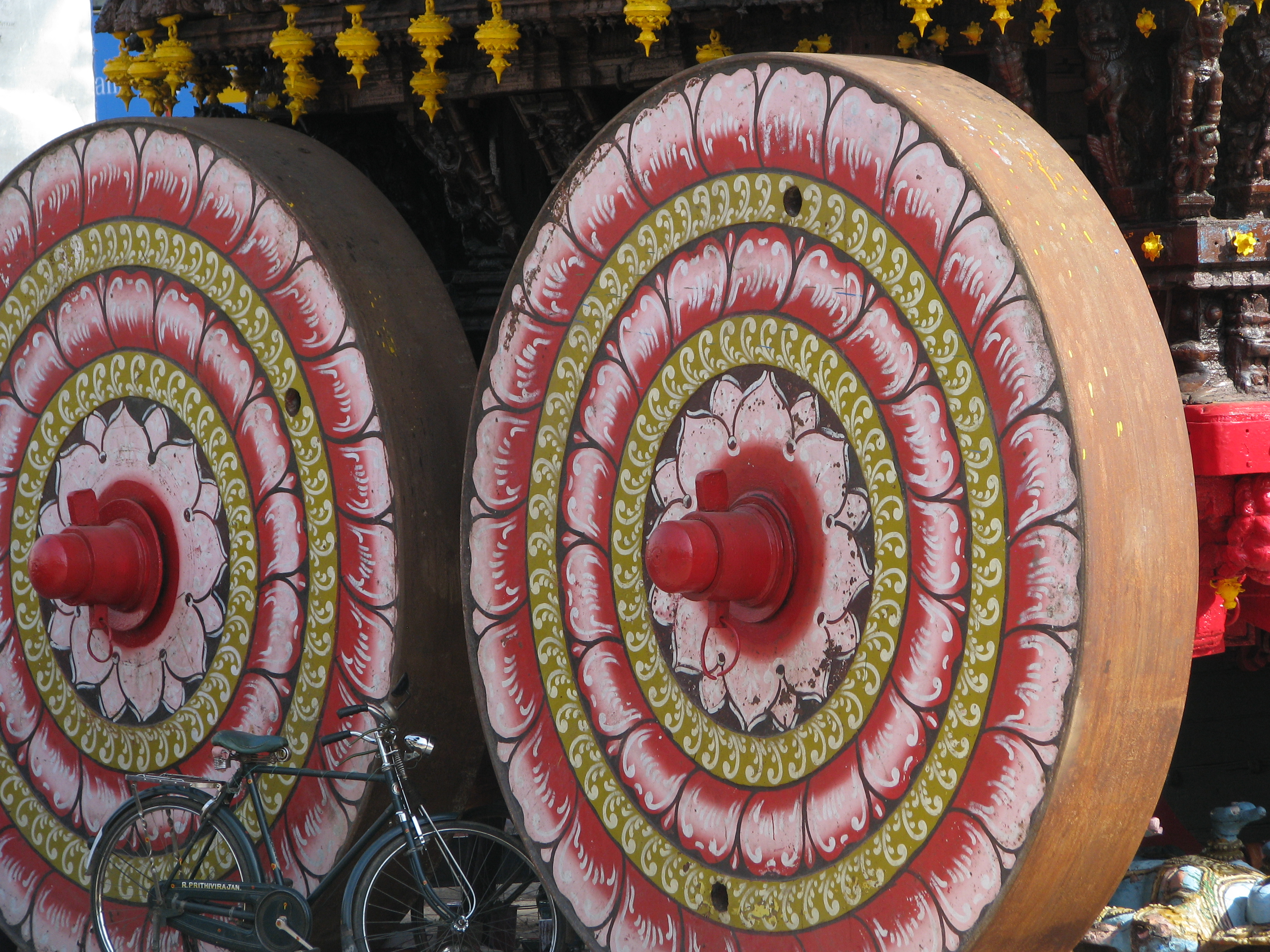
Solid wheels on a heavy temple car, contrasted with the lighter wire-spoked wheels of the black roadster bicycle in the foreground

Early wheels were simple wooden disks with a hole for the axle. Some of the earliest wheels were made from horizontal slices of tree trunks. Because of the uneven structure of wood, a wheel made from a horizontal slice of a tree trunk will tend to be inferior to one made from rounded pieces of longitudinal boards.

The spoked wheel was invented more recently and allowed the construction of lighter and swifter vehicles. The earliest known examples of wooden spoked wheels are from the Sintashta culture, dating to c. 2000 BCE (Krivoye Lake). Soon after this, horse cultures of the Caucasus region used horse-drawn spoked-wheel war chariots for the greater part of three centuries. They moved deep into the Greek peninsula, where they joined with the existing Mediterranean peoples to give rise, eventually, to classical Greece after the breaking of Minoan dominance and consolidations led by pre-classical Sparta and Athens. Celtic chariots introduced an iron rim around the wheel in the 1st millennium BCE.

In China, wheel tracks dating to around 2200 BCE have been found at Pingliangtai, a site of the Longshan Culture. Similar tracks were also found at Yanshi, a city of the Erlitou culture, dating to around 1700 BCE. The earliest evidence of spoked wheels in China comes from Qinghai, in the form of two wheel hubs from a site dated between 2000 and 1500 BCE. Wheeled vehicles were introduced to China from the west.

In Britain, a large wooden wheel, measuring about 1 m (3.3 ft) in diameter, was uncovered at the Must Farm site in East Anglia in 2016. The specimen, dating from 1,100 to 800 BCE, represents the earliest and most complete of its type found in Britain. The wheel's hub is also present. A horse's spine found nearby suggests the wheel may have been part of a horse-drawn cart. The wheel was found in a settlement built on stilts over a wetland, indicating that the settlement had some link to dry land.

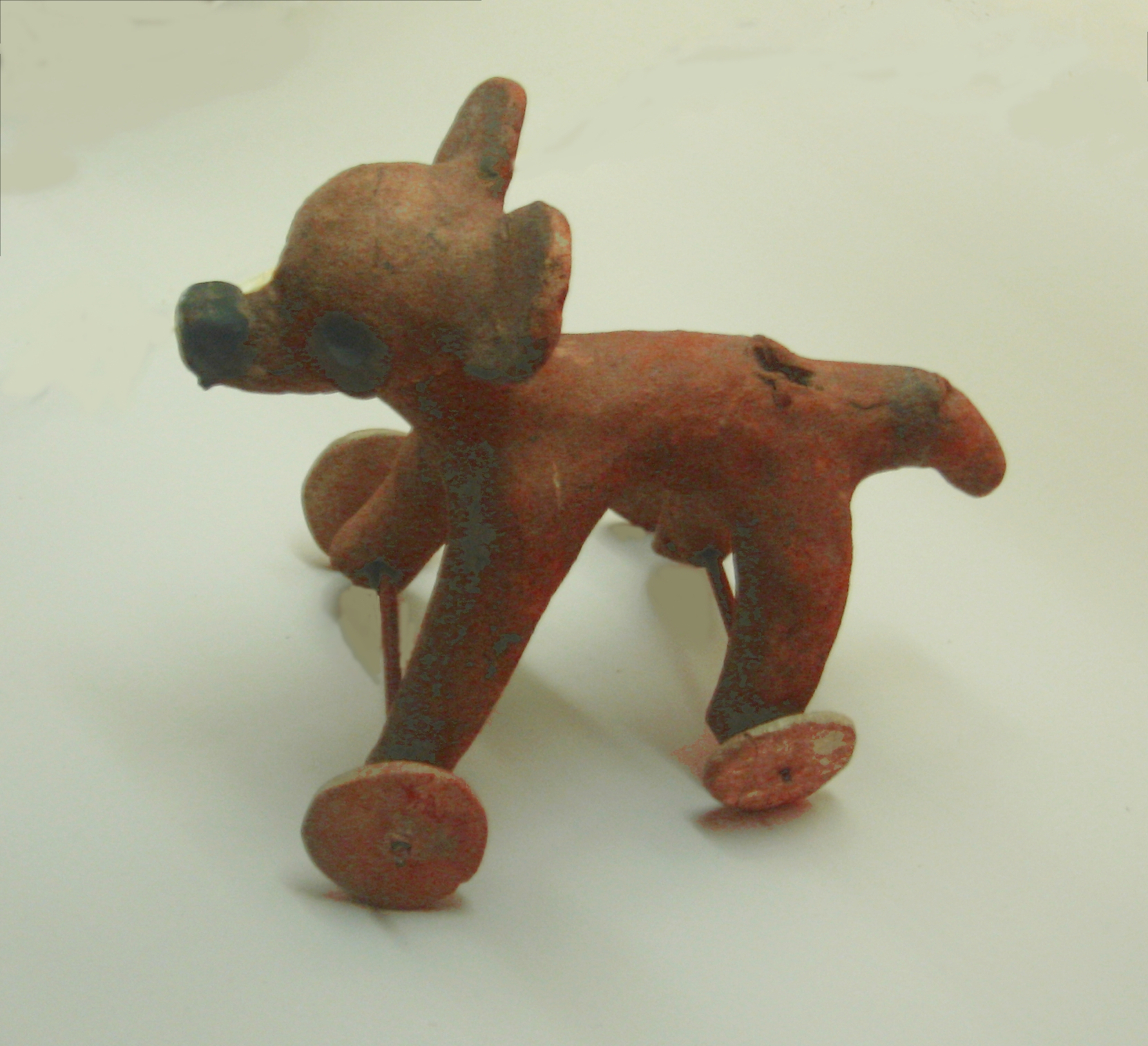
A figurine featuring the New World's independently invented wheel. Among the places where wheeled toys were found, Mesoamerica is the only one where the wheel was never put to practical use before the 16th century.

Although large-scale use of wheels did not occur in the Americas before European contact, numerous small wheeled artifacts, identified as children's toys, have been found in Mexican archeological sites, some dating to approximately 1500 BCE. Some argue that the primary obstacle to large-scale development of the wheel in the Americas was the absence of domesticated large animals that could be used to pull wheeled carriages. The closest relative of cattle in Americas in pre-Columbian times, the American bison, is difficult to domesticate and was never domesticated by Native Americans; several horse species existed until about 12,000 years ago, but ultimately became extinct. The only large animal that was domesticated in the Western hemisphere, the llama, a pack animal, was not physically suited to use as a draft animal to pull wheeled vehicles, and use of the llama did not spread far beyond the Andes by the time of the arrival of Europeans.

On the other hand, Mesoamericans never developed the wheelbarrow, the potter's wheel, nor any other practical object with a wheel or wheels. Although part of several toys, very similar to those found throughout the world and still made for children ("pull toys"), the wheel was never put into practical use in Mesoamerica before the 16th century. Possibly the closest the Mayas came to the utilitarian wheel is the spindle whorl, and some scholars believe that these toys were originally made with spindle whorls and spindle sticks as "wheels" and "axes".

Aboriginal Australians traditionally used circular discs rolled along the ground for target practice.

Nubians from after about 400 BCE used wheels for spinning pottery and as water wheels. It is thought that Nubian waterwheels may have been ox-driven. It is also known that Nubians used horse-drawn chariots imported from Egypt.

Starting from the 18th century in West Africa, wheeled vehicles were mostly used for ceremonial purposes in places like Dahomey. The wheel was barely used for transportation, except Ethiopia and Somalia in Sub-Saharan Africa well into the 19th century.

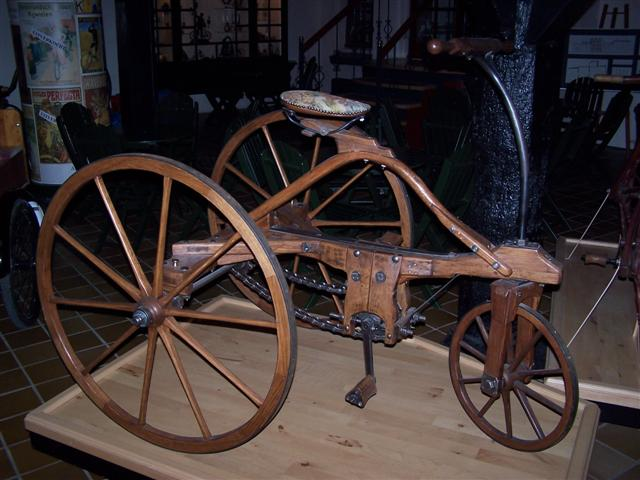
Three spoked wheels on an antique tricycle

The spoked wheel was in continued use without major modification until the 1870s, when wire-spoked wheels and pneumatic tires were invented. Pneumatic tires can greatly reduce rolling resistance and improve comfort. Wire spokes are under tension, not compression, which makes the wheel both stiff and light. Early radially spoked wire wheels gave rise to tangentially spoked wire wheels, which were widely used on cars into the late 20th century. Cast alloy wheels are more commonly used. Forged alloy wheels are used when weight is critical.

The invention of the wheel has also been important for technology in general, important applications including the water wheel, the cogwheel (see also antikythera mechanism), the spinning wheel, and the astrolabe or torquetum. More modern descendants of the wheel include the propeller, the jet engine, the flywheel (gyroscope) and the turbine.

== Mechanics and function ==
A wheeled vehicle requires much less work to move than simply dragging the same weight. The low resistance to motion is explained by the fact that the frictional work done is no longer at the surface that the vehicle is traversing, but in the bearings. In the simplest and oldest case, the bearing is just a round hole through which the axle passes (a "plain bearing"). Even with a plain bearing, the frictional work is greatly reduced because:

- The normal force at the sliding interface is the same as with simple dragging.
- The sliding distance is reduced for a given distance of travel.
- The coefficient of friction at the interface is usually lower.

Example:

- If a 100 kg object is dragged for 10 m along a surface with the coefficient of friction μ = 0.5, the normal force is 981 N and the work done (required energy) is (work=force x distance) 981 × 0.5 × 10 = 4905 joules.
- Now give the object 4 wheels. The normal force between the 4 wheels and axles is the same (in total) 981 N. Assume, for wood, μ = 0.25, and say the wheel diameter is 1000 mm and axle diameter is 50 mm. So while the object still moves 10 m, the sliding surfaces only slide over each other by 0.5 m. The work done is 981 × 0.25 × 0.5 = 123 joules; this is 1/40 of the work done in dragging.

Additional energy is lost from the wheel-to-road interface. This is termed rolling resistance, which is predominantly a loss due to deformation. It depends on the nature of the ground, the wheel material, the tire inflation level, the net torque exerted by the engine, and many other factors.

A wheel can also offer advantages when traversing irregular surfaces if its radius is sufficiently large relative to the irregularities.

The wheel alone is not a machine, but when attached to an axle in conjunction with bearing, it forms the wheel and axle, one of the simple machines. A driven wheel is an example of a wheel-and-axle. Wheels predate driven wheels by about 6000 years, themselves an evolution of the use of round logs as rollers to move heavy loads—a practice that goes back so far in prehistory that it has not been dated.

== Construction ==
=== Rim ===
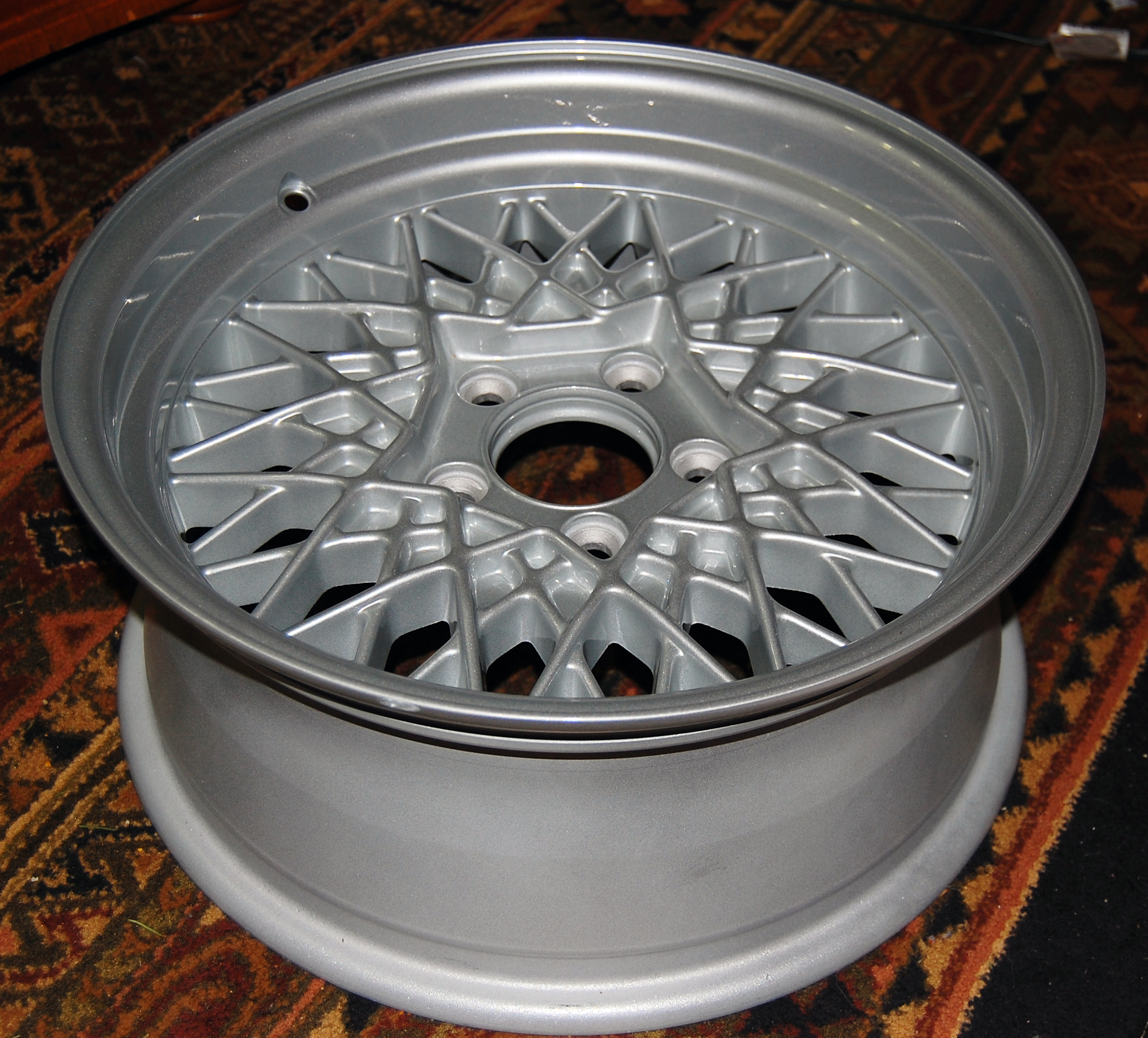
Rim of an alloy wheel

The rim is the "outer edge of a wheel, holding the tire". It makes up the outer circular design of the wheel on which the inside edge of the tire is mounted on vehicles such as automobiles. For example, on a bicycle wheel, the rim is a large hoop attached to the outer ends of the spokes of the wheel that holds the tire and tube.

In the 1st millennium BCE an iron rim was introduced around the wooden wheels of chariots.

=== Hub ===
The hub is the center of the wheel, and typically houses a bearing, and is where the spokes meet.

A hubless wheel (also known as a rim-rider or centerless wheel) is a type of wheel with no center hub. More specifically, the hub is actually almost as big as the wheel itself. The axle is hollow, following the wheel at very close tolerances.

=== Spokes ===
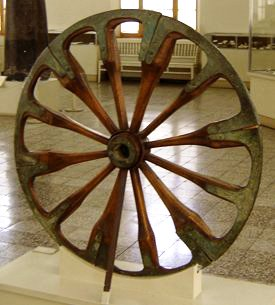
A spoked wheel on display at The National Museum of Iran, in Tehran. The wheel is dated to the late 2nd millennium BCE and was excavated at Choqa Zanbil.

A spoke is one of several rods radiating from the center of a wheel (the hub where the axle connects), connecting the hub with the round traction surface. The term originally referred to portions of a log that had been split lengthwise into four or six sections. The radial members of a wagon wheel were made by carving a spoke (from a log) into their finished shape. A spokeshave is a tool originally developed for this purpose. Eventually, the term spoke was more commonly applied to the finished product of the wheelwright's work than to the materials used.

==== Wire ====
The rims of wire wheels (or "wire spoked wheels") are connected to their hubs by wire spokes. Although these wires are generally stiffer than a typical wire rope, they function mechanically the same as tensioned flexible wires, keeping the rim true while supporting applied loads.

Wire wheels are used on most bicycles and still used on many motorcycles. They were invented by aeronautical engineer George Cayley and first used in bicycles by James Starley. A process of assembling wire wheels is described as wheelbuilding.

=== Tire/Tyre ===
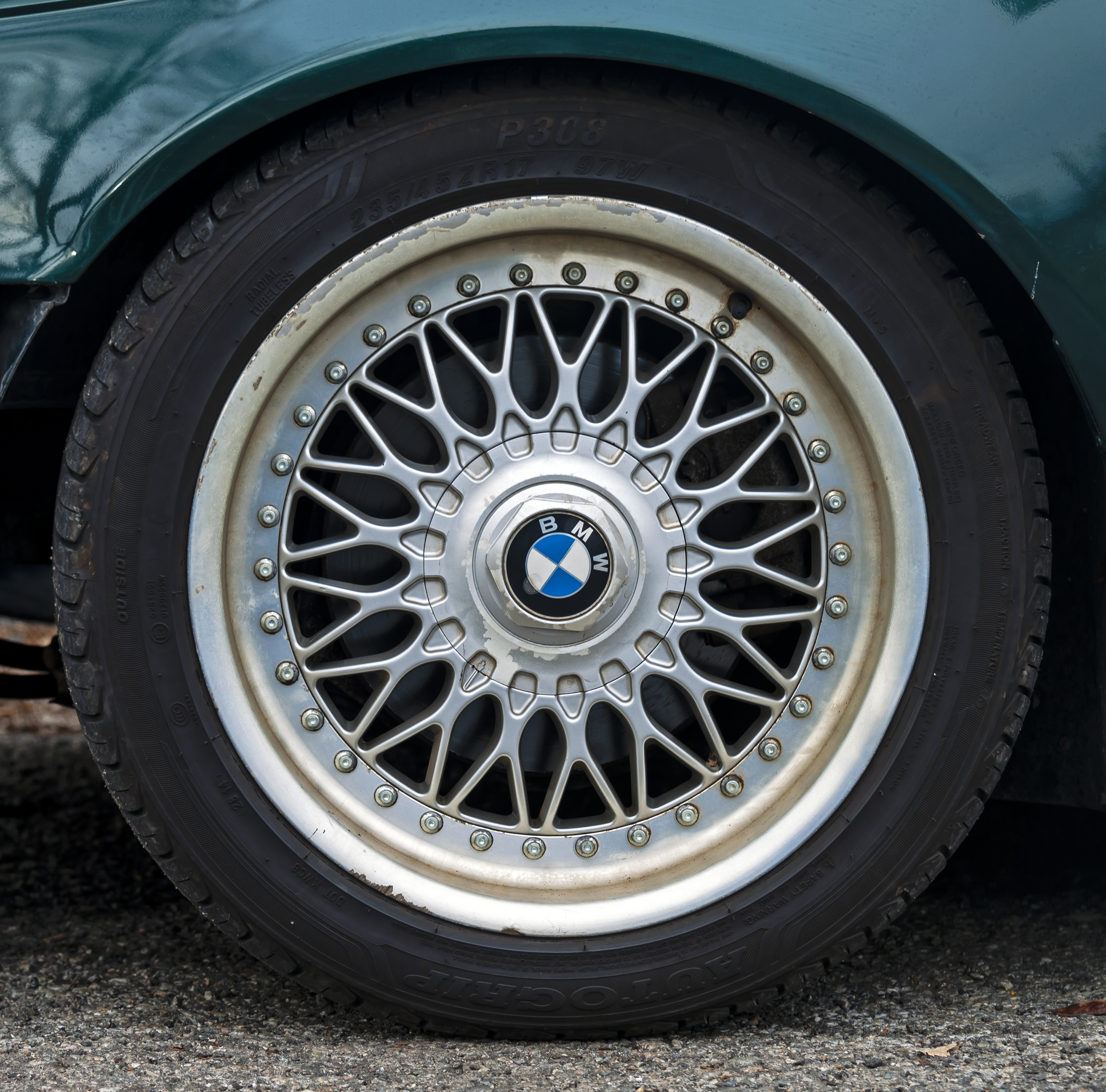
A wheel with car tire made by BMW company

A tire (in American English and Canadian English) or tyre (in some Commonwealth Nations such as UK, India, South Africa, Australia and New Zealand) is a ring-shaped covering that fits around a wheel rim to protect it and enable better vehicle performance by providing a flexible cushion that absorbs shock while keeping the wheel in close contact with the ground. The word itself may be derived from "tie", which refers to the outer steel ring of a wooden cart wheel that ties the wood segments together (see Etymology above).

The fundamental materials of modern tires are synthetic rubber, natural rubber, fabric, and wire, along with other compound chemicals. They consist of a tread and a body. The tread provides traction while the body ensures support. Before rubber was invented, the earliest versions of tires were simply metal bands that fitted around wooden wheels to prevent wear and tear. Today, the vast majority of tires are pneumatic inflatable structures, comprising a doughnut-shaped body of cords and wires encased in rubber and generally filled with compressed air to form an inflatable cushion. Pneumatic tires are used on many types of vehicles, such as cars, bicycles, motorcycles, trucks, earthmovers, and aircraft.

=== Protruding or covering attachments ===
Extreme off-road conditions have led to the development of several types of wheel covers, which may be constructed as removable attachments or permanent covers. Wheels like this are no longer necessarily round or have panels that make the ground-contact area flat.

Examples include:

- Snow chains – Specially designed chain assemblies that wrap around the tire to provide increased grip, designed for deep snow.
- Dreadnaught wheel – A type of permanently attached hinged panels for general extreme off-road use. These are not connected directly to the wheels, but to each other.
- Pedrail wheel – A system of rails that holds panels that hold the vehicle. These do not necessarily have to be built as a circle (wheel) and are thus also a form of Continuous track.
- A version of the above examples (name unknown to the writer) was commonly used on heavy artillery during World War I. Specific examples: Cannone da 149/35 A and the Big Bertha. Multiple hinges connected these panels, which could be installed over a contemporary wheel.
- Continuous track – A system of linked and hinged chains/panels that cover multiple wheels in a way that allows the vehicle's mass to be distributed across the space between wheels that are positioned in front of/behind other wheels.
- "Tire totes" – A bag designed to cover a tire to improve traction in deep snow.

Truck and bus wheels may lock up (stop rotating) under certain circumstances, such as a brake system failure. To help detect this, they sometimes feature "wheel rotation indicators": colored plastic strips attached to the rim and protruding from it so that the driver can see them in the side-view mirrors. These devices were invented and patented in 1998 by a Canadian truck shop owner.

== Alternatives ==
While wheels are very widely used for ground transport, there are alternatives, some of which are suitable for terrain where wheels are ineffective. Alternative methods for ground transport without wheels include:

- Maglev
- Sled, ski or travois
- Hovercraft and ekranoplans
- Walking pedestrian, Litter (vehicle) or a walking machine
- Horse riding
- Caterpillar tracks (operated by wheels)
- Pedrail wheels, using aspects of both wheel and caterpillar track
- Spheres, as used by Dyson vacuum cleaners and hamster balls
- Screw-propelled vehicle

== Symbolism ==
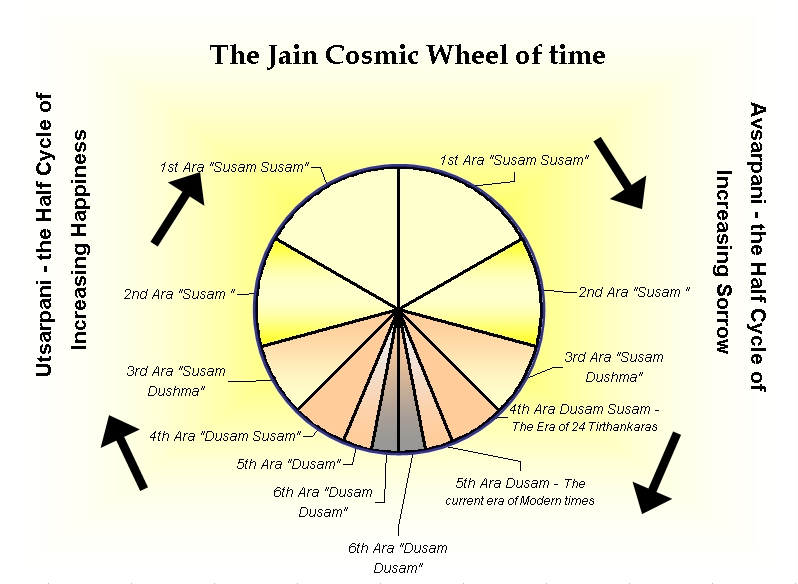
The wheel of time in Jainism.

The wheel has also become a strong cultural and spiritual metaphor for cycles and regular repetition (see chakra, reincarnation, Yin and Yang, among others). As such and because of the difficult terrain, wheeled vehicles were forbidden in old Tibet. The wheel in ancient China is seen as a symbol of health and strength and used by some villages as a tool to predict future health and success. The diameter of the wheel is an indicator of one's future health. The Kalachakra or wheel of time is also a subject in some forms of Buddhism, along with the dharmachakra.

The winged wheel is a symbol of progress, seen in many contexts including the coat of arms of Panama, the logo of the Ohio State Highway Patrol, and the State Railway of Thailand. The wheel is also the prominent figure on the flag of India. The wheel in this case represents law (dharma). It also appears in the flag of the Romani people, hinting at their nomadic history and their Indian origins.

The sixth-century monk Dorotheus of Gaza used the image of a spiked wheel to explain how the interdependent ethic of compassion worked: those who get closer to God get closer to other people, and vice versa. In medieval Europe, the Wheel of Fortune aimed to show the transitory, ephemeral, and almost illusionary character of power, in which a person that has risen to the top may go down again by the turn of the wheel.

The introduction of spoked (chariot) wheels in the Middle Bronze Age appears to have carried somewhat of a prestige. The sun cross appears to have a significance in Bronze Age religion, replacing the earlier concept of a solar barge with the more 'modern' and technologically advanced solar chariot. The wheel was also a solar symbol for the Ancient Egyptians.

In modern usage, the 'invention of the wheel' can be considered as a symbol of one of the first technologies of early civilization, alongside farming and metalwork, and thus be used as a benchmark to grade the level of societal progress.

Some Neopagans such as Wiccans have adopted the Wheel of the Year into their religious practices.

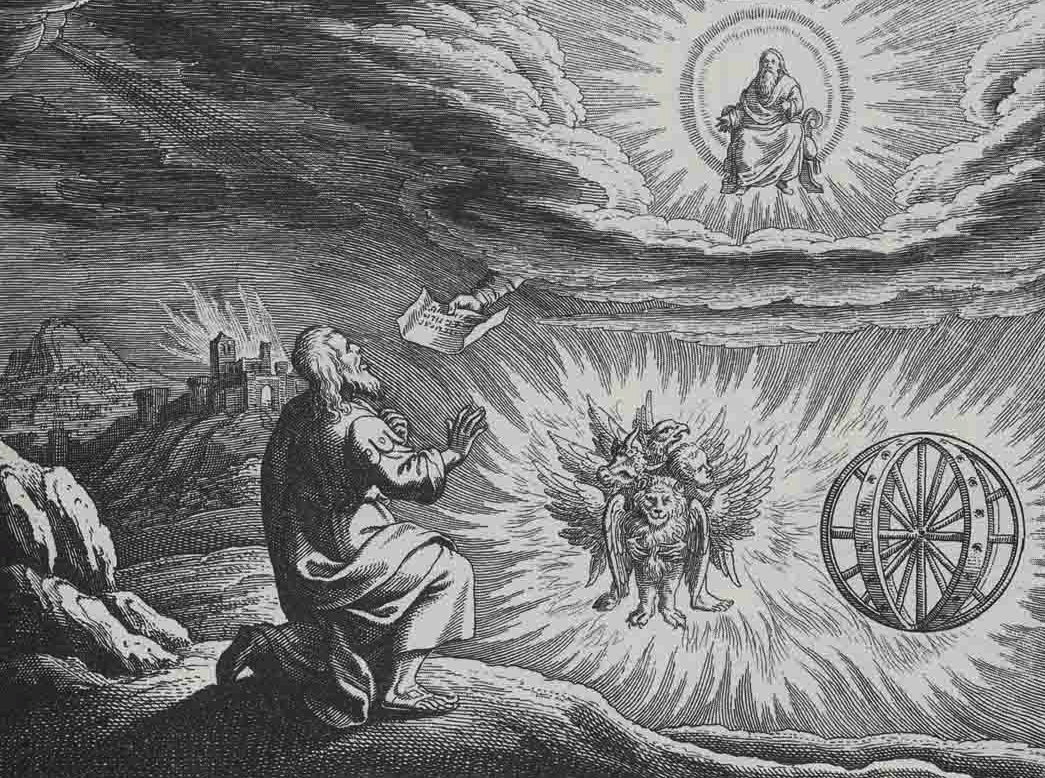
Ezekiel's "chariot vision" of Ezekiel 1, by Matthaeus Merian (1593-1650).

== See also ==
- Types: Alloy wheel, Artillery wheel, Ball transfer unit, Bicycle wheel, Caster, Cogwheel, Dreadnaught wheel, Driving wheel, Flywheel, Hubless wheel, Inline skate wheel, Mansell wheel, Mecanum wheel, Motorcycle wheel, Omni wheel, Pedrail wheel, Pressed Steel wheel, Skateboard wheel, Square wheel, Stairclimber wheel, Steering wheel (Ship's wheel), Train wheel, Tweel, Wagon wheel, Wire wheel
- Components: Axle, Bogie/Truck, Differential, Drive shaft, Drivetrain, Rim, Snow chains, Spoke, Tire, Wheelset
- Related technologies and concepts: Archimedes screw, Barrel, Breaking wheel, Color wheel, Compact disc, Ferris wheel, Pottery wheel, Propeller, Reinventing the wheel, Spindle whorl, Trackball, Wagon-wheel effect, Water wheel, Wheelbarrow, Wheelie, Wheel of Fortune, Wheelwright, Windlass, Windmill
- Alternatives: Air cushion, Continuous track, Counter-rotating screws, Leg mechanism, Magnetic levitation, Wing-in-ground-effect
- History: History of the wheel in Africa, The Horse, The Wheel and Language, Rotating locomotion in living systems, Terrestrial locomotion in animals: Rolling, Robot locomotion
- Theory: Rolling resistance, Rotational energy, Torque, Wheel and axle (simple machine), Wheel sizing
