= Robotino =

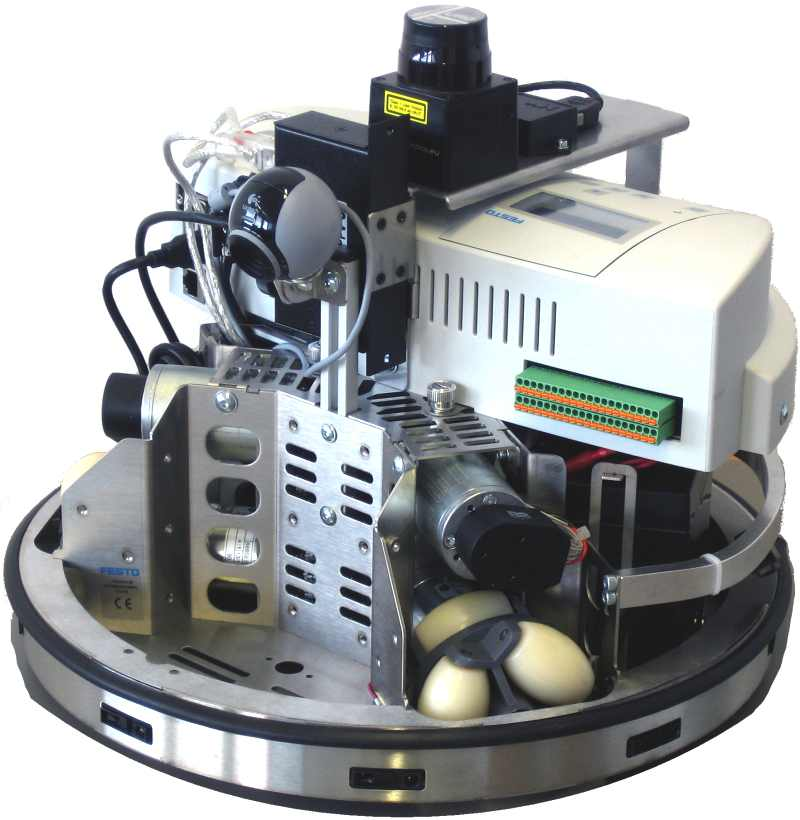
Robotino equipped with a Hokuyo URG-04LX-UG01 rangefinder

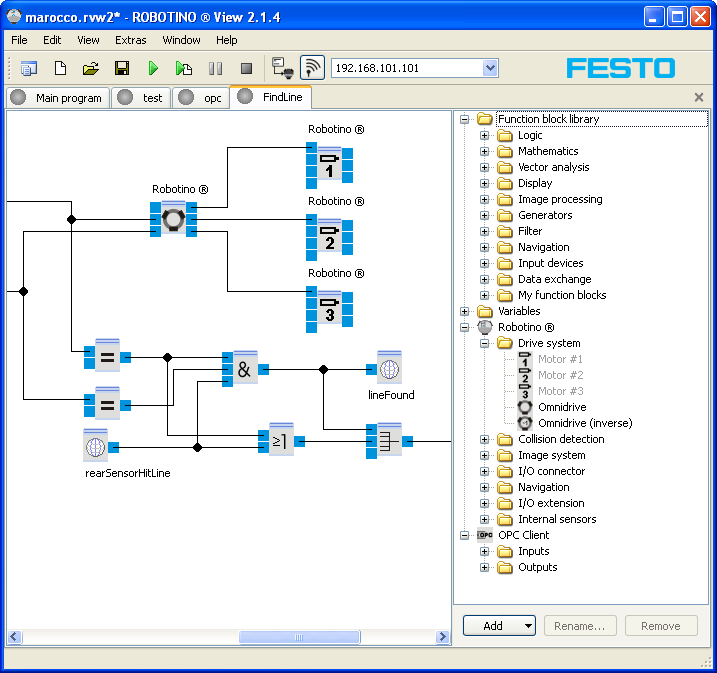
Robotino View 2 programming environment (sub program view)

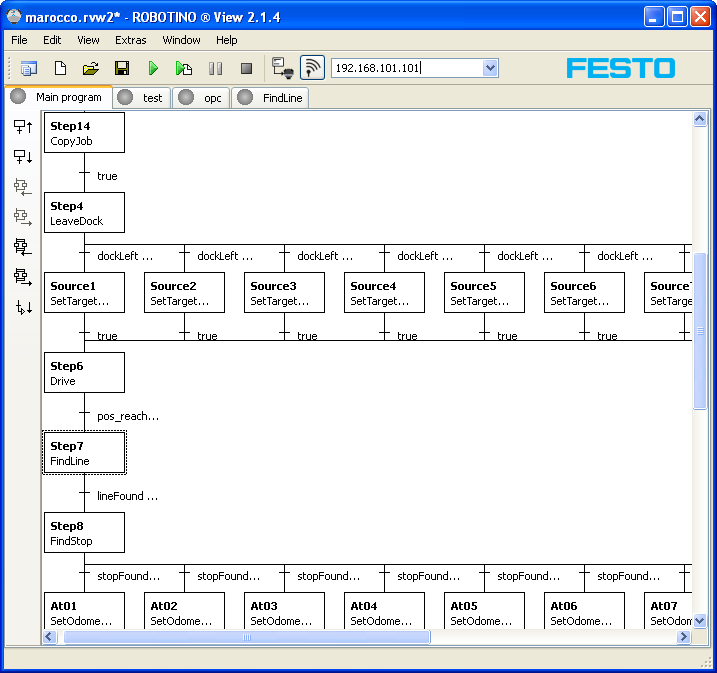
Robotino View 2 Programmierumgebung (main program view)

Robotino is a mobile robot system made by Festo Didactic, and used for educational, training and research purposes.

== Operation ==
Robotino is based on an omnidirectional drive assembly, which enables the system to roam freely. The robot is controlled by an industry-standard PC system, which is powerful enough to plan routes for fully autonomous driving. Via a WLAN-Link, Robotino can send all sensor readings to an external PC. In the other direction, control commands can be issued by the external PC. This way, control programs can run on the external PC or on Robotino directly. Mixed mode or shared control are also possible.

Robotino can be programmed in its “native” programming environment RobotinoView II, which is intended for users with little prior robotics knowledge. The robot can also be programmed in C, C++, Java, .NET, Matlab, Simulink, Labview and Microsoft Robotics Developer Studio.

== Hardware ==
The omnidirectional drive consists of three Mecanum wheels, all of which are individually controllable. These wheels are arranged at angles of 120°. Robotino has a bumper sensor around its circumference, infrared distance sensors, a color camera with VGA resolution, optical wheel encoders, power measurement for the entire system and the various motors, as well as a battery voltage monitor. Moreover, as optional additional sensors, Robotino can be equipped with a precise laser scanner, a gyroscope, and an indoor positioning system (created by Evolution Robotics). For signal input and output Robotino has several interfaces:

- USB
- Ethernet
- 8 digital and 8 analog inputs
- 8 digital outputs
- additional motor output for driving high loads
- additional encoder input

Power is supplied by two 12V/5Ah lead-acid batteries or optionally by two 12V/9Ah NiMH batteries.
