= Killough platform =

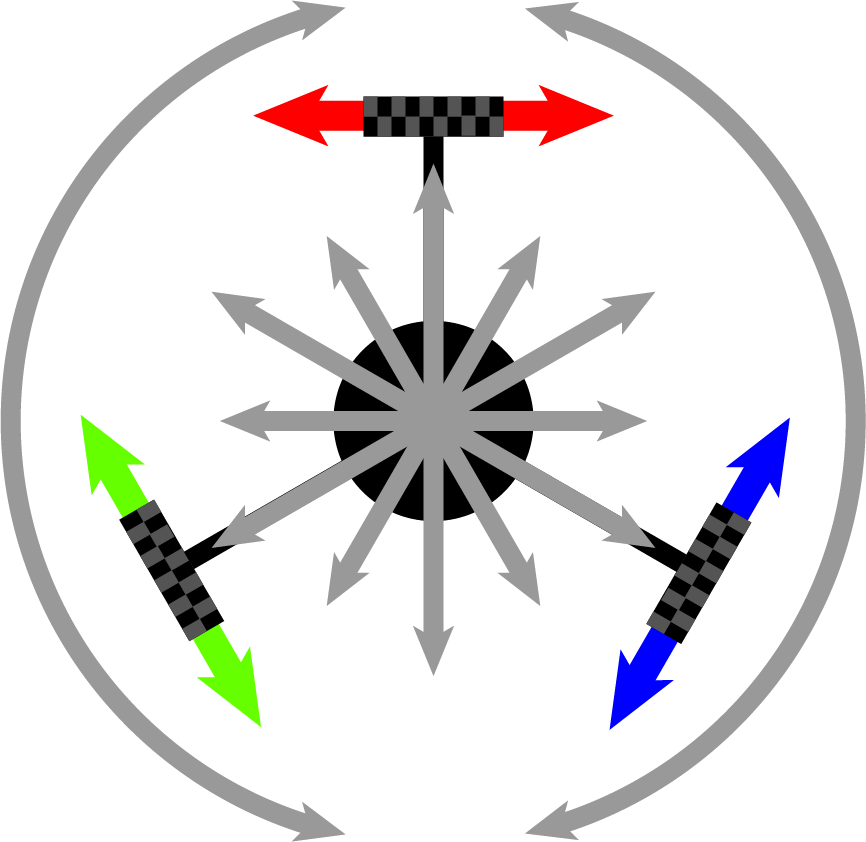
Range of movement of the Killough platform (Gray)

A Killough platform is a three-wheel drive system that uses traditional wheels to achieve omni-directional movement without the use of omni-directional wheels (such as omni wheels/Mecanum wheels). Designed by Stephen Killough, after which the platform is named, with help from Francois Pin, wanted to achieve omni-directional movement without using the complicated six motor arrangement required to achieve a controllable three caster wheel system (one motor to control wheel rotation and one motor to control pivoting of the wheel). He first looked into solutions by other inventors that used rollers on the rims larger wheels but considered them flawed in some critical way. This led to the Killough system:

Picture a round platform with three motors underneath, each governing the motion of two wheels that look like miniature balloon tires. The wheels in each pair are mounted in a cage at right angles to each other; the motor can rotate the cage so that one wheel or the other is touching the ground at any one time. By configuring the three pairs of wheels to allow the same type of motion found in three pivoting casters, and by changing the relative speeds of the motors, Killough can make his robotic platform rotate, follow a straight or curved path, and even rotate while moving forward.

— "1997 Discover Awards: Automotive & Transportation: Cleaner Than Air", Discover (July 1997)

With Francois Pin, who helped with the computer control and choreography aspects of the design, Killough and Pin readied a public demonstration in 1994. This led to a partnership with Cybertrax Innovative Technologies in 1996, which was developing a motorized wheelchair.

By combining the motion of two wheels the vehicle can move in the direction of the third, perpendicular, wheel; or, by setting the cages so that no wheel is perpendicular and rotating all the wheels in the same direction, the vehicle can rotate in place. By using the resultant motion of the vector addition of the wheels a Killough platform is able to achieve omni-directional motion.
