= Omni wheel =

Wheel that can move along multiple axes

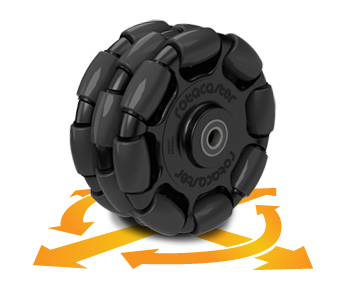
Triple Rotacaster commercial industrial omni wheel

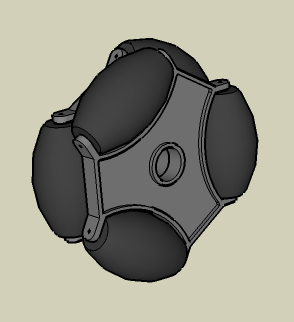
A simple omni wheel. The free rotating rollers (dark gray) allow the wheel to slide laterally

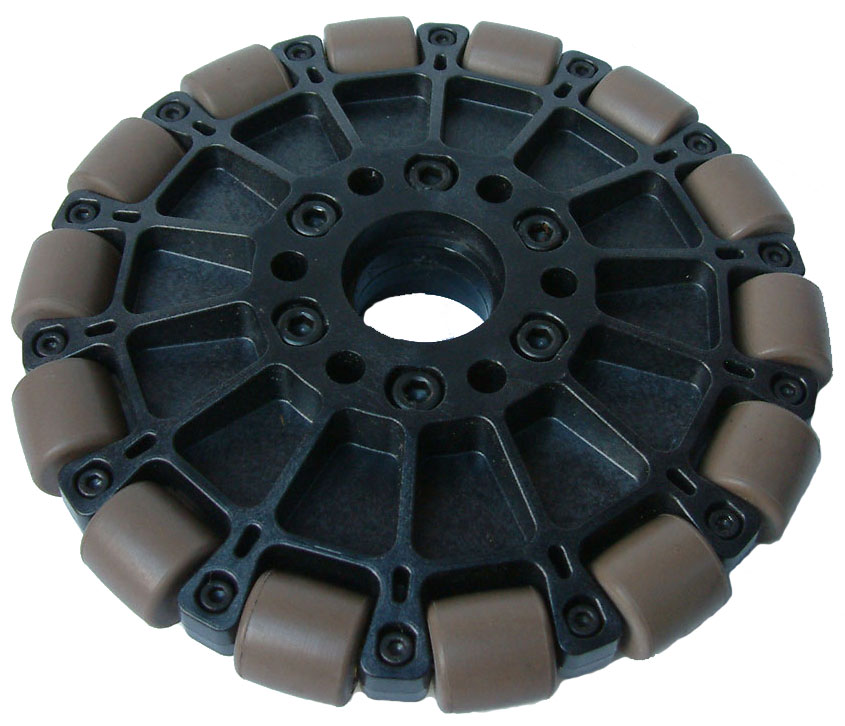
A molded plastic omni wheel

Omni wheels or poly wheels, similar to Mecanum wheels, are wheels with small discs (called rollers) around the circumference which are perpendicular to the turning direction. The effect is that the wheel can be driven with full force, but will also slide laterally with great ease. These wheels are often employed in holonomic drive systems.

A platform employing three omni wheels in a triangular configuration is generally called Kiwi Drive. The Killough platform is similar; so named after Stephen Killough's work with omnidirectional platforms at Oak Ridge National Laboratory. Killough's 1994 design used pairs of wheels mounted in cages at right angles to each other and thereby achieved holonomic movement without using true omni wheels.

They are often used in intelligent robot research for small autonomous robots. In projects such as VEX Robotics, Robocup and FIRST Robotics, many robots use these wheels to have the ability to move in all directions. Omni wheels are also sometimes employed as powered casters for differential drive robots to make turning faster. Omniwheels are often used to allow for movement on the horizontal axis on a drivetrain, as well as forward and backward movement. Usually, this is achieved by using an H-drive.

Omniwheels combined with conventional wheels provide unique performance properties, such as on a six-wheeled vehicle employing two conventional wheels on a center axle and four omniwheels on front and rear axles.

== History ==
The wheel was first patented in 1919 by J. Grabowiecki.

US patent 1305535, J. Grabowiecki, "Vehicle wheel", issued 1919-06-03

A variant of the wheel was patented by Josef F. Blumrich in 1972.

US patent 3789947, Josef F. Blumrich, "Omnidirectional wheel", issued 1974-02-05. Blumrich claimed that the design is described in the Book of Ezekiel as a component of a spacecraft created by extraterrestrial life, which is why the wheel is sometimes jokingly called the "Ezekiel wheel". The Spaceships of Ezekiel describes his process for the "discovery" and recreation of the Omni wheel as well as a traveling craft and its docking station.

A recent invention is the so-called Liddiard Wheel, which claims to be a superior omnidirectional wheel.

== Applications ==
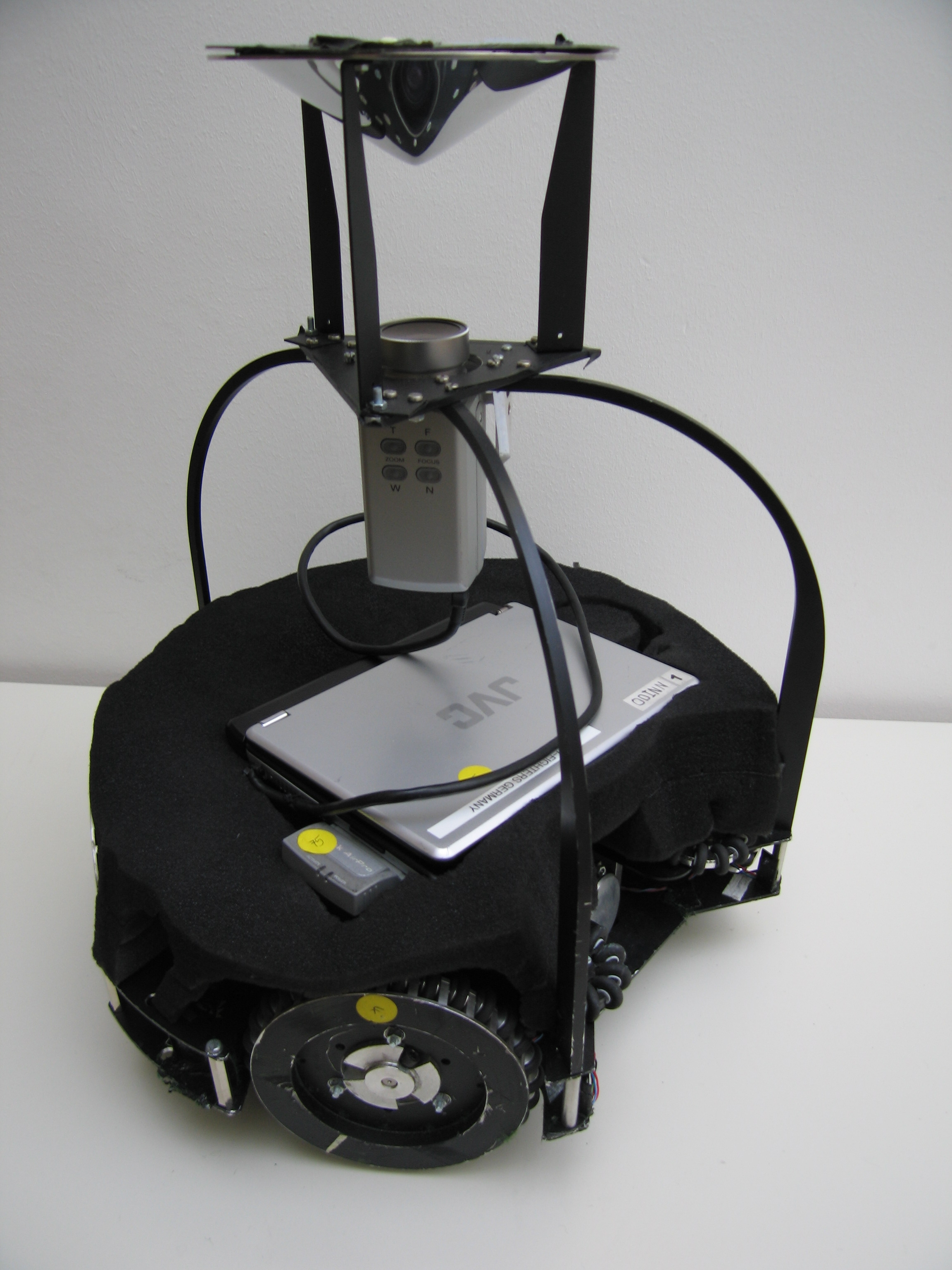
Robot soccer

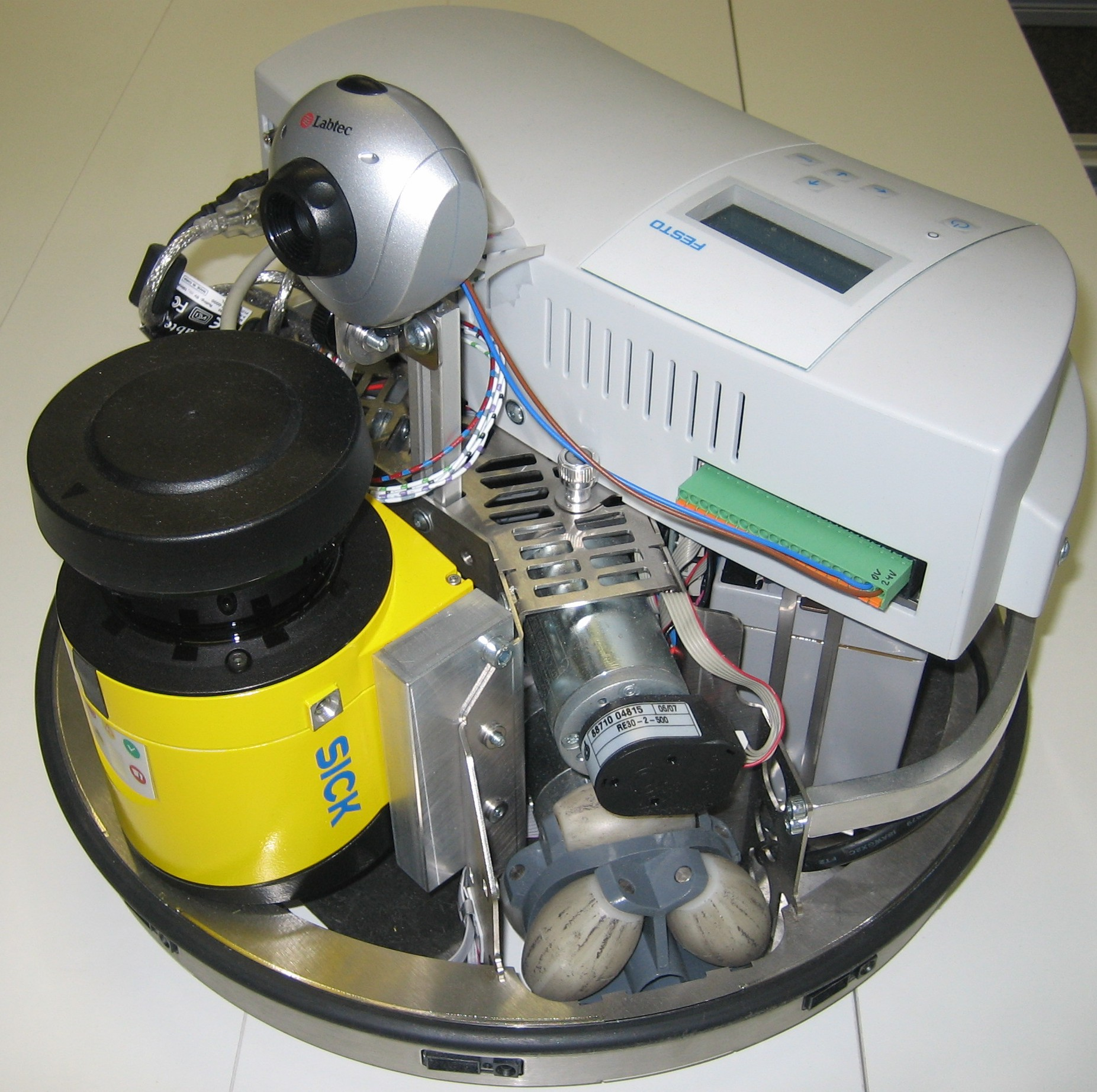
Robotino, used for educational, training and research purposes.

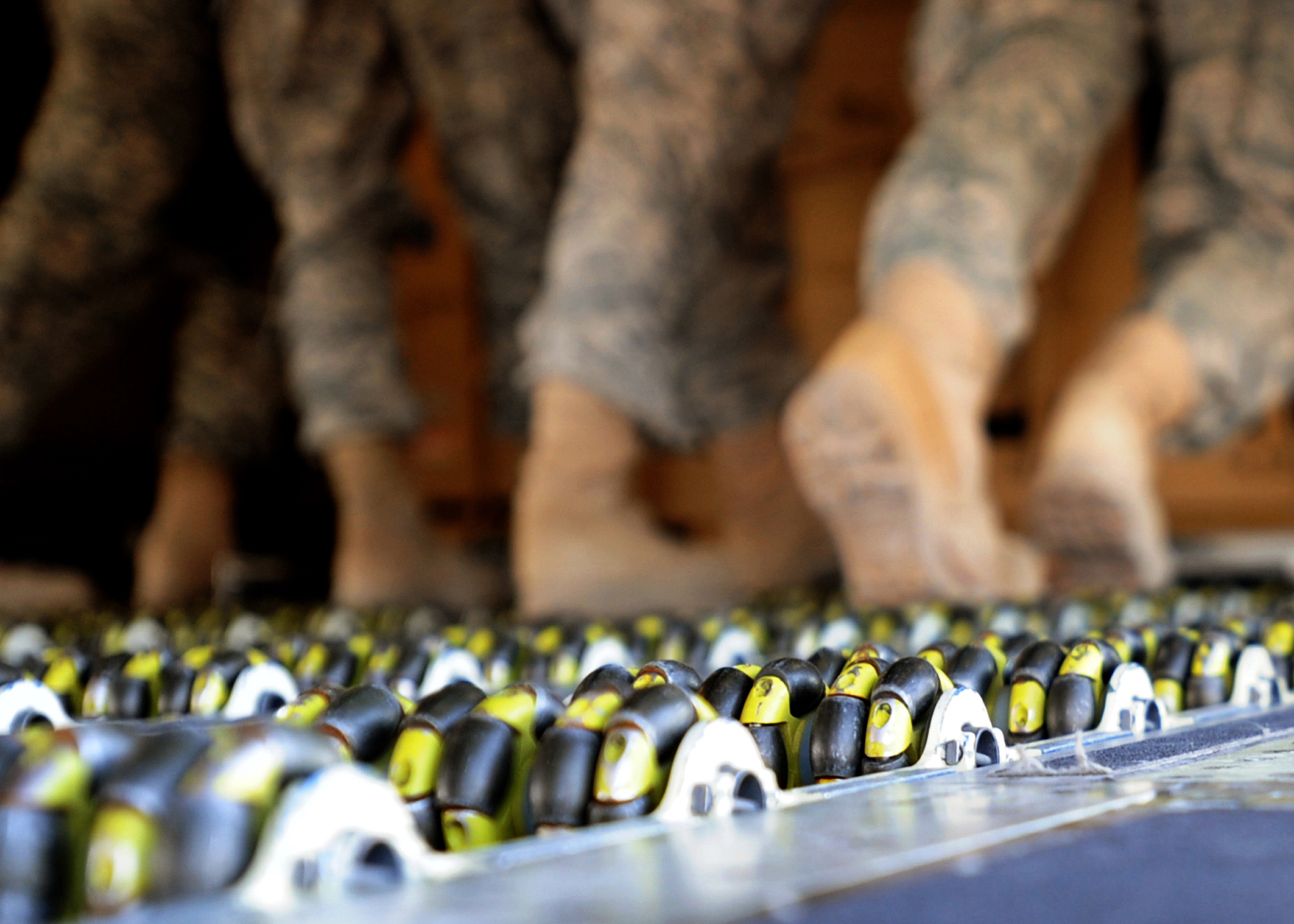
Omni wheels on the freight deck of a Boeing C-17 allows the positioning of cargo

== See also ==
- Ball transfer unit
- Mecanum wheel
