= William Liddiard =

Driver and inventor

William Liddiard is a transport truck driver based out of London. He is also at the forefront of Liddiard Wheels, an omnidirectional wheel. He invented an omni-directional tyre, which can move a vehicle sideways.
