= Ancient religion =

Ancient religion may refer to:

- Prehistoric religion
  - Paleolithic religion
  - Neolithic religion
- Bronze and Iron Age religion:
  - Religions of the ancient Near East
  - Ancient Mesopotamian religion
  - Ancient Egyptian religion
  - Historical Vedic religion
  - Ancient Greek religion
  - Religion in ancient Rome
  - Ancient Celtic religion

== See also ==
- History of religion
- Paganism
- Bronze Age religion (disambiguation)
