= Caster =

Undriven wheel that is designed to be attached to the bottom of a larger object

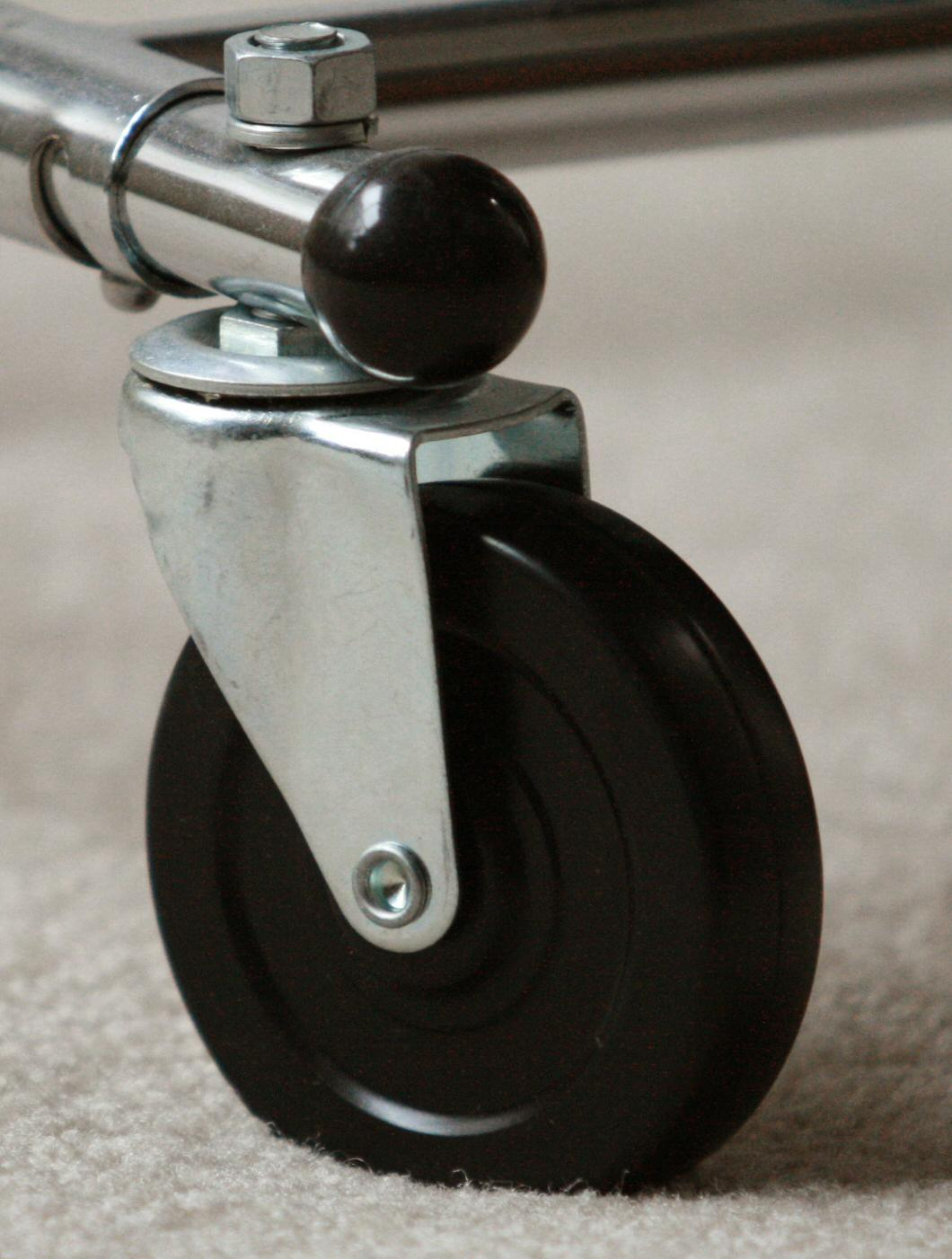
A swivel caster

A caster (or castor) is an undriven wheel that is designed to be attached to the bottom of a larger object (the "vehicle") to enable that object to be moved.

Casters are used in numerous applications, including shopping carts, office chairs, toy wagons, hospital beds, and material handling equipment. High capacity, heavy duty casters are used in many industrial applications, such as platform trucks, carts, assemblies, and tow lines in plants.

== Types ==
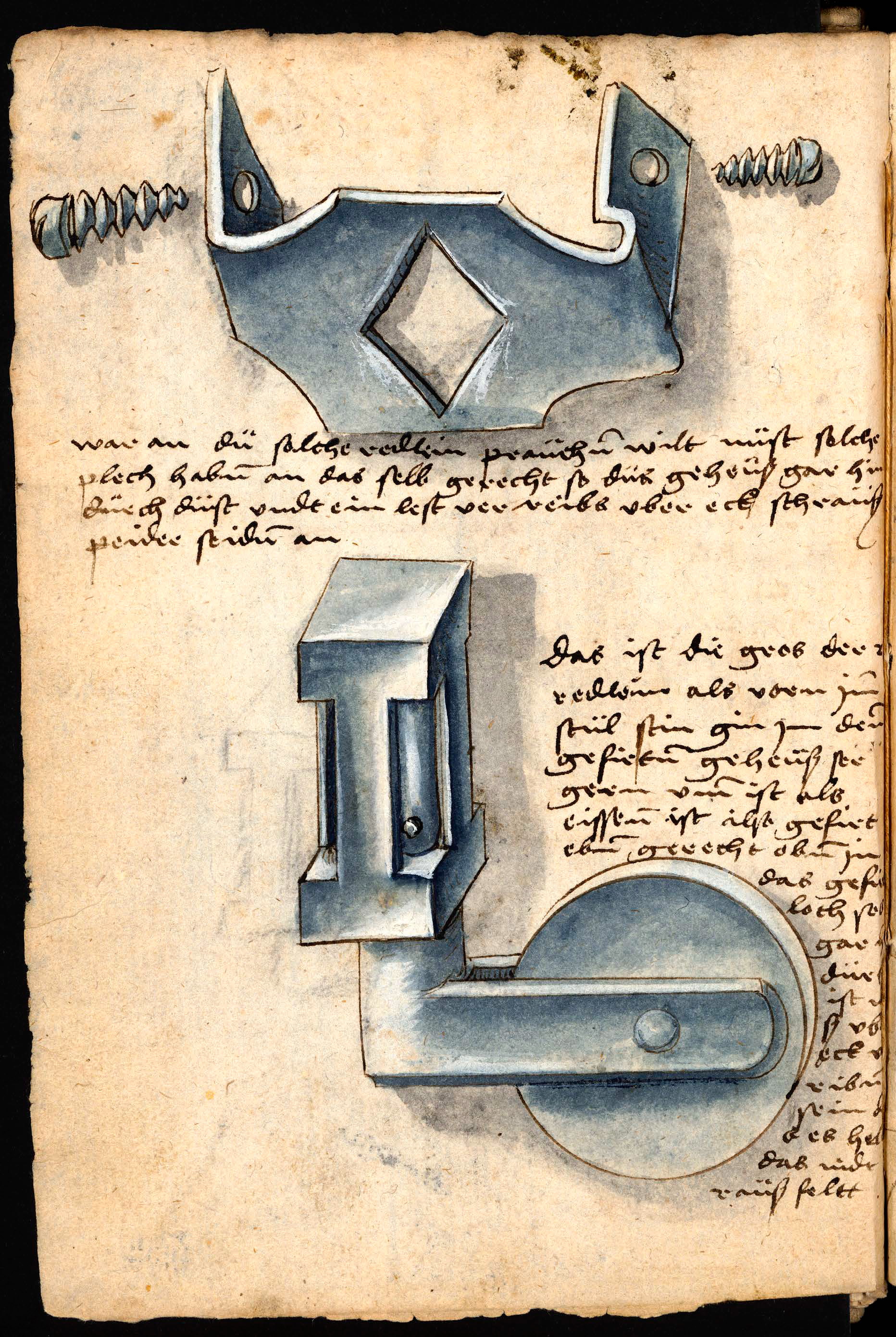
Drawing of a swivelling caster from Codex Löffelholz, Nuremberg 1505

Casters may be fixed to roll along a straight line path, or mounted on a pivot or pintle such that the wheel will automatically align itself to the direction of travel.

=== Rigid casters ===
A basic, rigid caster consists of a wheel mounted to a stationary fork. The orientation of the fork, which is fixed relative to the vehicle, is determined when the caster is mounted to the vehicle. An example of this is the wheels found at the rear of a shopping cart in North America. Rigid casters tend to restrict vehicle motion so that the vehicle travels along a straight line.

=== Swivel casters ===
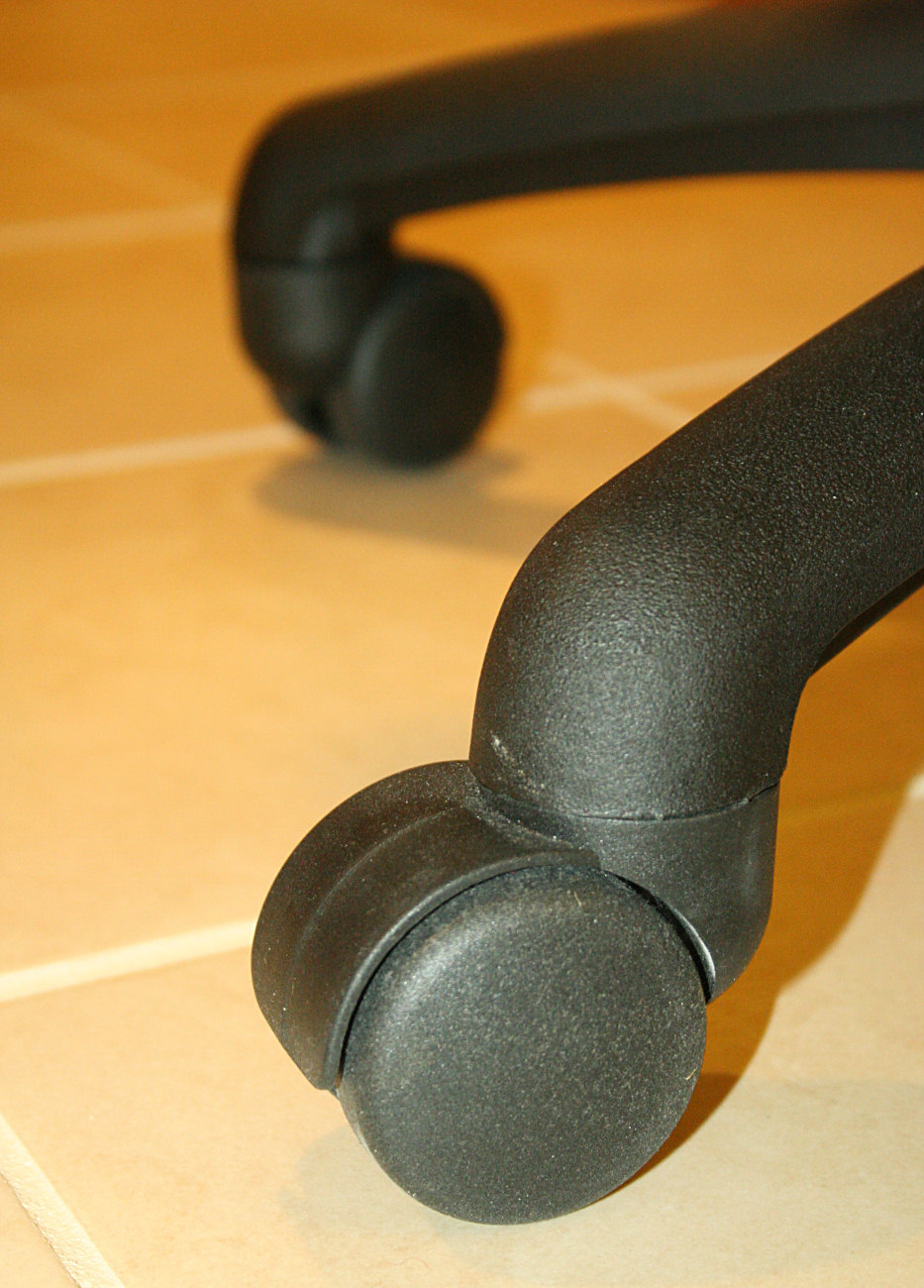
Two wheeled swivel casters on a desk chair (no fork)

Like the simpler rigid caster, a swivel caster incorporates a wheel mounted to a fork, but an additional swivel joint above the fork allows the fork to freely rotate about 360°, thus enabling the wheel to roll in any direction. This makes it possible to easily move the vehicle in any direction without changing its orientation. Swivel casters are sometimes attached to handles so that an operator can manually set their orientation. The improved swivel caster was invented in 1920 by Seibert Chesnutt, US Patent 1341630, which was easily manufactured by stamping, and incorporated ball bearings for longer life. Basic swivel casters were in evidence in Charles Darwin's famous "office chair" as early as the 1840s.

Additionally, a swivel caster typically must include a small amount of offset distance between the center axis of the vertical shaft and the center axis of the caster wheel. When the caster is moved and the wheel is not facing the correct direction, the offset will cause the wheel assembly to rotate around the axis of the vertical shaft to follow behind the direction of movement. If there is no offset, the wheel will not rotate if not facing the correct direction, either preventing motion or dragging across the ground.

When in motion along a straight line, a swivel caster will tend to automatically align to, and rotate parallel to the direction of travel. This can be seen on a shopping cart when the front casters align parallel to the rear casters when traveling down an aisle. A consequence of this is that the vehicle naturally tends to travel in a straight direction. Precise steering is not required because the casters tend to maintain straight motion. This is also true during vehicle turns. The caster rotates perpendicular to the turning radius and provides a smooth turn. This can be seen on a shopping cart as the front wheels rotate at different velocities, with different turning radius depending on how tight a turn is made.

The angle of, and distance between the wheel axles and swivel joint can be adjusted for different types of caster performance.

=== Industrial casters ===
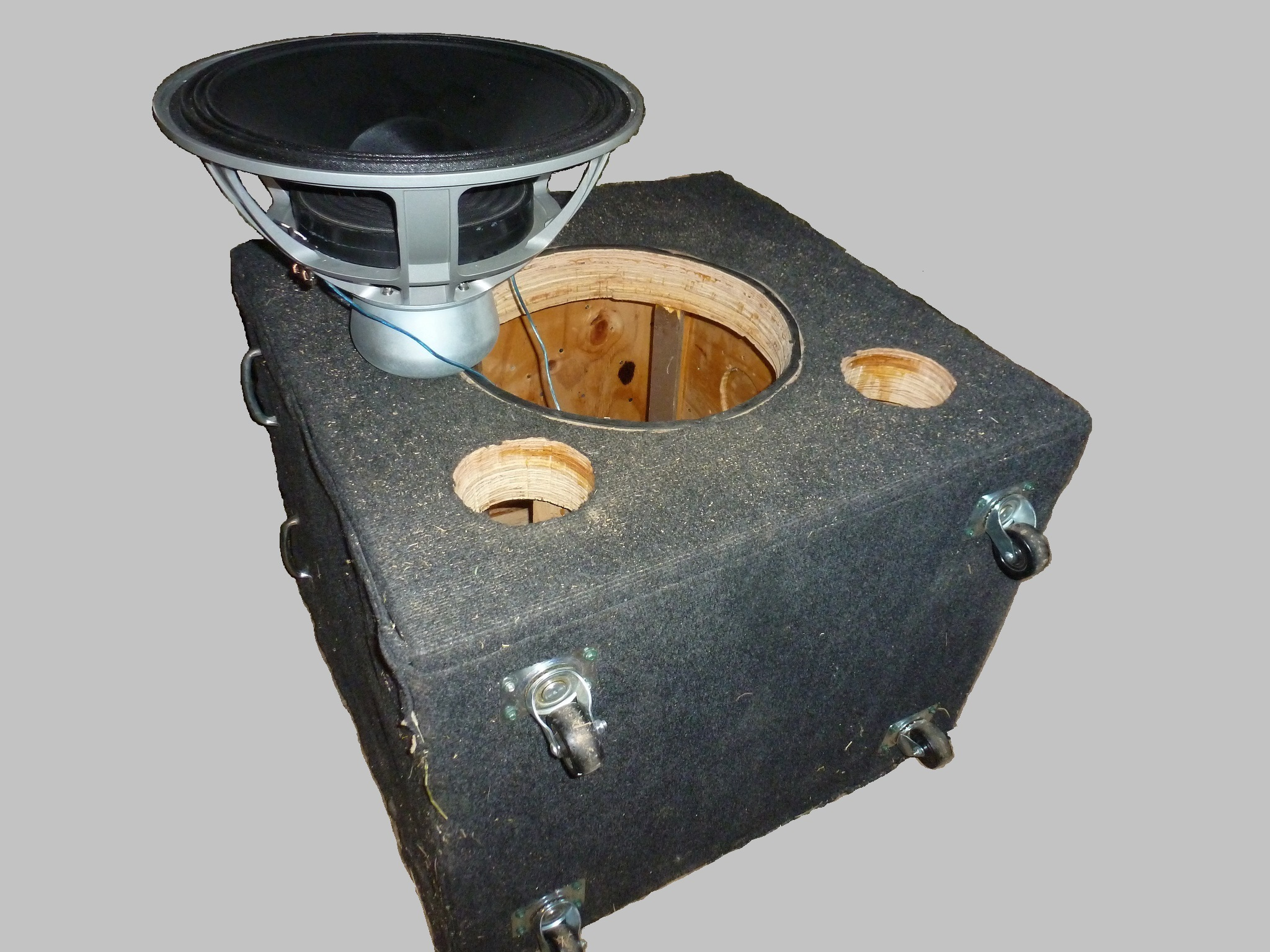
Four heavy duty casters on a large subwoofer whose weight can exceed 500 pounds (230 kg) depending on driver and top loading, and must be able to withstand rough handling.

Industrial casters are heavy duty casters that are designed to carry heavy loads, in some cases up to thirty thousand pounds. An Industrial caster may have either a swivel or rigid caster design. Industrial casters typically have a flat top plate that has four bolt holes to ensure a sturdy connection between the top plate and the load. They are used in a variety of applications including dolly carts, assembly turntables, heavy duty storage racks, holding bins, tow lines, maintenance equipment, and material handling mechanisms.

In early manufacturing, industrial caster bodies were typically fabricated from three separate, stamped metal parts, which were welded to the top plate. Today, many industrial caster bodies are made by laser cutting the body from a single metal blank and then using a press brake to shape the legs to the required ninety degree angle, thus producing a mechanically stronger device.

Various factors affect industrial caster performance. For example, larger wheel diameters and widths provide higher weight capacity by distributing the load's weight across a larger wheel surface area. Also, harder wheel materials (e.g., cast iron, high profile polyurethane) are less sensitive to and tend to not track dirt and debris on floors.

=== Braking and locking casters ===
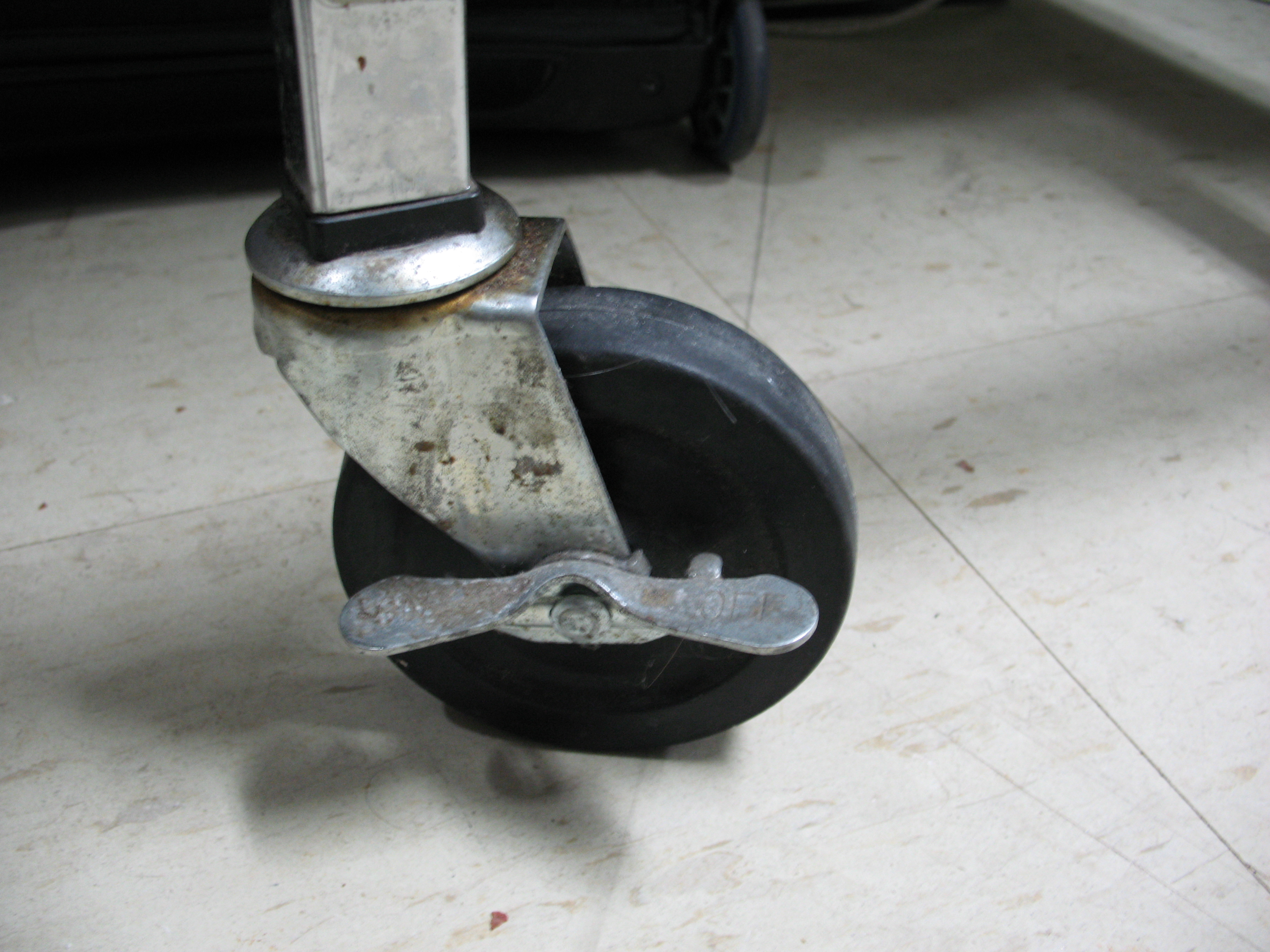
A swivel caster with a wheel lock. The vertical swivel on this type of caster cannot be locked in position.

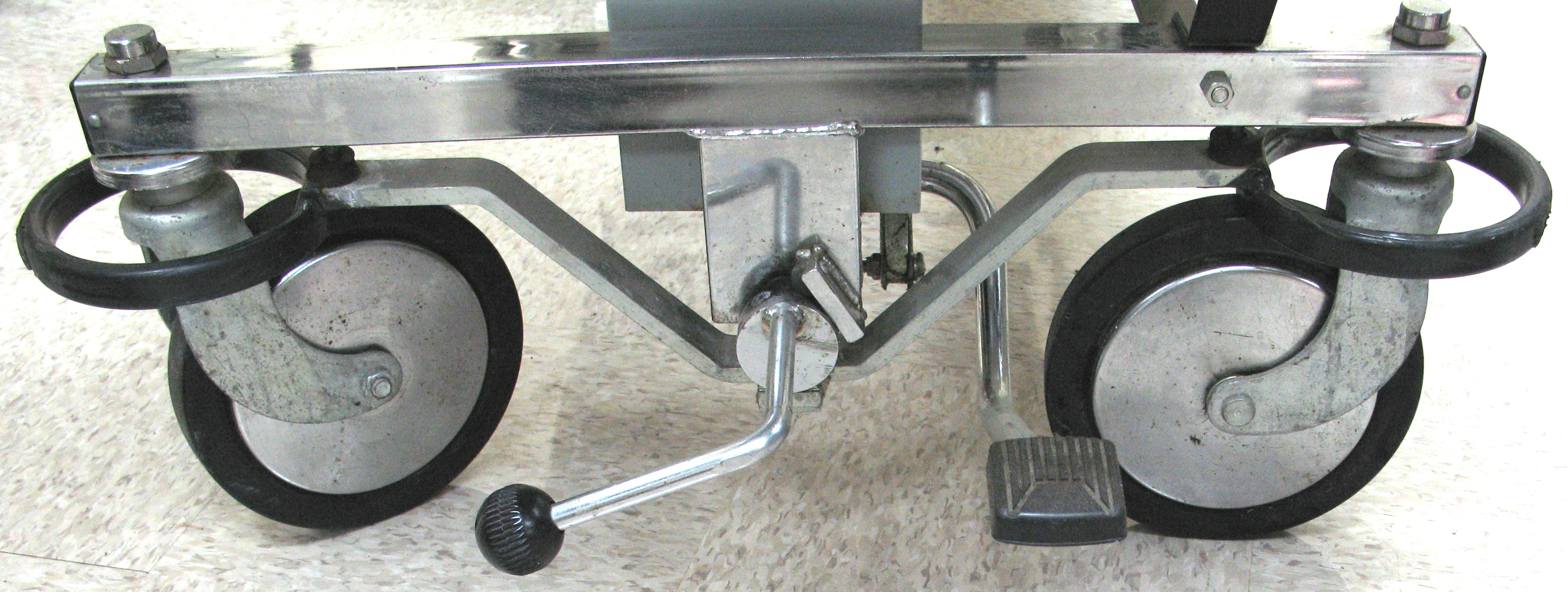
Caster central locking mechanism on an old Stryker hydraulic stretcher. Shown in the locked position with the center cam rotated downward.

Common inexpensive casters may include a brake feature, which prevents the wheel from turning. This is commonly achieved using a lever that presses a brake cam against the wheel. However, such a caster is still able to move around slightly, in a small circle whose radius is the, offset distance between the vertical shaft and the center of the locked wheel.

A more complex type of swivel caster, sometimes called a total lock caster, has an additional rotational lock on the vertical shaft so that neither shaft swiveling nor wheel rotation can occur, thus providing very rigid support. It is sometimes possible to use these two locks together or separately. If the vertical shaft is locked but the wheel can still turn, the caster becomes a directional caster, which may be locked to roll in one direction along an arbitrary horizontal axis.

In some cases it is useful to be able to brake or lock all casters at the same time, without having to walk around to individually engage a mechanism on each one. This may be accomplished using a central lock mechanism engaged by a rigid ring encircling each swivel caster, slightly above the wheel, that lowers and presses down on the wheel, preventing both wheel and swivel rotation. An alternative method is the central lock caster, which has a rotating cam in the center of each vertical caster shaft, leading down to a braking mechanism in the bottom of each caster.

=== Kingpinless casters ===
A Kingpinless caster has an inner raceway, an outer raceway which is attached to the vehicle, and ball bearings between the raceways. This mechanism has no kingpin, hence the name kingpinless. The absence of a kingpin eliminates most causes of swivel caster failure and reduces or eliminates shimmy after use. They offer capacity and durability comparable to units having sealed precision ball or tapered bearings, and are a practical alternative to traditional swivel casters in high-impact situations.

== Caster flutter ==
One major disadvantage of casters is flutter. A common example of caster flutter is on a supermarket shopping cart, when one caster rapidly swings side-to-side. This oscillation, which is also known as shimmy, occurs naturally at certain speeds, and is similar to speed wobble that occurs in other wheeled vehicles. The speed at which caster flutter occurs is based on the weight borne by the caster and the distance between the wheel axle and steering axis. This distance is known as trailing distance, and increasing this distance can eliminate flutter at moderate speeds. Generally, flutter occurs at high speeds.

What makes flutter dangerous is that it can cause a vehicle to suddenly move in an unwanted direction. Flutter occurs when the caster is not in full contact with the ground and therefore its orientation is uncontrollable. As the caster regains full contact with the ground, it can be in any orientation. This can cause the vehicle to suddenly move in the direction that the caster is pointed. At slower speeds, the caster’s ability to swivel can correct the direction and can continue travel in the desired direction. But at high speeds this can be dangerous as the wheel may not be able to swivel quickly enough and the vehicle may lurch in any direction.

Electric and racing wheelchair designers are very concerned with flutter because the chair must be safe for riders. Increasing trailing distance can increase stability at higher speeds for wheelchair racing, but may create flutter at lower speeds for everyday use. Unfortunately, the more trail the caster has, the more space the caster requires to swivel. Therefore, in order to accommodate this extra swivel space, lengthening of frame or extending the footrests may be required. This tends to make the chair more cumbersome.

Caster flutter can be controlled by adding dampers or increasing the friction of the swivel joints. This can be accomplished by adding washers to the swivel joint. The friction increases as the weight on the front of the chair increases. Anytime the caster begins to flutter, it slows the chair and shifts weight to the front wheels. There are several online anti-flutter kits for retrofitting wheelchair casters in this manner. Other methods of reducing caster flutter include increasing swivel lead, using heavier grease, reducing the mass of the wheel, or increasing friction with the ground by changing materials.

Casters are also stopped completely using caster cups.

== Ergonomic designs ==
Ergonomic casters are designed with consideration for the operating environment and the task to be performed so that any injurious effects on the operator are minimized. Long-term repetitive actions involving resisting casters can contribute to strain injuries. Improper specifications can also contribute to reduced service life of casters.

Many parameters play a role in how well the caster performs. Parameters such as tire hardness, tread width and shape, the length of the trailing offset (the 'caster') and wheel diameter all affect the effort required to start the platform moving. Harder wheels will make the caster easier to roll by reducing deformation resistance. A less inflated tire offers more deformation resistance and thus more effort is required to move the attached platform. Turning effort is affected by the amount of caster and by the wheel diameter.

Enhancements to traditional caster design include toe guards, track wipers, reinforced legs, steering tubes, swivel locks and brakes, all implemented in an effort to reduce operator injuries in the workplace.

== Wheel diameter, wheel width, and tandem wheels ==
The diameter of a caster wheel affects how easily the caster moves over particulate, rough or irregular surfaces. Large diameter caster wheels are able to bridge gaps like that between the floor and an elevator car. However, the larger the diameter of a caster wheel, the higher the caster support arm must be. Either the base of a low-hanging object must be lifted higher above the wheels, or the casters must hang out to the sides straddling the low-hanging supported object. While rotating around the vertical shaft, swivel caster wheels sweep out a space. Larger wheels require more of this space.

Load capacity may be increased by using wider wheels with more ground contact area. However, when rotating a wide swivel caster in-place, the center part of the wheel-to-ground contact patch rotates slower than the regions further out to the sides. This difference in rotation speed across the base of the wheel contact patch causes wide wheels to resist rotation around the swivel, and this resistance increases as weight loading increases.

An alternative way to increase load capacity while limiting swivel-rotation resistance is to use multiple narrow wheels in tandem on the same wheel axis. Each wheel has a comparatively narrower ground contact patch than a single wide wheel, so there is less resistance to turning in place on the swivel.

== Other types of wheels ==
Other types of wheels include:

- A standard wheel has a center rotating hub (or bearing) and a compliant material on its outer side.
- An omnidirectional wheel (Mecanum wheel, Omni wheel, or Swedish wheel) is made of a large central hub with many additional smaller wheels mounted along the perimeter such that their axes are perpendicular to the central wheel. The central wheel can rotate around its axis like traditional wheels, but the smaller wheels can also enable movement perpendicular to the central axis.
- A spherical wheel is omnidirectional and is generally a spherical ball mounted inside a restraining fixture. An example is a ball transfer unit.

== See also ==
- Caster angle
- Caster board
- Bogie
- Office chair
