= Hokuyo Automatic Co., Ltd. =

Japanese technology firm

- Industry: Industrial sensors
- Founded: 1946; 80 years ago
- Headquarters: Osaka, Japan
- Number of employees: 175
- Website: www.hokuyo-aut.jp

Hokuyo Automatic Co., Ltd. (Japanese: 北陽電機株式会社) is a global manufacturer of sensor and automation technology headquartered in Osaka, Japan.

Hokuyo is known for its 2D and 3D scanning laser range finders for use in AGV, UAV, and mobile robot applications. The company also develops photoelectric switches, optical data transceivers, automatic counters, and automatic doors, primarily for use in factory and logistics automation.
