= Bronze Age religion =

Bronze Age religion may refer to:

- Religions of the ancient Near East
  - Sumerian religion
  - Assyro-Babylonian religion
  - Canaanite religion
  - Ancient Egyptian religion
  - Minoan religion
  - Hittite religion
- Mycenaean religion
- Judaism
- Hinduism, in particular Historical Vedic religion (the late Bronze Age to early Iron Age in India)
- Reconstructed (Eneolithic to Early Bronze Age) Proto-Indo-European religion
- Reconstructed Proto-Indo-Iranian religion

== See also ==
- Prehistoric religion
- Ancient religion (disambiguation)
