= Ball transfer unit =

Omnidirectional bearing

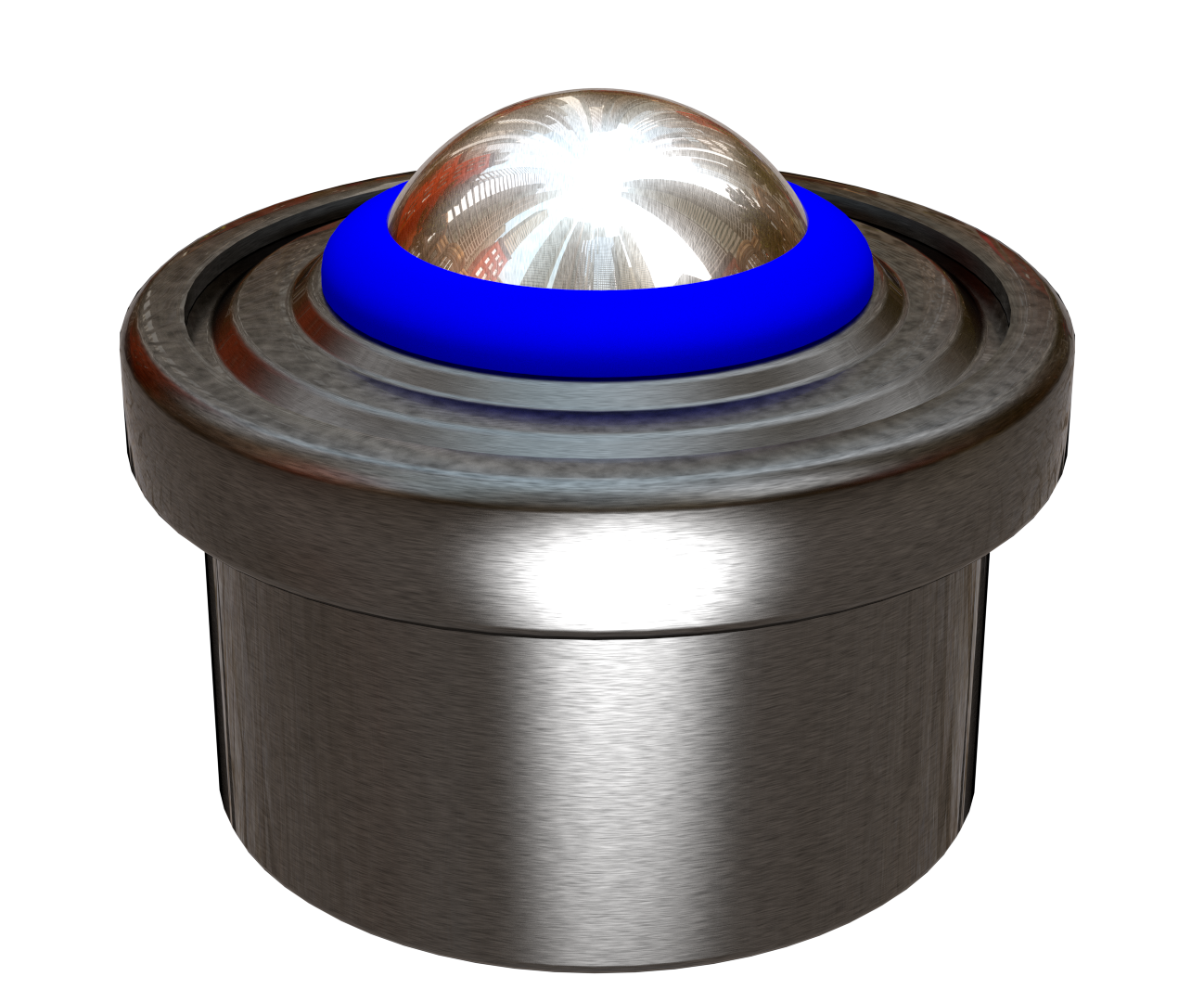
Ball transfer unit

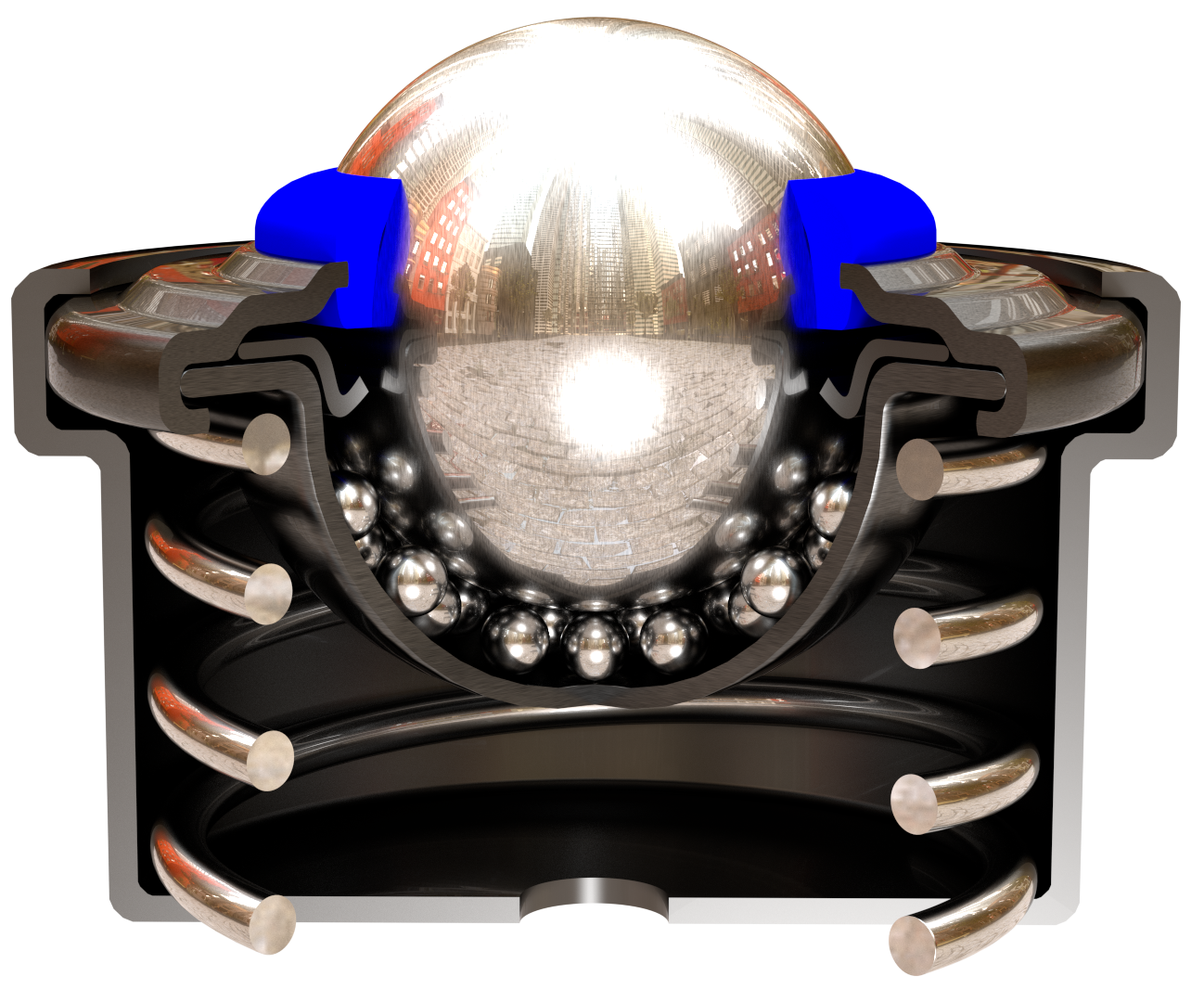
Cross-section through a spring-loaded ball transfer unit with a polymer seal ring and a drain hole in the bottom.

A ball transfer unit is an omnidirectional load-bearing sphere mounted inside a restraining fixture. They are identical in principle to a computer trackball (pointing device). Typically the design involves a single large ball supported by smaller ball bearings.

They are commonly used in an inverted ball up position where objects are quickly moved across an array of units, known as a ball transfer table, a type of conveyor system. This permits manual transfer to and from machines and between different sections of another conveyor system. They are used in airports for luggage delivery, or in industry as part of manufacturing systems. Prior to the invention of the ball transfer unit, first patented by Autoset Production Ltd in 1958, these applications were solved by the use of inverted casters. However, casters recognise a trail, meaning that the wheels had to align before directional change could be achieved.

Ball transfer units can also be used in a non-inverted ball down position as a type of caster, but this use is restricted by load-bearing limitations and the type of floor. Manufacturers have addressed this problem with ball transfer units incorporating recirculating ball principles, however the inverted position is still the most common application and the least problematic.

== See also ==
- Mecanum wheel – Type of omnidirectional wheel
- Omni wheel – Wheel that can move along multiple axes
