= Mecanum wheel =

Type of omnidirectional wheel

Movements to any directions: blue: wheel drive direction; red: vehicle moving direction. a) Moving straight ahead, b) Moving sideways, c) Moving diagonally, d) Moving around a bend, e) Rotation, f) Rotation around the central point of one axle

A Mecanum wheel is an omnidirectional wheel design for a land-based vehicle to move in any direction. It is sometimes called the Swedish wheel or Ilon wheel after its inventor, Bengt Erland Ilon (1923–2008), who conceived of the concept while working as an engineer with the Swedish company Mecanum AB, and patented it in the United States on November 13, 1972.

It consists of a series of rubberized external rollers set at a 45° angle to the wheel. Each wheel is independently-driven, and the direction of travel is dependent on the interaction between the directions each wheel is driven in relation to the others.

Uses include forklifts which require very tight maneuvering, autonomous robots, and wheelchairs.

== Design ==
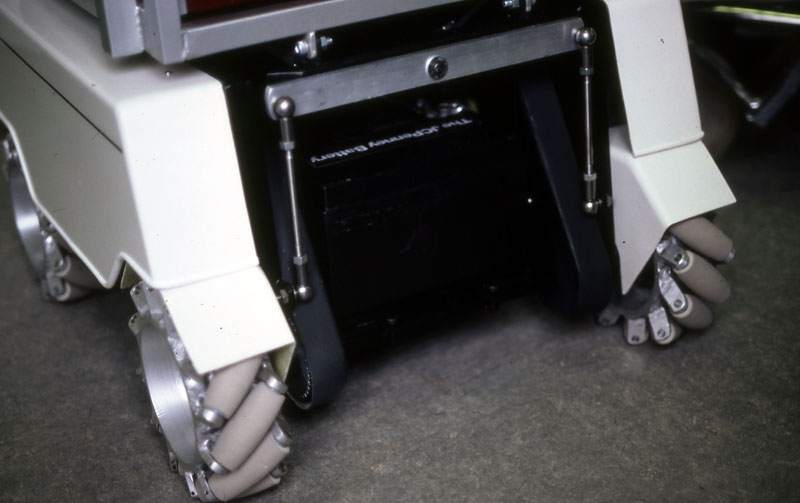
A wheelchair using Mecanum wheels

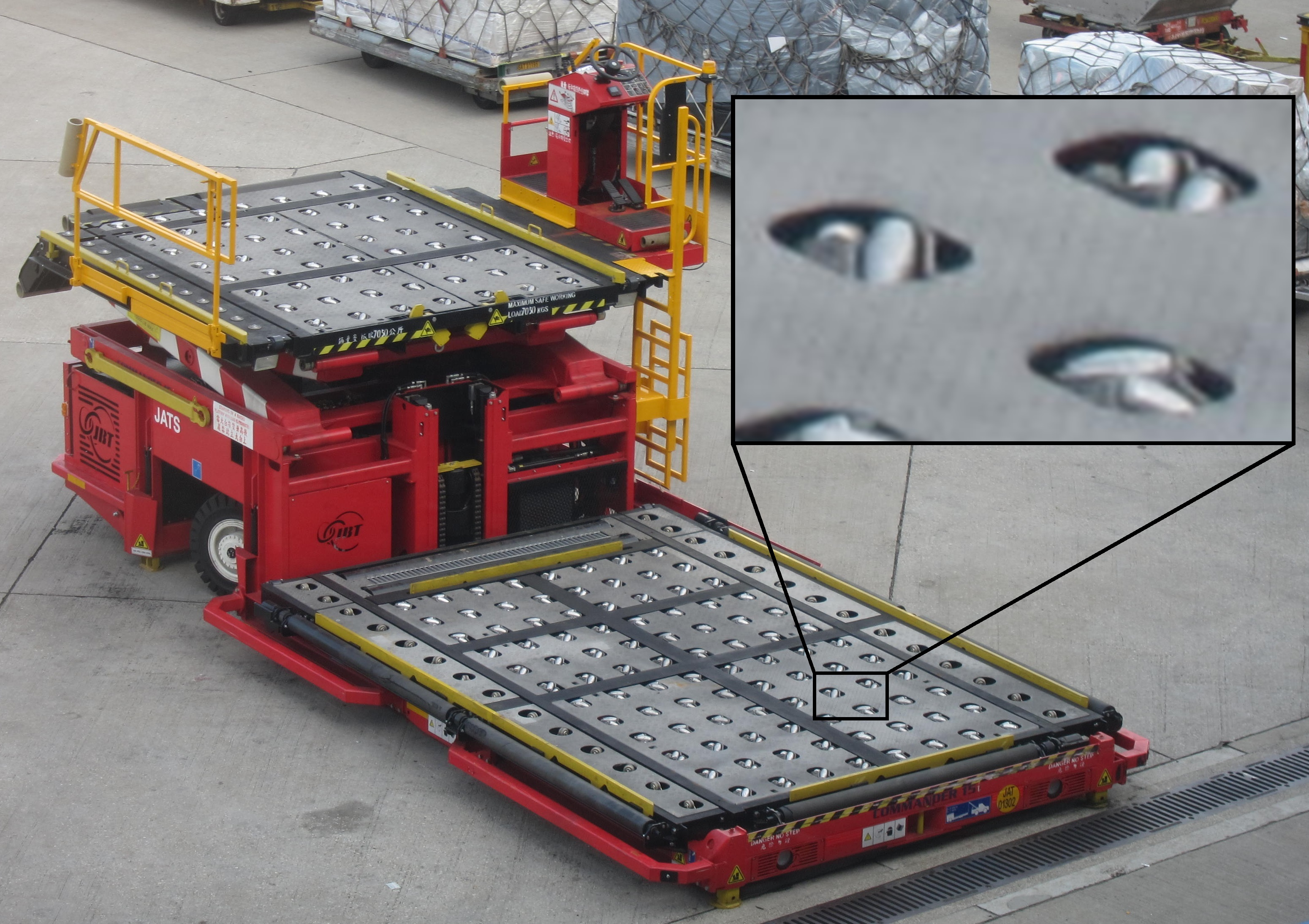
Container loader with numerous powered Mecanum wheels for shifting and rotation of containers.

The Mecanum wheel is a form of tireless wheel, with a series of rubberized external rollers obliquely attached to the whole circumference of its rim. These rollers typically each have an axis of rotation at 45° to the wheel plane and at 45° to the axle line. Each Mecanum wheel is an independent non-steering drive wheel with its own powertrain, and when spinning generates a propelling force perpendicular to the roller axle, which can be vectored into a longitudinal and a transverse component in relation to the vehicle.

The typical Mecanum design is a four-wheel configuration with an alternating with left- and right-handed rollers whose axles at the top of the wheel are parallel to the diagonal of the vehicle frame (and hence perpendicular to the diagonal when at where the bottom of the wheel contacts the ground). In such a way, each wheel will generate a thrust roughly parallel to the corresponding frame diagonal. By varying the rotational speed and direction of each wheel, the summation of the force vectors from each of the wheels will create both linear motions and/or rotations of the vehicle, allowing it to maneuver around with minimal need for space. For example:

- Running all four wheels in the same direction at the same speed will result in a forward/backward movement, as the longitudinal force vectors add up but the transverse vectors cancel each other out;
- Running (all at the same speed) both wheels on one side in one direction while the other side in the opposite direction, will result in a stationary rotation of the vehicle, as the transverse vectors cancel out but the longitudinal vectors couple to generate a torque around the central vertical axis of the vehicle;
- Running (all at the same speed) the diagonal wheels in one direction while the other diagonal in the opposite direction will result in a sideways movement, as the transverse vectors add up but the longitudinal vectors cancel out.

A mix of differential wheel motions will allow for vehicle motion in almost any direction with any rotation.

== Uses ==
Aircraft cargo containers being manipulated by mecanum wheels on a container loader while loading onto a Boeing 777

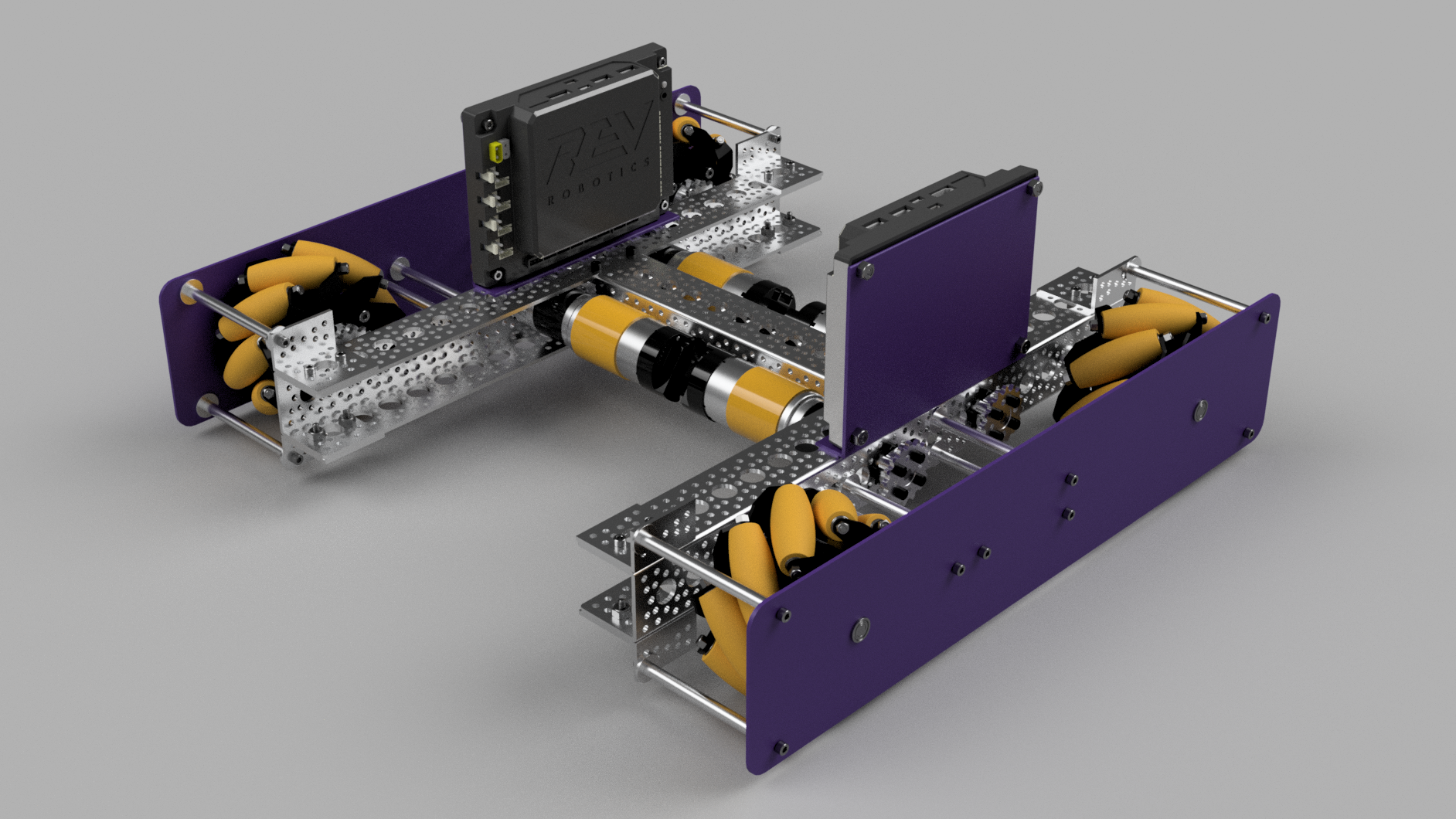
FTC Team 506 Pandara's Mecanum Drivetrain from Palm Harbor University High School

The US Navy bought the patent from Ilon and put researchers to work on it in the 1980s in Panama City, Florida. The US Navy has used it for transporting items around ships. In 1997, Airtrax Incorporated and several other companies each paid the US Navy $2,500 for rights to the technology, including old drawings of how the motors and controllers worked, to build an omnidirectional forklift truck that could maneuver in tight spaces such as the deck of an aircraft carrier. These vehicles are now in production.

Tracked vehicles and skid steer vehicles utilize similar methods for turning. However, these vehicles typically drag across the ground while turning and may do considerable damage to a soft or fragile surface. The high friction against the ground while turning also requires high-torque engines to overcome the friction. By comparison, the design of the Mecanum wheel allows for in-place rotation with minimal ground friction and low torque.

Youth robotics competitions such as FIRST Tech Challenge and VEX Robotics often see the use of Mecanum wheels by participating teams. The omnnidirectional movement provided by the Mecanum design can give robots additional maneuverability and flexibility for tackling the competition's goals and traversing the terrain when the configuration of the competition's playing field is suitable for the design. Many teams have adapted Mecanum wheels from suppliers such as Nexus and GoBilda, or manufacture their own.

The CMU URANUS Mobile Robot was the first mobile robot with Mecanum wheels built in 1985 and was used for two decades for autonomous navigation research. CMU's "Tessellator" robot, designed in 1992 for servicing Space Shuttle tiles, also used Mecanum wheels.

A wheelchair using Mecanum wheels was presented at the 2006 EVER Monaco.

== See also ==
- Ball transfer unit – Omnidirectional bearing
- Omni wheel – Wheel that can move along multiple axes
- Screw-propelled vehicle – Vehicle propelled by load-bearing rotating helical flanges
