= Yamaha TZR =

Yamaha TZR is a motorcycle designation for:

- Yamaha TZR125
- Yamaha TZR250

TZR can also refer to

- Bolton Field, an airport in Ohio, United States (FAA LID: TZR)
