= Honda TRX250R =

All-terrain vehicle

The Honda TRX250R was a sport ATV manufactured by Honda between 1986 and 1989. It combined a lightweight frame and good handling with a liquid-cooled two-stroke engine and six-speed close-ratio transmission. Although only being manufactured for four years, the "250R", as it was known, was long a primary choice for ATV racers until the resurgence of factory involvement and usage of four-stroke engines in sport ATV's beginning in 2003 and 2004.

== Specifications ==
| | 1986 Model | 1987-1989 "Long Rod" Model |
|---|---|---|
| Engine Type | Water-cooled, two-stroke cycle, single cylinder, reed valve, counterbalanced | Water-cooled, two-stroke cycle, single cylinder, reed valve, counterbalanced |
| Ignition | Capacitor discharge ignition | Capacitor discharge ignition |
| Displacement | 246cc (15.0 cu. in.) | 246cc (15.1 cu. in.) |
| Bore and Stroke | 66 X 72 mm (2.60 X 2.83 in) Iron Liner | 66 X 72 mm (2.60 X 2.83 in) Iron Liner |
| Compression Ratio | 7.5:1 | 7.7:1 |
| Engine Dry Weight | 26.0 kg, 57.3 lbs | 26.0 kg, 57.3 lbs |
| Lubrication | Two-stroke oil/fuel Pre-mix | Two-stroke oil/fuel Pre-mix |
| Carburetion | Keihin 34mm PJ05A | Keihin 34mm PJ07B |
| Starting | Forward Kick | Forward Kick |
| Transmission | Six Speed Sequential Shift (No reverse) | Six Speed Sequential (No reverse) |
| Clutch/Shifter | Left Hand Manual Cable/Left Foot | Left Hand Manual Cable/Left Foot |
| Final Drive | Chain and Sprocket / 13:39 / 520 O-ring Chain | Chain and Sprocket / 13:38 / 520 O-ring Chain |
| Fuel Capacity | 2.6 Gal, incl. 0.5 Gal Reserve | 2.6 Gal, incl. 0.5 Gal Reserve |
| Wheelbase | 51.2" | 49.8" |
| Length/Width/Height | 71.9" / 44.5" / 42.1" | 72.4" / 45.7" / 42.6" |
| Seat Height | 30.5" | 31.2" |
| Dry Weight | 357 lbs. | 330 lbs. |
| Frame | Steel Square Tube | Steel Square Tube |
| Front Suspension | Dual A-Arm w/ 5-way preload adjustable Showa Shocks / 7.9" Travel | Dual A-Arm w/ 5-way preload adjustable Showa Shocks / 7.9" Travel |
| Rear Suspension | Single compression rebound and preload adjustable Showa shock with Pro-Link linkage / 9.1" Travel | Single compression rebound and preload adjustable Showa shock with Pro-Link linkage / 9.1" Travel |
| Front Brakes | Dual hydraulic discs with twin-piston calipers | Dual hydraulic discs with twin-piston calipers, 174mm discs |
| Rear Brake | Hydraulic disc with twin-piston caliper | Hydraulic disc with twin-piston caliper, 186mm disc |
| Front Tires | 21x7-10 Ohtsu H-trak R/T 101 | 22x7-10 Ohtsu H-trak R/T 101; 22x7-10 Ohtsu H-trak M/R 101 Radial (option) |
| Rear Tires | 20x10-9 Ohtsu H-trak P/V 701Z | 20x10-9 Ohtsu H-trak P/V 701Z; 20x10-9 Ohtsu H-trak M/R 501 Radial (option) |
| Top Speed | 71 mph | 71 mph |
| Lighting | Handlebar-mounted 60/55 watt halogen (1986/1987) | Nosepiece-mounted 60/55 watt halogen (1988/1989) |
| Color | (1986/1987) Red/White or Blue/White | (1988) Red/Red, (1989) Red/White |
| MSRP | $2498 | $2998 |

== Generations ==
The TRX250R was introduced for the 1986 model year to answer Suzuki’s LT250R, released the year prior. Honda borrowed many parts from its three-wheel ATC250R for the Fourtrax’s design, including the engine and rear suspension. Although the latter was mechanically similar, Honda detuned its engine through reduced compression and less aggressive porting, to ensure that the added weight of the quad would not adversely affect the reliability of the engine.

The 1987 model year, now absent the three-wheelers because of a CPSC safety ban, saw the engine receive a five-millimeter longer connecting rod, accompanied by a piston with a wrist pin bore raised five millimeters. Additionally, the cylinder was changed to include a bridged intake. Most of the chassis of the 1987 Fourtrax remained the same.

The 1988 model year brought the most dramatic changes to the TRX250R. The compression ratio of the engine was raised to generate more power, bringing it nearly on par with Kawasaki’s powervalved Tecate-4. It was the chassis, however, that received the greatest attention, shedding 25 pounds over the previous year’s model. Additionally a shorter aluminum swing arm was added, but the frame lengthened such that the overall wheelbase was slightly greater. This shifted the weight bias rearward, curing the Fourtrax’s “loop out” problem. Aesthetically, the Fourtrax's headlight was moved from the handlebars to a mount molded into the hood. This was also the only year to be available with red fenders.

For 1989 the TRX250R received few changes. Most notable was the use of a needle bearing in the clutch pressure plate, for smoother action. This needle bearing was a necessary upgrade for the 1988 TRX250R, as well [3]. The color was returned to white for its final year.

== Rise of the aftermarket ==
While raced in mostly stock form in its earliest years, by the time production rules were initiated only about six of the TRX250R's components had to be purchased from Honda [3]. According to CT Racing's Allen Knowles, “More aftermarket parts have been made for the 250R than any other ATV.” [3] “Sixty Percent of my business was based on the R, compared to the next highest Banshee, at fifteen percent. With only the Banshee, I would have starved” said Wayne Hinson of Hinson Racing. [3]

Initially, items that were subject to the most abuse from racing were the first to be remade. Originally made of die cast aluminum, the clutch basket was found to be weak when power was increased or subjected to race conditions. The first aftermarket clutch basket was a machined steel piece campaigned by Gary Denton in 1989.[3] Wayne Hinson, who would later found worldwide clutch component manufacturer Hinson Racing, designed the clutch basket and later changed it to billet aluminum in 1991.[3]

A regular trend that started on the Fourtrax that would not carry over to the four strokes was the use of aftermarket frames. Stock frames on most mass-produced quads are made of mild steel and, though suitable for recreational use, will quickly develop cracks when raced. Without new quads available after the 1989 model year, stronger replacement frames for racing were soon needed. The first aftermarket frame for the 250R was made by dirt track motorcycle chassis builder, C&J in 1991 for CT Racing.[3] This frame was a direct replacement for the original, maintaining stock suspension geometry. The first altered geometry frame was introduced by JP Racing a short while later. [3] This design brought the front suspension mounts in one inch on each side, allowing the use of longer suspension arms in competition, which increased wheel travel and improved the ride qualities. By 2003, a myriad of aftermarket frames could be had from numerous manufacturers in both stock and altered geometry, made of steel and aluminum. Lone Star Racing produced a titanium frame, but AMA rules prevented its use in competition.

Though Honda was initially concerned with reliability and detuned the original 250cc motor, with the release of the Pro-X (pro-cross) cylinder and head in 1994, the 250R's displacement could be increased well into the 300cc range by changing the cylinder alone. Additionally, this and other aftermarket cylinders offered advanced port layout for more tuning options. With modifications to the transmission cases, later aftermarket cylinders and crankshafts permitted engine displacements to reach 500cc's. The last version of the Pro-X cylinder, as well as others, also added an exhaust operated powervalve, a feature that was left off the 250R but used almost universally by the competition, as well as in Two-Stroke motocross bikes since the mid-eighties.

Although great increases in displacement and power became possible, the TRX250R's transmission did have its limits, and gear strength became an issue. To allow for the larger engines a joint venture between Baldwin Motorsports and Timken Bearing, in the 90's, produced a set of stronger aftermarket gears. These gears permitted engines over 330cc's to be reliably raced. The TRX250R is the only quad for which such a product was made.

== Honda's Reasoning Behind Use of 4-stroke engines in modern Sport ATV’s ==
A driving reason Honda chose to use a larger displacement four stroke engine instead of the traditional two stroke as part of their re-involvement in competition ATV's can be learned from the following excerpt taken from world.honda.com:

"To achieve the cleaner emissions and higher fuel economy targets it announced for motorcycles in 1999, Honda began as early as 1997 to take measures to discontinue the use of 2-stroke engines by the end of fiscal 2002. These simply structured 2-stroke engines had been adopted mainly in small motorcycles because of their superior output. Our goal was to replace them with more environment-friendly 4-stroke engine technology."

== Facts ==
Named “ATV of the Century” by “4-Wheel ATV Action” [9]
