= Yamaha RZ350 =

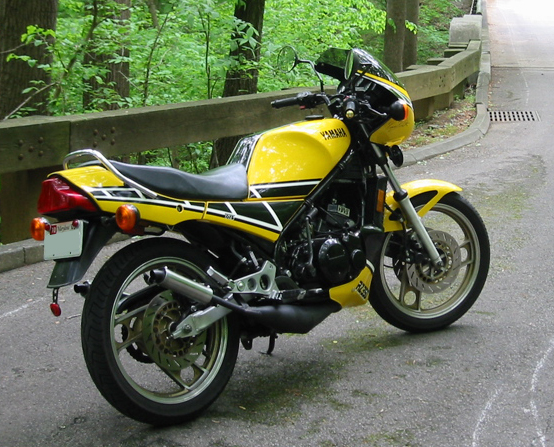
- A 1984 RZ equipped with aftermarket 'expansion chamber' exhausts
- Manufacturer: Yamaha Motor Company
- Production: 1983 - 1995
- Predecessor: Yamaha RD350LC
- Related: Yamaha Banshee 350; Yamaha RD250; Yamaha RD350 YPVS

The Yamaha RZ350 is a two-stroke motorcycle produced by Japanese motorcycle manufacturer Yamaha between 1983 and 1996. Available in the US from 1983 to 1985, Canada until 1990 and Brazil until 1996. The RZ was the final evolution of the popular and well-known series of RD Yamaha motorcycles, and as such is also known as the RD350LC II or RD350 YPVS.

It is powered by a twin-carburetted reed valve inducted, liquid-cooled, 347cc parallel-twin two-stroke engine, with a bore and stroke of 64mm x 54mm. It was the first RD series from Yamaha to receive the 'YPVS' Yamaha Power Valve System. A different version of this motor with no YPVS was also used in the Yamaha Banshee 350 ATV, which was produced for some markets until 2012.

It is also raced extensively in Vintage racing leagues, as well as its own racing leagues, often dubbed "RZ cups" in Europe and Canada.

== Versions ==
There were several models, the 1985 RZ350F, 1986-92 RZ350F2, N, NF, and the 1992-5 RZ350RR which was produced in Brazil. The picture shown to the right is a model with an aftermarket "Expansion Chamber" which was a higher flowing, high-performance exhaust system, devoid of the catalytic converter and other exhaust pollution control items.

Generally there were 4 main variants, produced for various markets.

1983/4 - F1 model with a bikini fairing attached to the forks, separate side and tail panels, offset fuel filler and semi-italic wheels.

1985 - F1 model with RD/RZ500 style full fairing (frame mounted and using the same top panel as the 500) and Variable Damper forks, alongside N1 (naked) models with no fairing. 1985 was a transitional year between early and late models with styling from both. Detailed information on this model can be found here

1986-1992 - F2 and N2 models with a restyled fuel tank, seat and side/tail panels that looked '1 piece'.

1992-1995 - RD350R model (made in Brazil) with FZR600 style twin light top fairing and various detail differences. This version was also imported to the UK in limited numbers.

The 1983-1985 models are the most collectible.

The RZ350 was sold in Europe during 1983–1992, the UK during 1983–1995, Australia during 1983–1988, the United States during 1984 - 1985, and Canada in 1983–1990.

EU/UK - All models were designated RD, not RZ. 1983 350 models designated 31k. 1985 F1 models introduced. New F2 and N2 models in 1986 produced until 1992. 1992-95 UK imports RD350R model (made in Brazil).

Australia - Same 83 - 85 models as UK/EU, but more 250s sold due to licensing restrictions for learner riders and provisional licence holders limited to 250cc motorcycles (though many fitted “RZ250” decals to the larger model). 1986 saw the introduction F2/N2, but in 1987 a round light full fairing model appeared. Discontinued in 1988.

USA - In the USA the RZ came with catalytic converters for emissions requirements, and was the first motorcycle to do so. It was only sold in California in 1985, as the RZ350NC, and a second version was sold in late 1985 and 1986 as the RZ350NC2, both of which had an EVAP canister and an additional catalytic converter in the exhaust pipe header to meet California emission regulations. Sales of the RZ350 were discontinued in the US after 1986, as Yamaha decided the two-stroke would use too much of their United States Environmental Protection Agency fleet emissions quota, and limit sales of larger displacement bikes, which were more popular sellers.

The RZ350 was the first Yamaha street bike sold in the US that used a "perimeter" frame with frame rails around the underside of the fuel tank as opposed to the standard frames of the era with a spine under the center of the fuel tank.

== Styling ==
The 1984 USA models came in yellow and black (Kenny Roberts Special) and a metallic red, white, and blue model with different graphics and no Kenny Roberts signature on the upper cowl. In 1985, the red white and blue strobe versions had identical graphics to the yellow and black "bumble bee" Kenny Roberts version, complete with signature, but with a red frame. Leftover models with revised graphics that somewhat resembled the 1983 UK versions were also produced. These were sold as the RZ350NC2 in California only from late 1985–6 with gold rims and a Kenny Roberts signature. The estimated RZ350 production for the USA is approximately 20,000 motorcycles.

The RZ350 had a variable exhaust port valve called the Yamaha Power Valve System (YPVS) that was controlled by a basic computer. The YPVS could open and close the valve to move the height of the exhaust port and thus affect the exhaust port timing. This provided lower RPM torque while retaining high RPM power. The interchangeability of many of the major engine components with the Yamaha Banshee ATV has allowed strong aftermarket support for the RZ350.

The RZ had a 500cc stablemate called the RZ500. It came in a red-on-white color scheme. It was a twin-crank V4 (much like the GP bikes of the era) and was a quite different bike. Some distributors and dealers sold these bikes with custom paint jobs, causing confusion about OEM paint schemes.

In many countries, these bikes were known as RDs, but in North America and Australia they were called RZs. In Australia, England, Canada, and the USA the Yamaha RD series (RD60, RD125, RD200, RD250, RD350, RD400) from which the later RZ/RD were descended, were first released in the 1970s as air-cooled two-strokes. In 1980 the bikes had a redesign using ideas Yamaha gained from two-stroke Grand Prix and production race experiences. They also became liquid-cooled and had 'LC' appended to the name to designate this e.g.: RD350LC - some people referred to them as the "Elsie". The LC is the link between the earlier air-cooled RDs, and the later power valve (YPVS) equipped RZ series. The most common capacities sold in Australia were 250cc (maximum capacity allowed for new road riders) and 350cc.

The name changed to RZ (in Australia at least), with the introduction of the variable exhaust valve design in 1983 on the 'K' model. This was a whole new bike and although similar in concept, did not share any parts of the earlier LC series.
