= Yamaha RD350 YPVS =

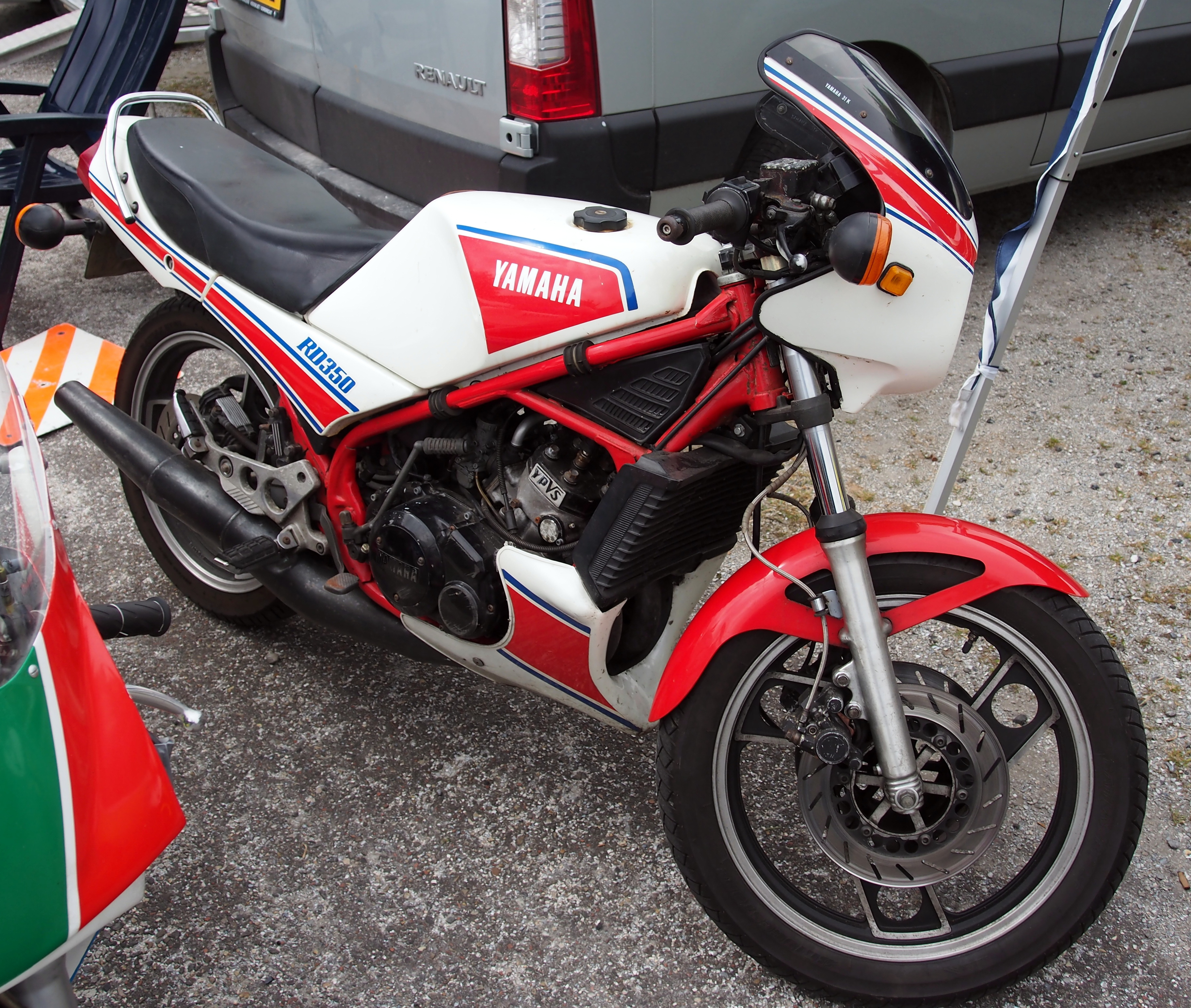
- Manufacturer: Yamaha
- Also called: RZ350
- Production: 1983–1986
- Predecessor: Yamaha RD400
- Related: Yamaha RD500LC

Yamaha RD350 YPVS is a motorcycle that Yamaha made from 1983 to 1986. It was launched at the Cologne motorcycle show as "the nearest thing to a road going racer ever produced".

It had a parallel-twin two-stroke engine with identical bore and stroke of its predecessor, the Yamaha RD350LC. Yamaha debuted their breakthrough YPVS power valve system that revolutionized the two-stroke engine in the RD350 YPVS of 1983 .

In some countries, like the US, the YPVS models were sold as Yamaha RZ350. It was made in Japan from 1983 to 1986.

It was replaced by the RD350 F2 in 1986,

In 1992 the production was moved to Brazil, and the model was called RD350R and was produced until 1995. (New front fairing with two head lamps.)

The RD500LC was the ultimate evolution of Yamaha's 2 stroke road going machinery, featuring a 500cc V4 YPVS engine.

== See also ==
- List of Yamaha motorcycles
