= DS7 =

DS7, DS-7, or DS 7 may refer to:

- DS 7 (crossover), a French compact SUV
- Maybach Zeppelin DS7, a German full-size sedan
- Yamaha DS7, a Japanese motorcycle
