= Yamaha RD250 =

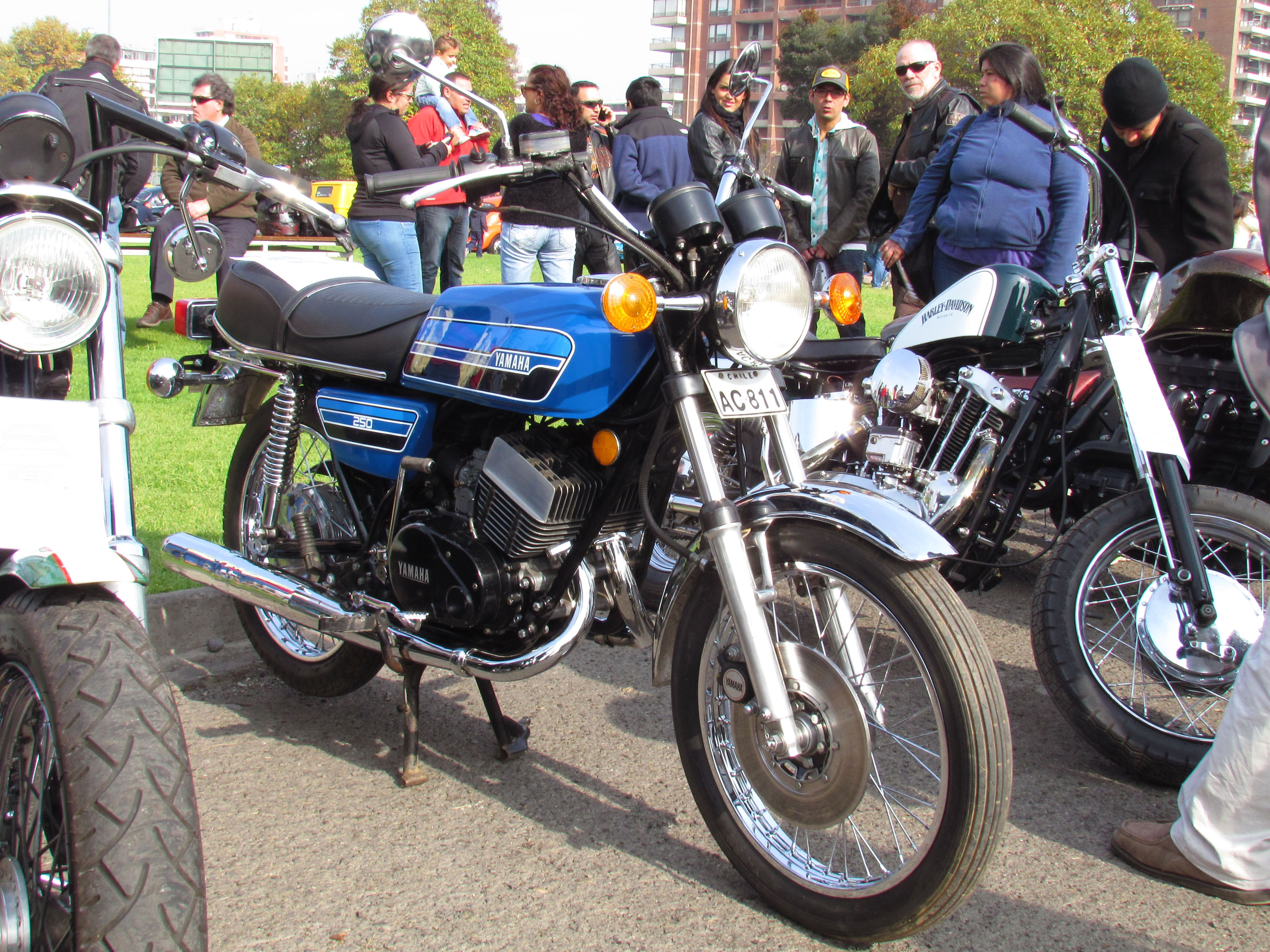
- RD250 1976
- Manufacturer: Yamaha Motor Company
- Also called: Yamaha RZ250
- Production: 1973–1987
- Predecessor: Yamaha DS7
- Successor: Yamaha TZR250
- Class: standard
- Engine: 247 cc (15.1 cu in), two-stroke
- Bore / stroke: 54 mm × 54 mm (2.1 in × 2.1 in)
- Compression ratio: 6.7:1
- Related: Yamaha RD350, Yamaha RD350LC, Yamaha RZ350

The Yamaha RD250 is a 250 cc (15 cu in) two-stroke motorcycle produced by Yamaha Motor Corporation between 1973 and 1987.

Four generations of RD (also known as the RZ250 in the Japanese and Australian markets) were produced: the air-cooled models from 1973 up to 1979, and from 1980 until 1987 the liquid cooled models; known as the RD250LC, RD250LC-II and RD250 YPVS. The name RD never stood for Race Developed that was just a marketing guy in the UK during the late 70s who penned the Race Developed tag, instead RD is the factory code for the type of machine IE; R for road and D for two stroke, DT= D for two stroke and T for Trail, XS = X for four stroke and S for Street and so on, the entire model range falls into this thinking.

The standard bike weighed 152 kg dry and had a 247cc 2-stroke twin engine that produced 30 hp. It had a 6 speed gearbox, but on the first version 6th was disabled, but could be reinstated by removing a blanking plate on the gear selector drum. The motorcycle had chain final drive.

In 1983 the UK government reduced the maximum cc for learners to 125, killing off the 250 cc motorcycle class in a stroke. At the time, it was considered that the reason for the sudden change in the law was the RD250 which put a high-speed vehicle into the hands of inexperienced users.
