= Honda ATC250R =

Three-wheeled ATV produced by Honda in the 80s

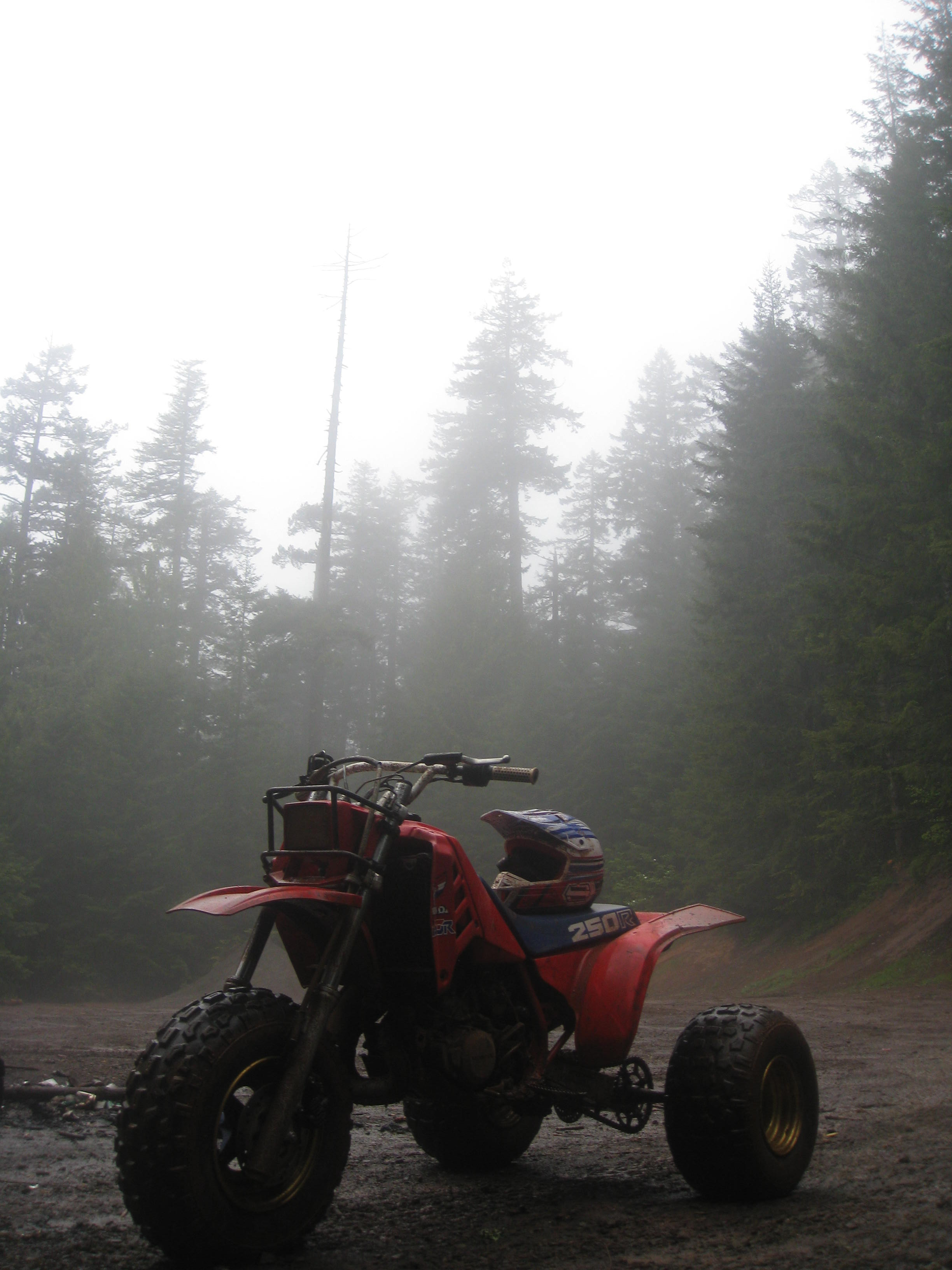
- Manufacturer: Honda
- Production: 1981-1987
- Successor: Honda TRX250R ATV
- Class: Sport ATC
- Engine: two-stroke single-cylinder
- Related: Honda CR250R

The ATC250R is a high-performance, three-wheeled ATV produced by Honda from 1981 to 1987. Cited as the first high performance ATC introduced, production began with an air-cooled, 248 cc single-cylinder two-stroke engine, but would see a liquid-cooled, 246 cc engine by 1985. All model years were fully suspended and adjustable, using air-assisted front forks and a single, remote reservoir gas-charged rear shock. 1981–1982 models offered 6.7 inches of front suspension travel and 4.3 inches in the rear, 1983–1984 offered 8.7 inches in front and 8.1 inches rear, while post-1985 models allowed 9.8 inches of travel. All model years also used a gear-driven counter-balancer to reduce engine vibration. Dual disc brakes were used on all model years, with the exception of the 1981, which used a front disc and a rear drum.

== First generation (1981-1982) ==
The introduction of the 1981 ATC250R marked a milestone in off-road history, as it was the first two-stroke ATC designed specifically for racing. While ATC racing was in its infancy, racers had to rely on Honda's ATC110 and ATC185 models on the racetrack. Both of these four-stroke models were sluggish and poorly suspended when compared to the 2-stroke ATC250R, which borrowed heavily from the Honda CR250R motocross line.

== Second generation (1983-1984) ==
The 1983 ATC250R incorporated many improvements, introducing the Pro-Link suspension, folding foot pegs, a larger fuel tank, slightly longer travel suspension in front and rear. While the engine design remained similar, the Fuel delivery was increased from the previous 27 mm, to a 30 mm round-slide carburetor.

== Third generation (1985-1987) ==
Third Generation
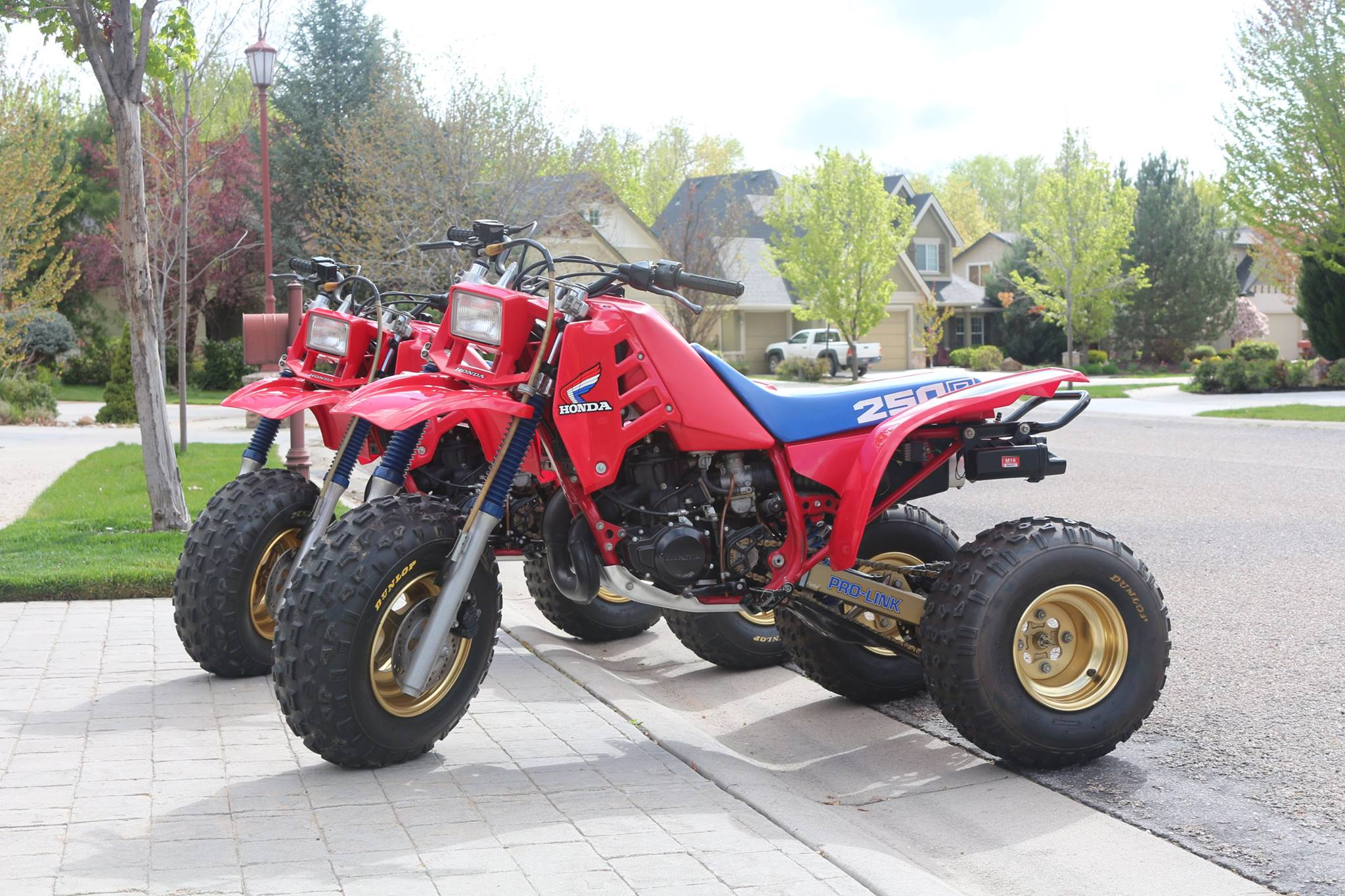
- Two 1985 Honda ATC 250R's
- Manufacturer: Honda
- Production: 1985-1987
- Successor: Honda TRX250R ATV
- Class: Sport ATC
- Engine: 246 cc (15.0 cu in) liquid-cooled two-stroke single
- Bore / stroke: 66 x 72mm
- Top speed: < 80 Mph
- Ignition type: CDI
- Transmission: 6-speed with wet multi-disc manual clutch
- Frame type: steel
- Brakes: F/R: Hydraulic Disc Brake
- Tires: Front: 23.5 x 8 x 11; Rear:20 x 11 x 9
- Wheelbase: 51 in.
- Dimensions: L: 74.6 in.
- Seat height: 29 in.
- Weight: 293 lbs. (dry)

In 1985 the ATC250R was updated with a 246cc liquid cooled engine, and 6-speed transmission. This 2-stroke engine was notable for not incorporating a power-valve, featured commonly on other machines by 1985. Fuel was delivered via a 34 mm round carb in 1985 and flat slide carburetor for the remainder of production.

This would be the last Generation offered for sale, discontinued in the United States in 1986, after an agreement between manufacturers and the Consumer Product Safety Commission to cease production on all 3-wheeled ATVs resulting from thousands of legal battles regarding safety issues and high accident rates. US Dealers were instructed to remove the motors and other common parts of remaining models, and then cut the frames in half to prevent new sales.

The 1987 ATC250R models were released in limited numbers in Europe and Canada. While rumors persist that the 1987 models were intended to feature new colors, a redesigned logo, and possibly keyed ignition, these models were virtually identical to the ‘86 offering.

Though sold concurrently, the Honda TRX250R would remain in the Honda line-up until 1989, effectively becoming the ATC's successor. The four-wheeler used many of the same components as the ATC250R, including a slightly detuned version of the ATC's engine.

== Competitive racing ==
Honda created the ATC250R as a consumer sport ATV, but would offer multiple variations to their factory racing teams in the 1980s. These machines were designed for several displacement classes. The ATC125R, ATC200R, ATC300R, ATC350R, ATC400R, ATC480R, and ATC500R were all tested at various times during ATC production.

The Honda ATC250R's competition came largely from the Kawasaki KXT250 Tecate 3 and Yamaha Tri-Z 250, and to a smaller extent from companies such as Tiger ATV. The ATC250R is often compared to the Honda ATC350X, a sport ATC featuring a 350cc 4-stroke engine. The ATC350X was not competitive on professional circuits, and was better suited to amateur racing and recreational riding.
