= Yamaha TZR250 =

Japanese lightweight sports motorcycle produced from 1986–1995

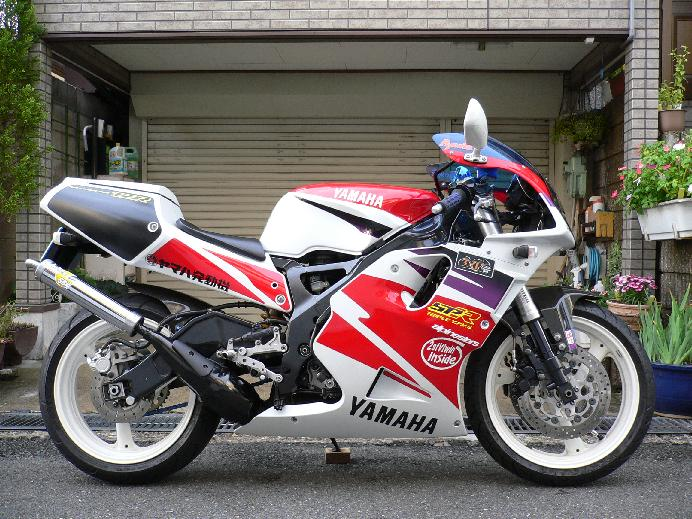
- Manufacturer: Yamaha Motor Company
- Production: 1986–1995
- Predecessor: Yamaha RD250
- Class: Sports motorcycle
- Engine: 249 cc (15.2 cu in) two-stroke parallel-twin
- Bore / stroke: 56.4 mm × 50 mm (2.2 in × 2.0 in)
- Compression ratio: 5.9:1
- Power: 45 hp (34 kW) (restricted)
- Transmission: 6-speed constant-mesh manual
- Tires: Front: 110/70–17; Rear: 150/60–17
- Wheelbase: 54.1 in (1,370 mm)
- Dimensions: L: 78.9 in (2,005 mm); W: 26 in (660 mm); H: 44.7 in (1,135 mm)
- Weight: 280 lb (127 kg) (dry); 320 lb (150 kg) (wet)
- Related: Yamaha TZR125; Yamaha TZR50

The Yamaha TZR250 is a sport-oriented, fully faired motorcycle manufactured by Yamaha from 1986 to 1995.

Publicly unveiled during autumn 1985, this road-going two-stroke was noted for being loosely based on the TZ250 racing motorcycle. As a natural replacement for the popular RD250 and RD350LC series of the 1980s, the TZR250 introduced a comparatively more modern design and chassis construction. It featured an aluminium-alloy frame and swingarm, along with full-body styling while also enjoying the Yamaha Power Valve System (YPVS) that was used to vary the effective exhaust port height according to engine speed, with the servo motor beginning to open the power valve at about 6,000 rpm. In standard form, the engine produced 45 hp as a result of restrictions in the exhaust system and ignition boxes; lifting these restrictions could raise output to approaching 50 hp, or higher if other modifications were made. Throughout its production run, the TZR250 underwent major changes from its original parallel-twin layout through the reverse-cylinder models and eventually to the 90° V-twin versions.

== Racing ==
The TZR250 was still raced in the Yamaha Past Masters race series with the British racing club (BMCRC) as of 2024. Racing engines are currently claiming about 56 hp (42 kW) at 11,000 rpm. Racing fuel ratios typically 1:30. Standard exhausts are difficult to improve on in terms of power and torque, but they are very large and impede ground clearance. Jolly Moto (Italian after market exhaust maker) exhausts are popular replacements as they are lighter, produce similar performance while improving ground clearance.

An F3 racing kit was produced for a few years which included ignition boxes, carbs and exhaust, helping increase maximum revs, power and torque.

== Generations ==
=== First generation ===
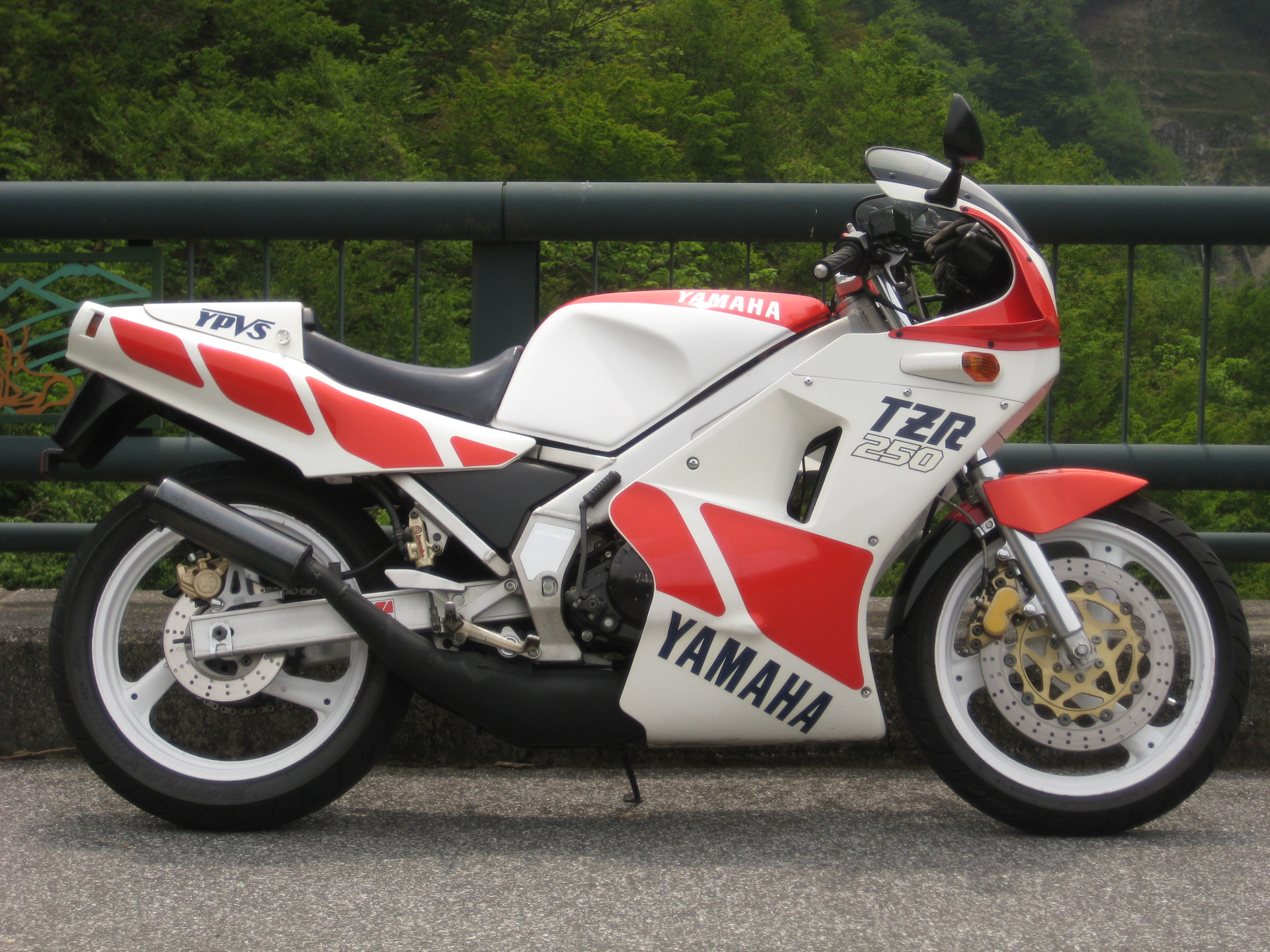
1986 Yamaha TZR250 (JP spec)

Production started in June 1986. At an introductory price of JP¥549,000 in Japan, the TZR250 was regarded as notably expensive for a 250 cc-class product. The parallel-twin 2MA model was the export variant produced for the UK, mainland Europe, as well as Oceania and Canada, while those bearing the 1KT model code were its domestic Japanese counterparts. To comply with Japanese laws stipulating an upper power limit of 45 hp for 250 cc motorcycles, the 1KT was fitted with a more restrictive CDI, giving its engine a lower state of tune than that of the 2MA in factory trim. Otherwise, variations between the two models were minimal (e.g., English versus Japanese labeling on the brake master cylinder). The lighting arrangement also differed to satisfy UK type approval regulations, particularly the indicators, which were mounted on stalks rather than faired into the bodywork. After the 2MA, the manufacturer sold subsequent models exclusively in Japan.

=== Second generation ===
In 1989, the parallel-twin, reverse-cylinder version arrived, designated 3MA (3MA1). In 1990, the 3MA received upside-down forks, as well as a differently shaped expansion chamber for more mid-range power at the expense of some top-end power (3MA3). Then, the timeframe from 1991 to 1995 saw the V-twin era (3XV).

=== Third generation ===
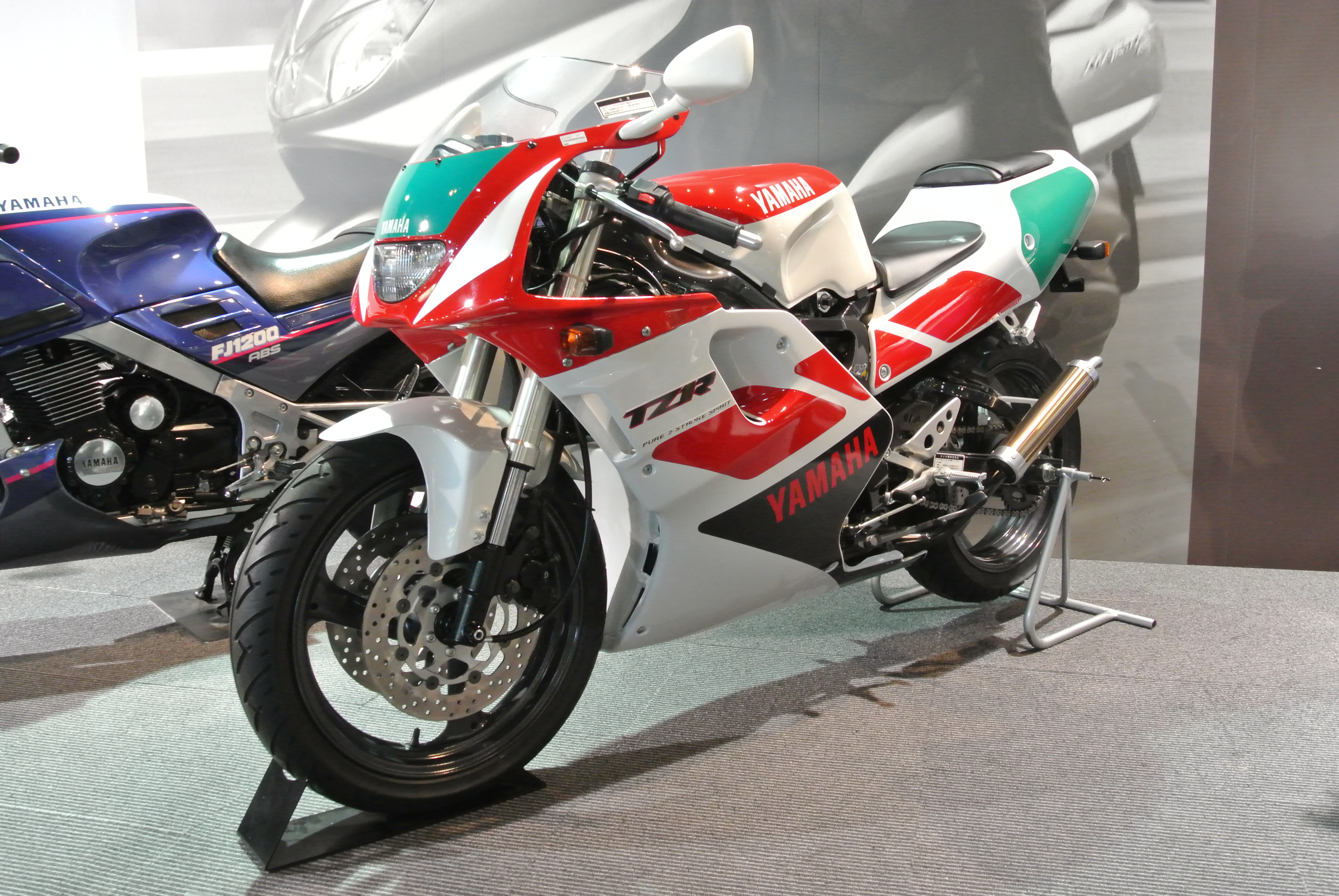
TZR250R on display at the Yamaha Communication Plaza

The 3XV came in several variants, differing in areas such as carburettors, ignition systems, clutch types, power-valve arrangements and cylinders. The principal model codes were TZR250R, TZR250RS, TZR250SP, and TZR250SPR. Individual sub-variants can be distinguished by differences in the number-board markings on the side panels and front fairing. They closely followed the engine configuration of the competition-only TZ250 of the time, sharing the same engine casings and frames and, in some models, the same cylinders, carburettors and power valves. Yamaha's official distribution of new TZR250 units for domestic sale ended just before the 2000s mainly due to emissions regulations. No further specification changes were implemented on the TZR250 nameplate following the pillion-capable 3XVC (TZR250SPR)'s January 1995 release.
