= Yamaha RD350LC =

RD350LC
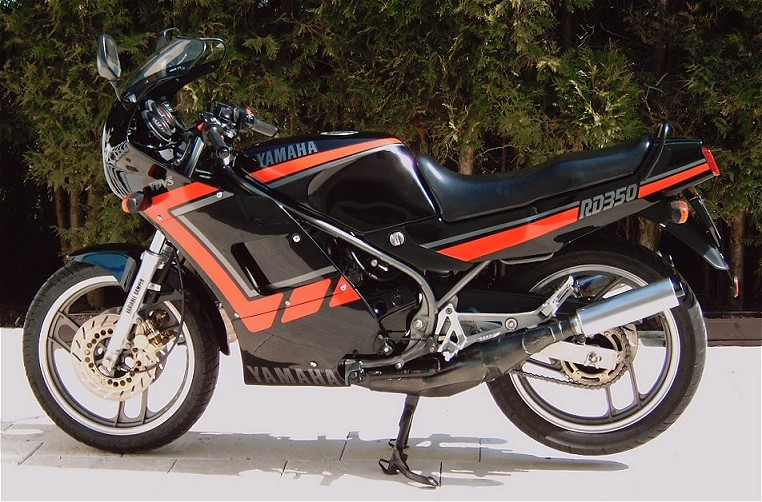
- Manufacturer: Yamaha Motor Corporation
- Production: 1980–1983
- Predecessor: Yamaha RD400
- Successor: Yamaha RZ350, Yamaha RD350 YPVS
- Engine: 347 cc (21.2 cu in) parallel twin two-stroke
- Bore / stroke: 64 mm × 54 mm (2.5 in × 2.1 in)
- Compression ratio: 6.2:1
- Power: 49 bhp (37 kW), 1980 (1981-1983)
- Wheelbase: 1,320 mm (52 in)
- Weight: 154 kg (340 lb) (dry)
- Fuel capacity: 16 L (3.5 imp gal; 4.2 US gal)
- Related: Yamaha RD500LC

The Yamaha RD350LC was a two-stroke motorcycle produced by Yamaha between 1980 and 1983.

Although it immediately succeeded the larger RD400, the RD350LC was powered by a smaller 347cc parallel twin two-stroke engine which actually had the same bore and stroke as the older RD350 (64 x 54mm). However, Yamaha added liquid cooling and made other modifications in porting and exhaust to comply with ever-tightening emissions regulations.

The RD350LC was later replaced by the RZ350 / RD350LC II / RD350 YPVS in 1983, but the LC(1) was also sold in that year alongside the new bike. The RD350LC was aimed at the European market alongside the smaller capacity Yamaha RD250LC.

The 1980 to 1982 350 cc models were codenamed 4L0 and are affectionately known as Elsie. This model was not officially sold in the US but was available in neighboring Canada. Yamaha debuted their breakthrough YPVS power valve system that revolutionized the two-stroke engine in the RD350 YPVS of 1983.

== Development ==
The RD350LC constantly evolved throughout its life and it was made in Brazil in the final years, as the RD350R. In some countries, such as the US and Australia, the later (YPVS equipped) models were sold as Yamaha RZ350. It was made in Japan from 1980 to 1986 and in Brazil from 1986 to 1995. The same engine without the YPVS powered the popular Yamaha Banshee 350 ATV.

== See also ==
- List of Yamaha motorcycles
- Yamaha RD350 YPVS
