= Yamaha TZR125 =

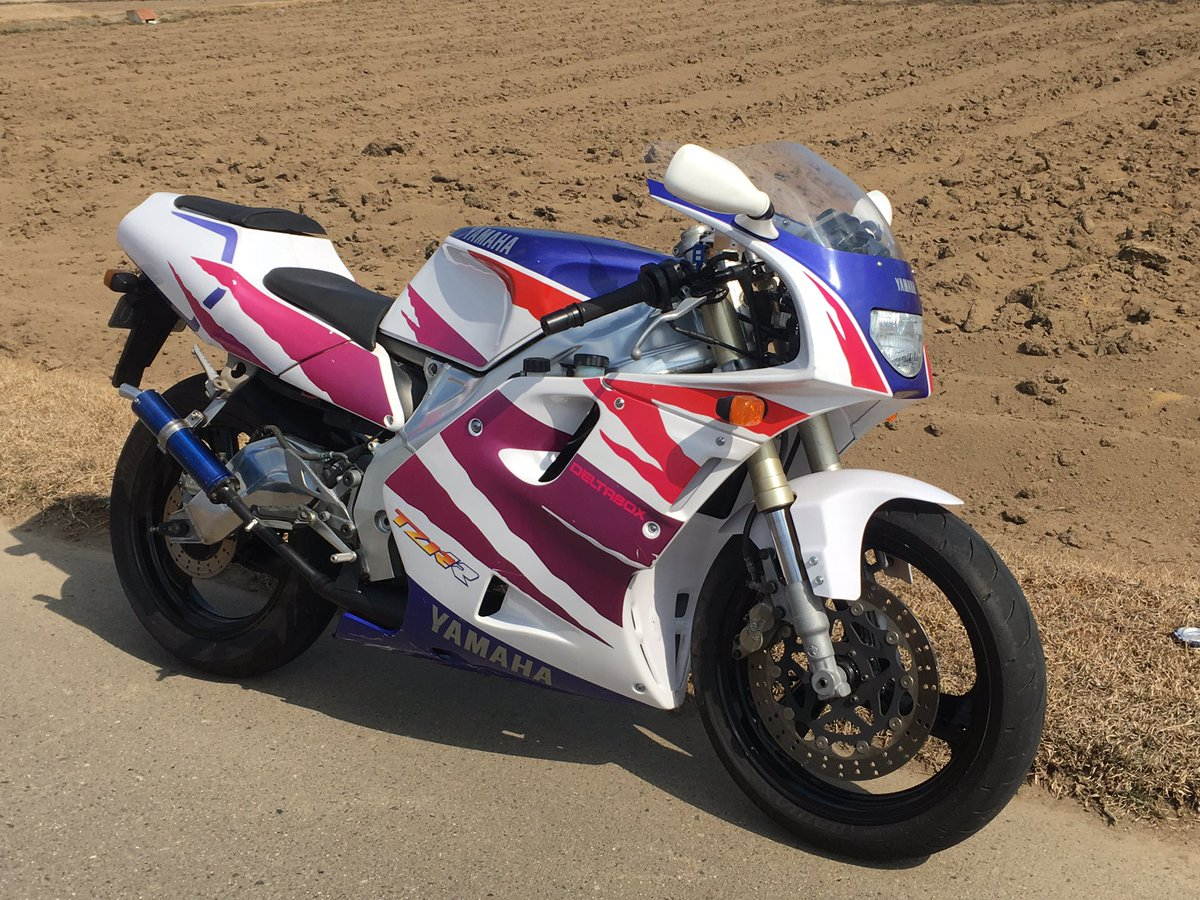
- Manufacturer: Yamaha
- Production: 1987 - 1997
- Class: Sport bike
- Related: Yamaha TZR250; Yamaha TZR50

The Yamaha TZR125 is a two-stroke 125 cc (7.6 cu in) sports motorcycle made for the European and South East Asian markets which uses the YPVS. The TZR125 was produced from 1987 and spanned two generations until the late 1990s each with a number of variants and sub variants.

The Yamaha TZR125 can be seen in Wong Kar-Wai's Fallen Angels where actor and singer Takeshi Kaneshiro rides it.

== First generation ==
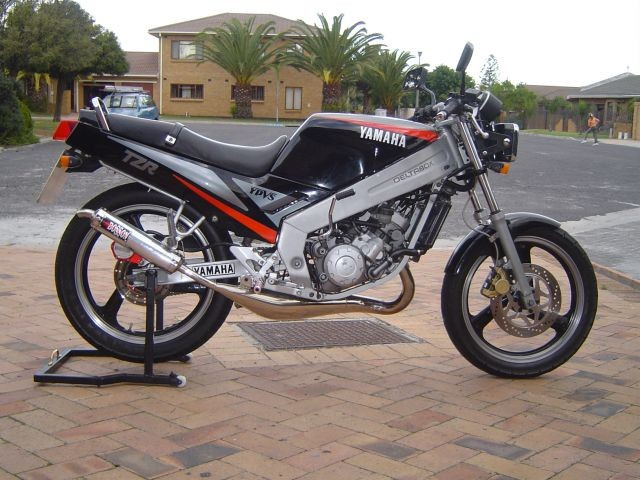
Yamaha TZR125 3TY

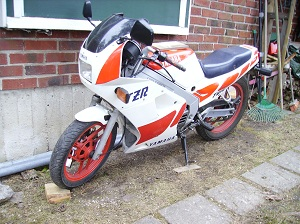
1987 Yamaha TZR 125

Yamaha introduced the TZR125 in 1987 and production ended in 1992. It is identified by the single square headlight at the front of the box fairing, clip-ons located on top of the yoke, single seat and conventional forks.

Later TZR's can be identified by three-spoke alloy wheels and a rear disc brake.

The first generation has a number of variants: 2RH; 2RJ; 2RK; 2RL; 2RM; 2RN; 2TU; 2UT; 2VR; 3FN; 3PA; 3PB; 3PC; 3PD; 3PE; 3SY; 3TY.

=== First Generation TZR 4dl 1 (R) ===
In 1991, Yamaha introduced the R series of TZR125s which have very little in common with the previous generation. Known as 4dl series 1 They can be identified by the separate rider and pillion seats, and it has a squared rear fairing with storage compartment under the seat accessed by a flap at the rear, upside down forks, scoops on the sides of the fairings. it is easily distinguished in comparison with the series 2

It was assembled by Belgarda in Italy from imported Japanese parts and made use of Italian components. Brembo brake system and rims, upside down Paioli forks and the crankcase manufactured by Moto Minarelli. The 4DLs can be identified by the code 3MB00 embossed on the cylinder block and 4DL at the start of the serial numbers on the crankcase and frames. The 4DL came in two versions. Series 1 ended in 1992 or 1993. from 1993 onwards came the TZR 125 (RR) (series 2) which is a very different bike with a revised engine. Some of the differences between the series 1 (R) and series 2 (RR) are as follows

different gearing and gearbox components cylinder and cylinder head, CDI, servo, fairings, frame (braced with cut outs near seat), exhaust (long stinger), airbox, storage access changed with newer fairing no sidelight above the headlight. and new paint schemes easily distinguishable against the series 1. it also uses a smaller carburettor

== Other models ==
Belgarda also produced in limited numbers TZR125R SPs which have varying swingarms and increased power ratings. It is said to be a 33bhp machine

The 4DL (Series 1) shares the same frame as some versions of the Yamaha TZR250 and was also used for the Yamaha Yamaha SZR660 Belgarda which uses a XT660 engine. with different engine mountings beautifully welded at the factory.

The TZR125R SP is based on the 4DL Series 1, distinguished by its adjustable forks and specific frame serial codes. While many SP models featured a black Deltabox frame, some were produced with a polished finish.

The SP engine utilizes cylinders with the 4DL-00 prefix, differing from the (R) and (RR) variants in porting architecture and timing. These cylinders feature additional ports, necessitating a dedicated CDI and specific engine management components. Production numbers for the SP version are unverified, though estimates typically range between 500 and 900 units.

Due to the model's rarity, various "SP-style" replicas exist. While some 4DL Series 1 frames have been painted black to mimic the SP aesthetic, the frames themselves are structurally identical across the Series 1 line.

The Swiss market 4DL are known as 4HE.

As with the previous generation, Yamaha has a number of variants: 4BN; 4CL; 4DL; 4FL; 4GM; 4HE; 4HW; 4HX; 4JB.
