= Yamaha DS7 =

Motorcycle

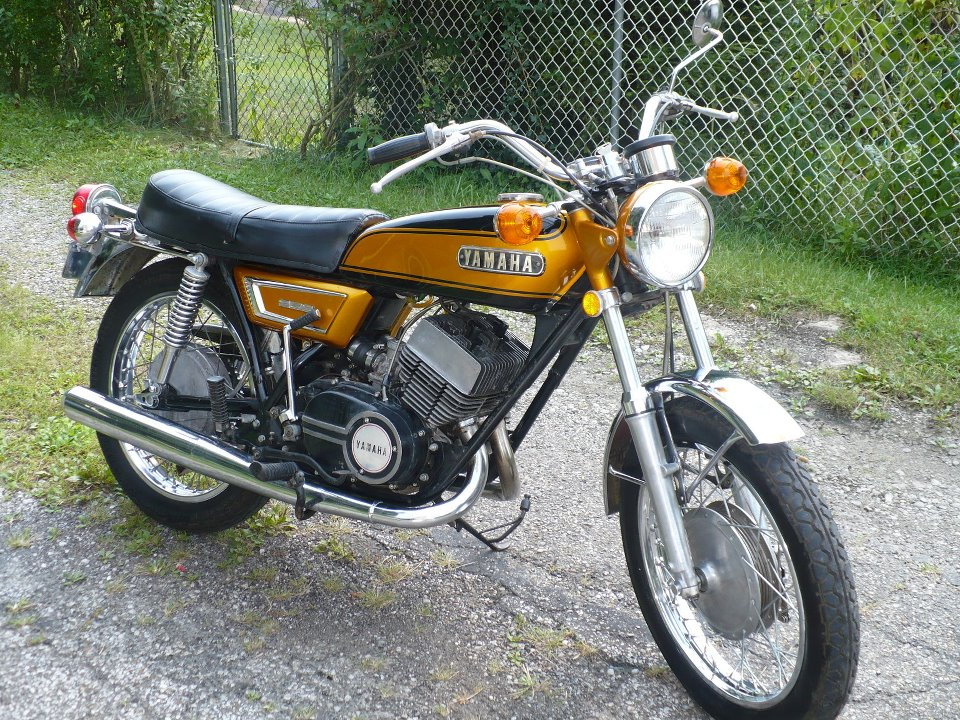
- 1972 Yamaha DS7
- Manufacturer: Yamaha
- Also called: Yamaha YDS7
- Production: 1970-1972
- Successor: Yamaha RD250
- Class: standard
- Engine: 247 cc (15.1 cu in) two-stroke twin
- Bore / stroke: 54 mm × 54 mm (2.1 in × 2.1 in)
- Power: 30 bhp (22 kW) @ 7500rpm

The Yamaha DS7 (or YDS7 in the UK) motorcycle was made from 1970 to 1972. A 250cc air-cooled twin two-stroke design includes a 12v battery ignition and a five-speed transmission. Making nearly 30 hp (22 kW) @ 7,500 r/min, the published top speed was 93 mph, with a 1/4 14.8 second quarter mile time.

The DS7 is the forerunner of the Yamaha RD motorcycle series started in 1973. The major difference between the DS7 / R5350 and 1973 RD250 / 350 is the induction design. The DS7 and R5 are piston-ported, whereas the RDs used reed valve induction. Two Mikuni VM26 round slide carburetors serve the air-fuel charge. The DS7 engine bore and stroke is 54 × 54 mm with cast iron lined aluminum cylinders. Each piston has two rings. The 5-speed, transmission uses a direct left foot gear change.

The DS7 includes oil injection, directly into the intake port. The fuel tank holds gasoline and oil is pumped from an oil tank beneath the seat. The DS7 brakes are TLS (twin leading shoe) front brakes and SLS (single leading shoe) rear brake.

Yamaha's DS7 design is based on racing Yamahas with frame and suspension that was reasonable for the period.

== See also ==
- List of Yamaha motorcycles
