= List of Yamaha three-wheeled all-terrain vehicles =

Yamaha YT125G Tri-Moto
- Manufacturer: Yamaha
- Production: 1980-1985
- Class: Recreation ATC
- Engine: 123 cc (7.5 cu in) air-cooled two-stroke single
- Bore / stroke: 56 x 50
- Compression ratio: 6.4:1
- Top speed: <30 Mph
- Torque: 7.2 ft-lbs@5000rpm
- Ignition type: CDI
- Transmission: Auto-clutch; 5-speed Chain Final Drive
- Frame type: Steel
- Suspension: None
- Brakes: Front: None; Rear: Drum
- Tires: 22 x 11 x 8
- Wheelbase: 44.1
- Dimensions: L: 69.7; W: 39.2
- Seat height: 27.2
- Weight: 243 (dry)
- Fuel capacity: 1.8gal
- Related: $1049 MSRP

Yamaha entered the three wheeler market in 1980. Yamaha started with 125cc recreational three wheeler that would remain the foundation of their line through 1985, the YT125 featured a 2 stroke engine with sealed airbox with snorkel intake, an autolube oil injection system, and featured a narrow tunnel above the engine that was advertised to make the machine easier to keep stable in precarious situations. Advertising pointed out the durability of the tires, at a time when Honda ATCs were still known for relatively weak low-pressure balloon tires.

Yamaha followed the YT125 with the introduction of the YT175 in 1982.

Yamaha YT175J Tri-Moto
- Manufacturer: Yamaha
- Production: 1982-1983
- Class: Recreation ATC
- Engine: 171 cc (10.4 cu in) air-cooled two-stroke single
- Bore / stroke: 66 x 50
- Compression ratio: 6.0:1
- Top speed: 50 Mph
- Torque: 12.3 ft-lbs@5500rpm
- Ignition type: CDI
- Transmission: Auto-clutch; 5-speed Chain Final Drive
- Frame type: Steel
- Suspension: Front: Telescopic Fork
- Brakes: Front: Drume; Rear: Enclosed Disc
- Tires: 22 x 11 x 8
- Wheelbase: 44.5
- Dimensions: L: 68.9; W: 39.2
- Seat height: 27.2
- Weight: 262 (dry)
- Fuel capacity: 1.8gal
- Oil capacity: 1.4q
- Related: $1299 MSRP

Yamaha YTM200EK Yamahauler
- Manufacturer: Yamaha
- Production: 1983-1984
- Class: Utility ATC
- Engine: 196.3 cc (11.98 cu in) air-cooled two-stroke single
- Bore / stroke: 67 x 55.7
- Compression ratio: 8.5:1
- Top speed: <40 Mph
- Torque: 10.6 ft-lbs@5000rpm
- Ignition type: CDI
- Transmission: Auto-clutch; 5-speed Shaft Final Drive
- Frame type: Steel
- Suspension: Front: Telescopic Fork w/100mm Travel
- Brakes: Front: Drum; Rear: Enclosed
- Tires: 25 x 12 x 9 Disc
- Wheelbase: 44.2
- Dimensions: L: 70; W: 41.3
- Seat height: 27.8
- Weight: 271 (dry)
- Fuel capacity: 2.4gal
- Oil capacity: 1.6q
- Related: $1449 MSRP

Yamaha YTM200K Tri-Moto
- Manufacturer: Yamaha
- Production: 1983-1985
- Class: Recreation ATC
- Engine: 196 cc (12.0 cu in) air-cooled two-stroke single
- Bore / stroke: 67 x 55.7
- Compression ratio: 8.5:1
- Top speed: <40 Mph
- Torque: 10.5 ft-lbs@5000rpm
- Ignition type: CDI
- Transmission: Auto-clutch; 5-speed w/Reverse; Chain Final Drive
- Frame type: Steel
- Suspension: None
- Brakes: Front: Drume; Rear: Enclosed Disc
- Tires: Front: 22 x 8 x 10; Rear: 22 x 11 x 8
- Wheelbase: 44.2
- Dimensions: L: 70.7; W: 39.0
- Seat height: 27.8
- Weight: 271 (dry)
- Fuel capacity: 2.2gal
- Oil capacity: 1.6q
- Related: $1399 MSRP

Yamaha YTM225DXK Tri-Moto
- Manufacturer: Yamaha
- Production: 1983-1985
- Class: Recreation ATC
- Engine: 223 cc (13.6 cu in) air-cooled two-stroke single
- Bore / stroke: 70 x 58
- Compression ratio: 8.8:1
- Top speed: <40 Mph
- Torque: 12.2 ft-lbs@5500rpm
- Ignition type: CDI
- Transmission: Auto-clutch; 5-speed Shaft Final Drive
- Frame type: Steel
- Suspension: Front: Telescopic Fork; Rear: Monoshock
- Brakes: Front: Drum; Rear: Enclosed Disc
- Tires: 22 x 11 x 8
- Wheelbase: 45.3
- Dimensions: L: 71.1; W: 40.2
- Seat height: 28.3
- Weight: 317.5 (dry)
- Fuel capacity: 2.38gal
- Oil capacity: 1.6q
- Related: $1849 MSRP

Yamaha YT60L Tri-Zinger
- Manufacturer: Yamaha
- Production: 1984
- Class: Recreation ATC
- Engine: 59 cc (3.6 cu in) air-cooled two-stroke single
- Bore / stroke: 44 x 39.2
- Compression ratio: 6.6:1
- Top speed: >30 Mph
- Torque: 3.6 ft-lbs@5000rpm
- Ignition type: CDI
- Transmission: Auto-clutch; Single Speed; Shaft Final Drive
- Frame type: Steel
- Suspension: Front: Telescopic Fork
- Brakes: Front: None; Rear: Drum
- Tires: 15 x 7 x 6
- Wheelbase: 33.9
- Dimensions: L: 51.2; W: 29.7
- Seat height: 19.3
- Weight: 110 (dry)
- Fuel capacity: 1.06gal
- Oil capacity: 0.85q
- Related: $599 MSRP

Yamaha YTZ250N Tri-Z
- Manufacturer: Yamaha
- Production: 1985-1986
- Class: Sport ATC
- Engine: 246 cc (15.0 cu in) Liquid-cooled two-stroke single
- Bore / stroke: 68 x 68
- Compression ratio: 7.7:1
- Top speed: 55+ Mph
- Ignition type: CDI
- Transmission: Manual clutch 5-speed Chain Final Drive
- Frame type: Steel
- Suspension: Front: Telescopic Fork; Monoshock
- Brakes: Front: Disc; Rear: Disc
- Tires: Front: 25 x 8 x 12; Rear: 22 x 11 x 8
- Wheelbase: 52.7
- Dimensions: L: 74
- Seat height: 29.5
- Weight: 315 (dry)
- Fuel capacity: 2.2gal
- Oil capacity: 1.10q
- Related: $2249 MSRP

Yamaha YTM225DRS Tri Moto
- Manufacturer: Yamaha
- Production: 1986
- Class: Recreation ATC
- Engine: 223 cc (13.6 cu in) Air-cooled four-stroke single
- Bore / stroke: 70 x 58
- Compression ratio: 8.8:1
- Top speed: >50 Mph
- Torque: 12.2 ft-lbs@5500rpm
- Ignition type: CDI
- Transmission: Auto-clutch; 5-speed w/Reverse; Shaft Final Drive
- Frame type: Steel
- Suspension: Front: Telescopic Fork; Monoshock
- Brakes: Front: Drum; Rear: Enclosed Disc
- Tires: 22 x 11 x 8
- Wheelbase: 45.3
- Dimensions: L: 71.1; W: 40.2
- Seat height: 28.3
- Weight: 326 (dry)
- Fuel capacity: 2.38gal
- Oil capacity: 1.6q
- Related: $2919 MSRP
