= Yamaha RD500LC =

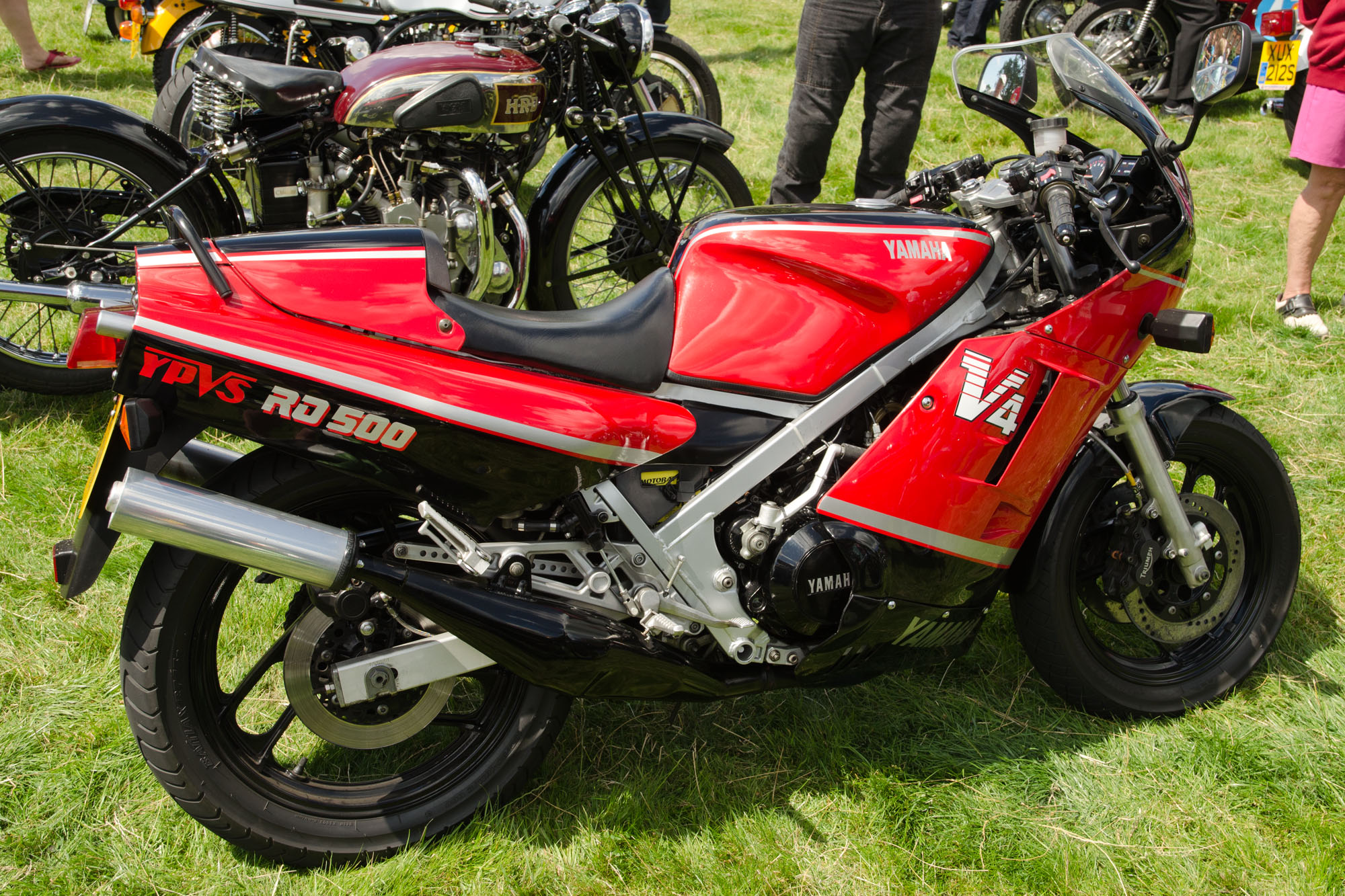
- Manufacturer: Yamaha
- Also called: RZ500; RZV500R
- Production: 1984–1986
- Class: Sports
- Engine: 499 cc liquid-cooled V4 two stroke
- Power: 64.2 kW (88 hp) @ 9,500 rpm
- Torque: 65.4 N·m @ 8,500 rpm
- Transmission: 6 speed
- Rake, trail: 26 degrees, 95 mm (3.7 in)
- Weight: 205 kg (452 lb) (dry)
- Related: Yamaha RD350LC

The Yamaha RD500LC is a high-performance, two-stroke sports motorcycle, also known as the RZ500 in Canada and Australia. A lightened but detuned version known as the RZV500R was developed for the Japanese home market. Strict United States Environmental Protection Agency regulations meant that the RZ500 was not available for sale in that country. Produced for a short period between 1984 and 1986 it has become a sought after collector's machine.

== Development ==
With the success in the early 1980s of Kenny Roberts and the Yamaha YZR500 in Grand Prix motorcycle racing Yamaha realised that a road going replica of their 500 cc racing machine would sell well. Using the similar technology of the smaller RD series of two-stroke motorcycles the RD500LC was launched in 1984.

== Design ==
=== Engine ===
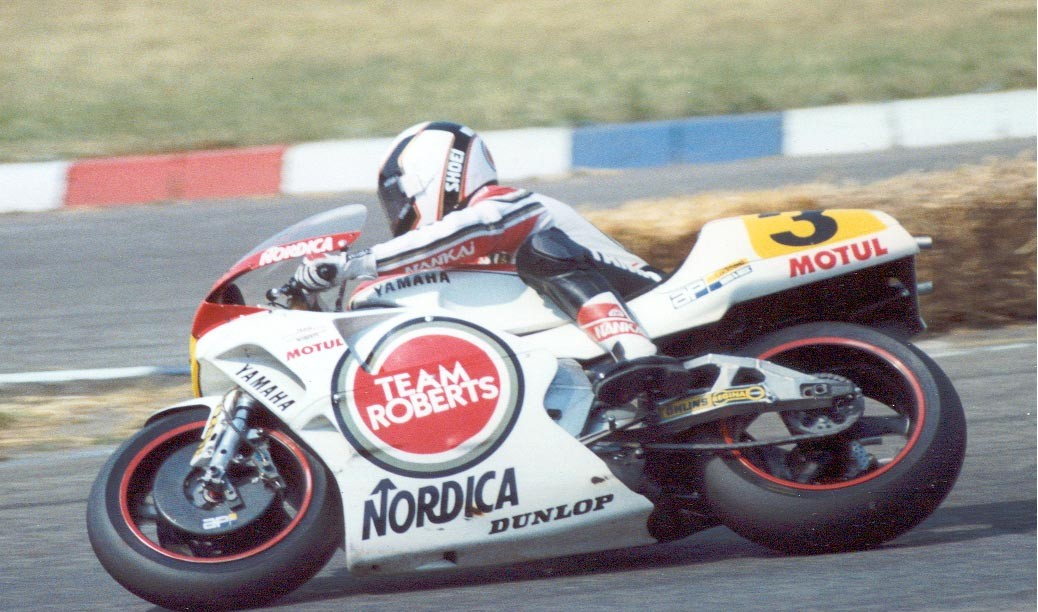
Yamaha YZR500

The RD500LC (Race Developed 500CC Liquid Cooled motorcycle) uses a 50-degree, twin-crankshaft V4 engine layout. Linked Yamaha YPVS exhaust power valves are controlled by a single electronic unit and servo motor and are designed to give a broader power band. The engine also features intake reed valves unlike the YZR500 racer which used rotary disc valve induction. The reed valves use two different intake arrangements, the lower cylinders are fed through crankcase mounted reeds; the upper pair use cylinder barrel mounted reeds. The four Mikuni carburettors are side mounted in pairs and feed each cylinder through 90 degree intake manifold. The lower expansion chambers exit normally but the upper pipes cross over each other just behind the exhaust ports to maintain the correct tuned length.

The dual crankshafts are geared directly to the clutch, while the front crankshaft also drives a counter balancer shaft mounted between the two crankshafts. The counterbalance shaft, unusual on a two-stroke, assists with damping engine vibrations. The engine is cooled by thermostatically controlled liquid cooling, an auxiliary electric fan mounted behind the radiator cuts in at quite high but acceptable working temperatures (e.g. when stationary in traffic). Lubrication is by direct injection into the inlet manifolds using Yamaha's 'Autolube' pump system. Normally controlled in other two-stroke engines by throttle position, the engine oil pump is controlled by the YPVS servo motor ensuring that the oil supply is not shut off at high engine revolutions.

=== Transmission ===
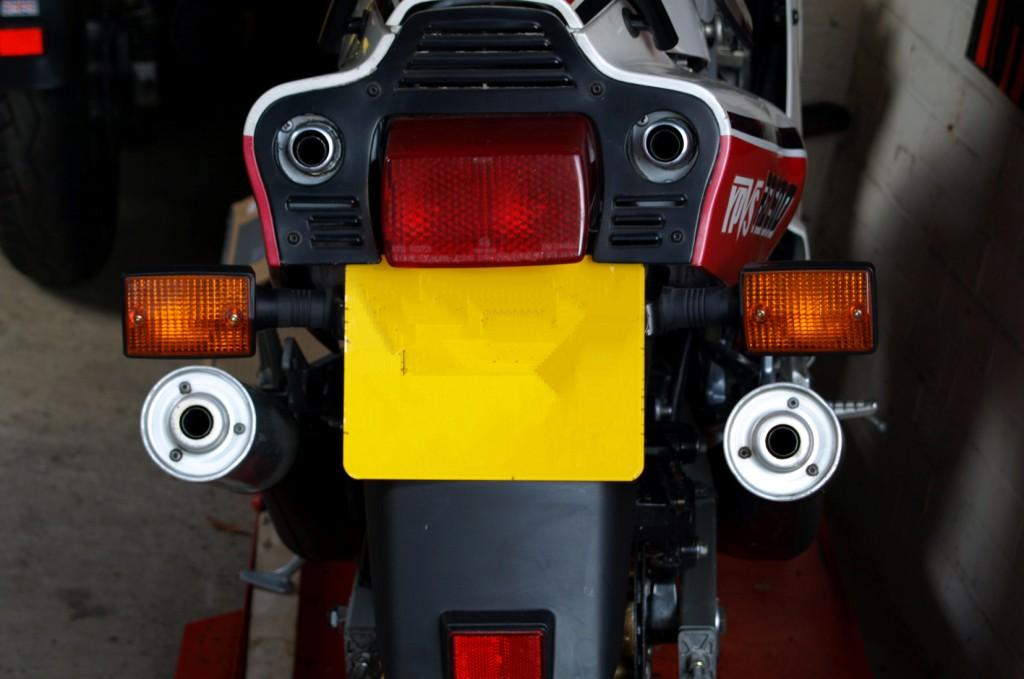
RD500LC rear view

The RD500LC uses a six-speed sequential close ratio gearbox with the usual road-going 'one down and five up' sequence, the gear shafts are removable from the right side of the engine without the need to split the crankcases. The clutch is of the wet, multiple-disc coil spring type and is cable operated. Unusually for a two-stroke engine the gears and outer crankshaft bearings are lubricated by a separate crankshaft driven trochoid oil pump. Final drive is by conventional for the time O-ring chain and sprockets.

=== Chassis ===
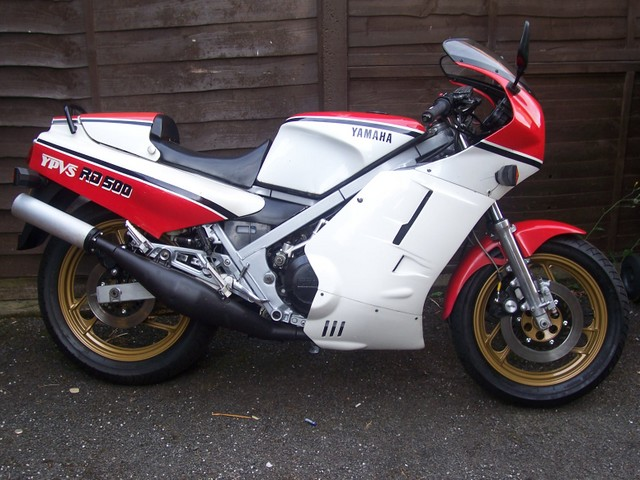
Yamaha RD500

The frame of the RD500LC is manufactured from mild steel box-section and uses a perimeter layout. The rear shock absorber is unusually placed horizontally under the engine and uses the lower crankcase as a mounting point. The under-seat area is occupied by the upper cylinder exhaust chambers, the oil pump and one-way valves, the battery and the YPVS (Yamaha Power Valve System) servo motor. The battery is of the 'wet' lead acid type and a cut-out is provided in the right side panel to view the acid levels without having to dismantle half the bike! The rear of the shock absorber connects to an extruded aluminium alloy swinging arm via several forged aluminium rocker arms. An unusually small diameter 16-inch wheel is held between 37 mm (1.5 in) spring and oil damped forks which featured adjustable anti-dive units.

The RD500LC uses twin ventilated disc brakes for the front wheel with a single ventilated disc at the rear. A solo seat cowl was originally provided to cover the pillion seat when not in use. The Japanese market RZV500R differs from the RD500 by not having a rear-mounted pillion grab handle fitted (which gives a cleaner, more race-oriented look to the motorcycle).

=== Electrical system ===
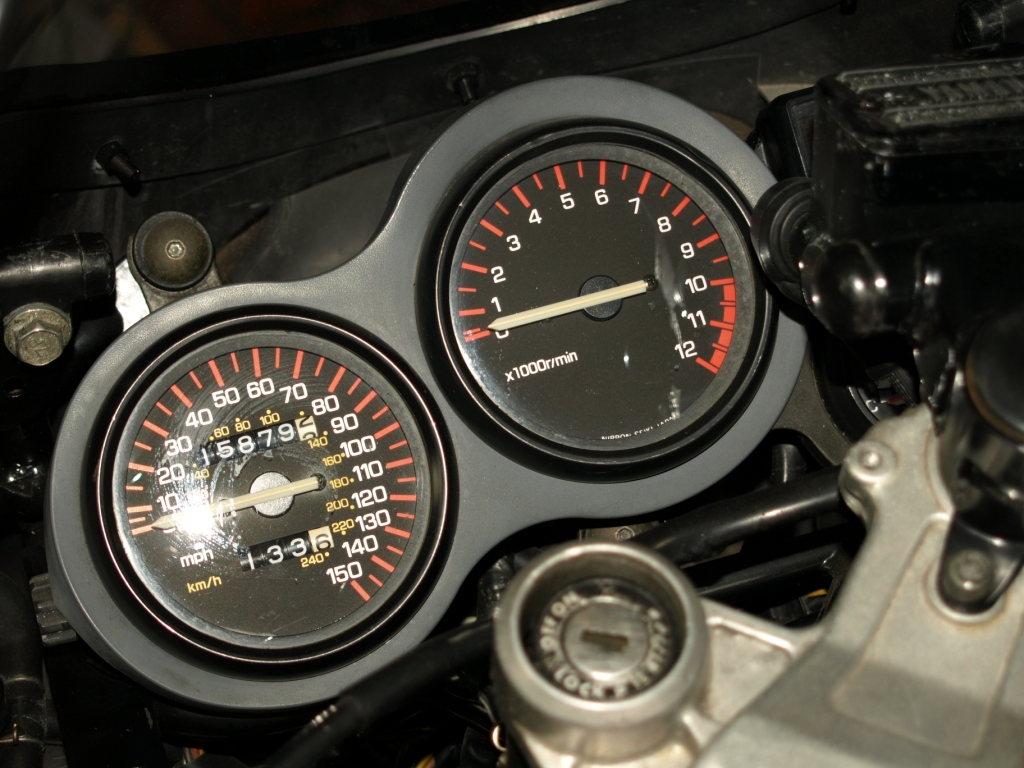
RD500LC Speedometer and Tachometer

The RD500LC features a standard 12-volt electrical system. Yamaha's self-cancelling indicator unit is used and a variable resistance gauging system is used to monitor two-stroke oil tank contents with associated warning lights. Nippondenso capacitor discharge ignition (CDI) is used in conjunction with two coils.

=== RZV500R ===
The RZV500R was designed exclusively for the Japanese home market although many have been exported privately. The RZV500R features upgraded parts not found on the standard RD500LC and RZ500. A major difference is the hand-welded aluminium frame, which is significantly lighter than the steel version used on standard models. The water temperature gauge also doubles as a fuel tank contents gauge at the push of a RHS lever (very useful feature given their fuel consumption) and the front-fork preload can be altered from the top of the forks. There is also a red light mounted within the tachometer housing that comes on at the equivalent of 55 mph (Japanese maximum national speed limit). The speedo is calibrated in km/h.

The front forks are air assisted with rebound damping adjustment. The rear brake and gear levers are cast from aluminium, as are the clip-on type handle bars. These chassis modifications added up to a weight saving of 20 lb (9.1 kg). The engine was detuned to 64 hp (48 kW) to comply with Japanese legislation. This was achieved by restricting the internal diameter of the exhaust pipes and changes to the carburettor jetting. These restrictions are easily changed to the RD500 specification by opening up the restrictor plates in the exhaust to create the same diameter hole as the exhaust pipes had as standard and the re-jetting of the carburetors to suit.

== Models by country ==
Differences mentioned are comparisons to the UK specification RD500LC, Yamaha model numbers are in brackets where known.

- Australia

RZ500N (53G)

- Austria

Front and rear yellow side reflectors

- Canada

RZ500S (1VW)

- Denmark

Self-retracting sidestand, right dip headlight

- Finland

Self-retracting side stand, extended rear mudguard, right dip headlight

- Germany

Reduced load capacity (205kg instead of 211kg), self-cancelling indicators deleted, right dip headlight

- Japan

RZV500R (51X)
Tachometer mounted red warning light that activates at the equivalent of 55mph. Hand-produced lightweight aluminium frame, fuel tank contents gauge activated by a rhs mounted function switch (uses water temp gauge to show fuel tank contents available), front suspension pre-load adjustable from dial on top of forks legs. Self-cancelling indicators deleted. Production run limited to 1600 units only (all sold in the first week of release allegedly)

- Norway

Self-retracting sidestand, suppressor spark plug caps, right dip headlight

- Sweden

Modified exhaust pipes, self-retracting sidestand, right dip headlight

- United Kingdom

RD500LC (47X early models - 1GE late models)

== Specifications (RD500LC/RZV500R) ==
	RD500LC	RZV500R
Engine	499 cc (30 cu in), 2-stroke, four-cylinder, liquid-cooled, reed valve induction with YPVS	
Bore Stroke	56.4 mm × 50.0 mm (2.22 in × 1.97 in)	
Compression Ratio	6.6:1	
Fuel System	Mikuni VM26SS 26 mm (1.0 in) carburettor x 4	
Lubrication	Yamaha Autolube two stroke injection, transmission gear pump.	
Ignition	Capacitor Discharge Ignition (CDI)	
Transmission	6-speed, constant mesh	
Final Drive	530 chain, 102 links	
Overall Length	2,085 mm (82.1 in)	
Overall Width	705 mm (27.8 in)	
Overall Height	1,145 mm (45.1 in)	
Seat Height	780 mm (30.7 in)	
Ground Clearance	145 mm (5.7 in)	
Wheelbase	1,375 mm (54.1 in)	
Dry Weight	205 kg (452 lb)	196 kg (432 lb)
Suspension Front	Telescopic, coil spring, non adjustable spring preload, brake linked anti-dive system	Telescopic, air assisted coil spring, adjustable spring preload, adjustable rebound damping with brake linked anti-dive system
Suspension Rear	Link-type, gas/oil damped, 5-way adjustable spring preload, 4-way adjustable rebound damping	
Brakes Front	Dual hydraulic disc	
Brakes Rear	Single hydraulic disc	
Tires Front	120/80-VR16	
Tires Rear	130/80-VR18	
Fuel Tank Capacity	22 L (6 US gal; 5 imp gal)	

== Motorsport ==
The bike won the Castrol Six Hour race in 1984.

== See also ==
- List of Yamaha motorcycles
