= Yamaha Banshee 350 =

Overview
- Production: 1987–2012

The Banshee 350 (YFZ350) is an all-terrain vehicle, produced by Yamaha Motor Company. It was manufactured in Japan from 1987 through 2012. They were available in the United States from 1987 to 2006, in Canada until 2008 and in Australia from 1998 until 2012. The Banshee utilized a two-stroke twin-cylinder non-powervalve system version of Yamaha's RZ350.

== Specifications ==
Engine
Bore x Stroke: 64mm x 54mm
Displacement: 347cc
Compression Ratio: 6.5:1
Drive Train: RWD; Sealed O-Ring Chain
Fuel Delivery: Dual Mikuni 26mm
Ignition: CDI
Starting System: Kick
Transmission: 6-Speed Manual
Fuel: Gasoline

Transmission

primary ratio: 66/23, 2.869

Transmission 1st gear ratio: 32/13, 2.461
Transmission 2nd gear ratio: 29/16, 1.812
Transmission 3rd gear ratio: 27/18, 1.500
Transmission 4th gear ratio: 25/20, 1.260
Transmission 5th gear ratio: 23/22, 1.045
Transmission 6th gear ratio: 21/24, 0.875
Transmission final ratio: 42/13, 3.230

Chassis
Brakes / Front: Dual Hydraulic Disc
Brakes / Rear: Hydraulic Disc
Suspension / Front: Independent Double Wishbone, 9.1" w/ 5-way Preload Adjustment
Suspension / Rear: Swingarm with Linkage, 8.7" w/ Rebound, Expansion and Threaded Preload Adjustment
Tires / Front: AT18 x 7-10
Tires / Rear: AT20 x 10-9

Dimensions
Dry Weight: 386 Lbs.
Fuel Capacity: 3.2 Gallons
Ground Clearance: 5.3"
L x W x H: 73.0" x 43.3" x 42.5"
Seat Height: 31.5"
Wet Weight: 405 Lbs.
Wheelbase: 50.4"

Other
Lighting: Dual 35W Halogen Headlights & 21/5W Brake light

== Post-2006 production ==
Despite not being sold new in the United States after 2006, Banshees were still available in Canada for the 2007 and 2008 model years, and Middle-East GCC or Australia up to 2012.
