= Two-stroke power valve system =

Type of two-stroke engine

The two-stroke power valve system is an improvement to a conventional two-stroke engine that gives a high power output over a wider RPM range.

== Operation of a two-stroke engine ==
A stroke is the action of a piston travelling the full length of its cylinder. In a two-stroke engine, one of the two strokes combines primarily the intake stroke and the combustion stroke, while the other stroke primarily combines the compression stroke and the exhaust stroke, though technically since both ports are exposed during both the combustion and compression strokes, some reversion does occur.

As the piston travels upward in the cylinder, it creates low pressure area in the crankcase; this draws fresh air and atomized fuel from the carburetor through a hole in the cylinder wall or directly into the crankcase. As the piston continues travelling upward, transfer ports and the exhaust ports are closed off, thus trapping the combustible mixture in the combustion chamber. As the piston reaches the top of the cylinder, the mixture in the cylinder is compressed to the point of ignition.

The second stroke begins once ignition has taken place. The power stroke begins after the air-fuel mixture is ignited. The burnt fuel creates pressure in the cylinder above the piston and forces it downward. As the piston passes the midpoint of the downstroke, the exhaust port to the side of the cylinder is uncovered and initiates the flow of burned fuel into the expansion chamber or muffler.

The piston then moves downward, where the air-fuel mixture remains from the previous intake-compression stroke. Shortly after the exhaust port is uncovered by the downward travel of the piston, the transfer ports begin to be uncovered. The transfer ports act as a passage through which the air-fuel mixture moves from the crankcase into the cylinder above the piston. Once the piston reaches the bottom of the stroke, the second stroke is completed and the process is repeated.

== Engineering design improvements ==
The only moving parts inside simple two-stroke engines are the crankshaft, the connecting rod, and the piston. It is the same simplicity in design, however, that causes a two-stroke engine to be less fuel-efficient and produce high specific levels of undesirable exhaust gas emissions. At the bottom of the power stroke, the transfer ports, which deliver fresh fuel-air mixture, are open at the same time as the exhaust port. This can allow a significant amount of fresh fuel to run straight through the engine without being burned in the process of power production. Properly designed exhaust systems help minimize the amount of raw fuel loss in the exhaust process, but a carbureted two-stroke engine will always waste some fuel (modern direct injected engines avoid this).

Many producers of two-stroke performance bikes fit them with the exhaust power valve systems. These valves act to vary the height (and width) of the exhaust port thereby broadening power delivery over a wider rev range. Exhaust ports with fixed dimensions only produce usable power in a narrow rev range, which also affects fuel consumption and emissions.

In a race bike, this is not a problem as the engine will be operating at high RPM almost all the time. However, in a road/commuter bike, the limited power range is a problem. To provide more low RPM power, as well as enable the engine to produce a lot of high RPM power, a power valve system is used.

All power valve systems vary the duration of the exhaust port open time, which gives the engine usable low end power combined with excellent top end power. Manufacturers have also included sub exhaust chambers that extend the 'tuned length' of the expansion chamber.

Power valve actuation can be by mechanical (RPM dependent) or electric (servo motor) means increasingly with electronic control. Electronic control offers a greater degree of accuracy as well as being able to vary the opening of the valve and be tuned to conditions.

=== Suzuki AETC and Super AETC ===
AETC and Super AETC Suzuki engines, Automatic Exhaust Timing Control: The two-blade version was fitted to the VJ21 RGV250, and the three-blade version, to the VJ22 RGV250 and Suzuki RG150.

With the AETC system, the power-valve systems are normally partially closed at low RPM; when closed, it enables the engine to make more power. Up to a certain point, however, power drops off as the engine is unable to expel enough gases out of the exhaust. When the power-valve is opened, it allows more gases to flow out of the exhaust port. This system is recognizable by a small box above the exhaust outlet; the power-valves are situated in this box. Depending on the valve, they may be made of two (older version) or three (newer version) separate blades.

=== YPVS-Yamaha Power Valve System ===
YPVS is the Yamaha Power Valve System: Yamaha engineers realized that by altering the height of the exhaust port they could effectively change the engine power delivery thereby having optimal power and torque across the entire rev range, so it was that the YPVS was born. The valve is of a cylindrical "cotton reel" design running across the top of the exhaust port, it is turned by a servo motor controlled from a control box taking information from the CDI (and other locations). The valve is a slightly oval shape. This changes the height and size of the exhaust port at different engine speeds, maximizing the available power at all rev ranges, opening up firstly at 3k rpm for low end power, gradually in between 3-6k, fully opening at 6k rpm for maximum power, on most 125cc. It was fitted to all of the later models of the RZ/RD two-stroke road bikes (125, 250, 350 and 500 cc), the TZR range. It was also added to the DT(125lc 2/3) range after 1984 (but was locked closed to comply with UK learner regulations until the (R) in 1988-04 (which had a fully functional YPVS valve) the DT125R has a better design of engine, although not much altered in speed, just more reliable than its predecessor. The YPVS was introduced to the motocross world in 1982 in the YZ125 and YZ250 motocross bikes, and is still currently in use. Yamaha used both rotary and guillotine type power valves, all controlled mechanically by RPM speed. The YPVS is only found on liquid-cooled bikes, not air cooled versions. Yamaha have also used a guillotine version in some of their later models road bikes such as the 1994 TZR250 3XV SP model, and many later TZ road race bikes. The TZR250R 3XV SPR actually uses a Triple-YPVS, which is a combination of the guillotine and "cotton reel" designs.

Yamaha was actually the first company to produce consistent results with their YPVS in their race bikes. The 1977 OW35K was the first race bike to incorporate the power valve system and it won the Finnish GP in 1977. The Kadenacy effect was harnessed and controlled to a point that gave Yamaha great advantage over all the other manufacturers throughout the late '70s and into the mid '80s. The first street bikes with YPVS were the RZ/RD350 YPVS (LC2-onwards), and RZ/RD500 GP Replica in 1983–84.

=== Honda ATAC ===
ATAC System: The Honda Automatic Torque Amplification Chamber system works by effectively increasing or decreasing the volume of the exhaust system with a small butterfly valve located just before the exhaust connection. At low RPM a centrifugal crankshaft driven gear opens the valve into a small chamber and increases the volume of the exhaust by allowing the exhaust gases to flow through the chamber. At high RPM the ATAC valve is closed and the exhaust simply exits into the expansion chamber. A larger expansion chamber allows for more power at lower RPMs because of the extra time needed for the impulse to "bounce" back for the supercharger effect. It was used on their CR motocrossers, GP bikes and MTX, MVX, NS and NSR road bikes.

=== Honda Power Port valve ===
HPP valve. A centrifugal governor opens and closes a two-blade exhaust valve (using over 50 parts)

=== Honda V-TACS ===
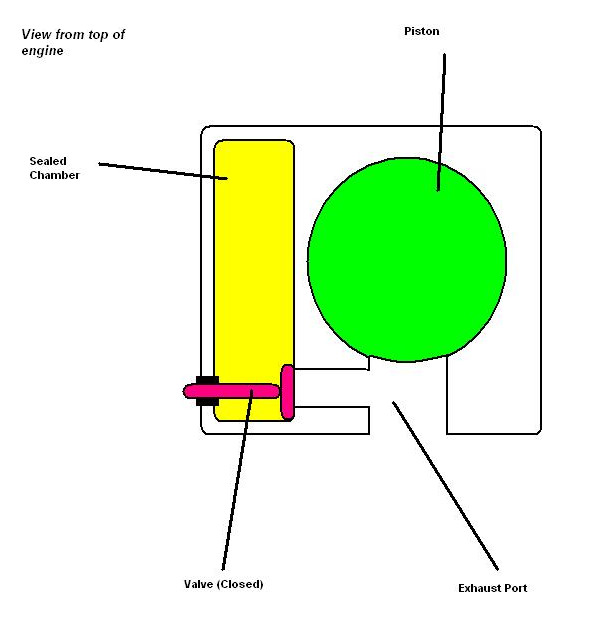

The "V-TACS" - Variable Torque Amplification Chamber System - works differently from the "ATAC system" and it will only work when it is used in conjunction with a tuned muffler. Tuned mufflers/expansion chambers increase power but only at the RPM they are designed for and can actually cause a power loss outside their tuned RPM. "V-TACS system" takes advantage of using an expansion chamber without losing power outside the expansion chamber's tuned RPM. Within the head and cylinder of the engine, there is a chamber that is sealed by a valve. This sealed chamber is vented onto the exhaust port when the valve is open. At low RPM this valve is open, this has the effect of increasing the exhaust manifold volume and negating the power loss that would normally be apparent at low RPM with an expansion chamber. At mid RPM the valve is closed, this enables the expansion chamber to work. It is identified by the head and cylinder, being much larger than normal for its displacement, the cylinder wall is also cast with the wording VTACS on it.

V-TACS was a foot-operated power valve system made by Honda on some of its small two-stroke bikes and scooters, like the Honda FC50.

=== Honda RC-Valve ===
The Honda Revolution Control valve is designed and works in principle like the "AETC system." A small computer monitors engine RPM and adjusts a two-blade exhaust valve with an electric servo. Honda equipped many two-stroke motorcycles such as the NSR125 and NSR250 models with RC - Valve power plants.

=== Kawasaki KIPS ===
Kawasaki uses a power-valve system called KIPS (Kawasaki Integrated Power Valve System) on their two-stroke bikes. The KIPS utilizes both alterations in port height, closing of the secondary port ducting, and a resonant chamber. KIPS is operated by a mechanical governor on single cylinder machines. The twin cylinder and newer single cylinder model bikes have an electric motor transferring movement via cable and linkages called E-KIPS.
