= Yamaha MT-10 =

Standard motorcycle

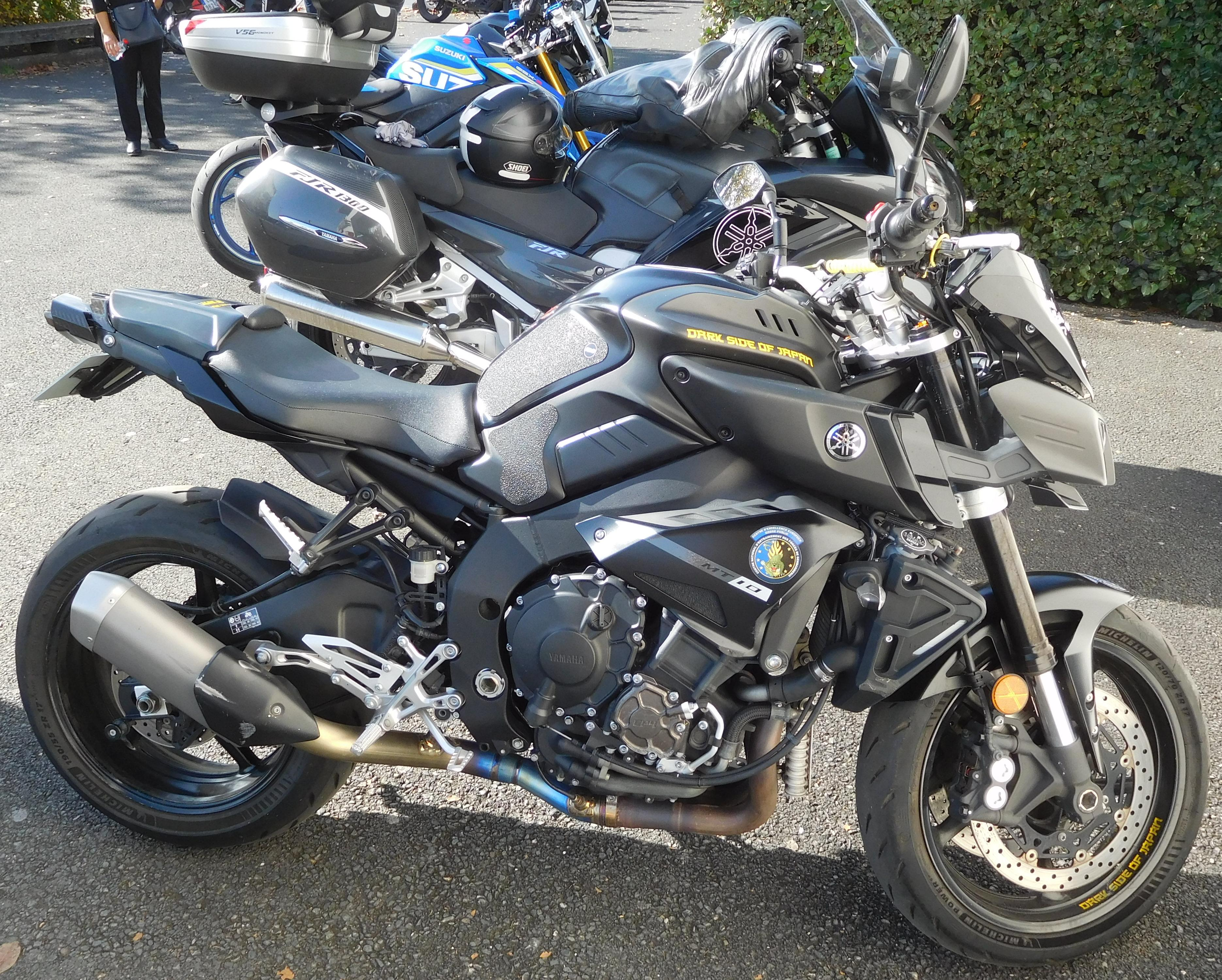
- 2016 Yamaha MT-10
- Manufacturer: Yamaha Motor Company
- Also called: Yamaha FZ-10 (North America; 2016–2017)
- Parent company: Yamaha Corporation
- Production: 2016-present
- Assembly: Japan
- Predecessor: Yamaha FZ1
- Class: standard
- Engine: 998 cc (60.9 cu in) liquid-cooled 4-stroke 16-valve DOHC inline-four with crossplane crankshaft
- Bore / stroke: 79.0 mm × 50.9 mm (3.1 in × 2.0 in)
- Compression ratio: 12.0:1
- Power: 118 kW (158.2 hp; 160.4 PS) @ 11,500 rpm (claimed); 97.8 kW (131.2 hp; 133.0 PS) @ 9,700 rpm (rear wheel)
- Torque: 111 N⋅m (82 lbf⋅ft) @ 9,000 rpm (claimed); 98.6 N⋅m (72.7 lbf⋅ft) @ 9,300 rpm (rear wheel)
- Ignition type: TCI
- Transmission: 6-speed constant mesh
- Frame type: Aluminum twin-spar (Deltabox)
- Suspension: Front: Inverted 43 mm (1.7 in) telescopic fork; Rear: Aluminum swingarm (link type)
- Brakes: Front: 4-piston caliper with dual 320 mm (12.6 in) discs; Rear: Single-piston caliper with single 220 mm (8.7 in) disc
- Tires: Front: 120/70-17 (tubeless); Rear: 190/55-17 (tubeless)
- Rake, trail: 24°, 102 mm (4.0 in)
- Wheelbase: 1,400 mm (55.1 in)
- Dimensions: L: 2,095 mm (82.5 in); W: 800 mm (31.5 in); H: 1,110 mm (43.7 in)
- Seat height: 825 mm (32.5 in)
- Weight: 209–212 kg (461–467 lb) (wet)
- Fuel capacity: 17 L (3.7 imp gal; 4.5 US gal)
- Oil capacity: 3.9 L (0.9 imp gal; 1.0 US gal)
- Related: Yamaha MT-07/FZ-07; Yamaha MT-09/FZ-09; Yamaha YZF-R1

The Yamaha MT-10 (called FZ-10 in North America until 2017) is a standard motorcycle made by Japanese motorcycle manufacturer Yamaha in their MT motorcycle series, first sold in 2016. It was introduced at the 2015 EICMA in Milan, Italy. It is the flagship member of the MT range from Yamaha. The crossplane engine is based on the 2015 YZF-R1 but re-tuned to focus on low to mid-range torque. It features a number of significant technical changes including newly designed intake, exhaust and fueling systems. It produces a claimed 118 kW (158.2 hp; 160.4 PS) @ 11,500 rpm and 111 N⋅m (82 lbf⋅ft) @ 9,000 rpm. It replaced the fourteen-year old FZ1 as the flagship bike in Yamaha's sport naked range.

The bike had non-functional V-Max-like air scoops from 2016 until 2021; however, with the 2022 redesign, they became functional ram-air scoops.

In October 2016, Yamaha released the MT-10 SP (for Europe only), which includes some upgrades such as Öhlins electronic racing suspension derived from the YZF-R1M, full-colour TFT LCD instrument panel, and an exclusive color scheme. For 2018, the bike is now designated MT-10 in all markets.

== Related Models ==
Shun Miyazawa said buyers are moving away from the supersport bikes, adding, "(Yamaha) aim to create an older and younger brother and cousins (to the MT-09) - maybe the same capacity, but a slightly different concept". This was translated into the creation of the MT-07 (FZ-07 in North America), the XSR700, the XSR900 and the MT-10 (FZ-10 in North America). The MT-10 is using the same engine from R1, albeit detuned from the factory.
