= Yamaha YZF-R9 =

Sport motorcycle

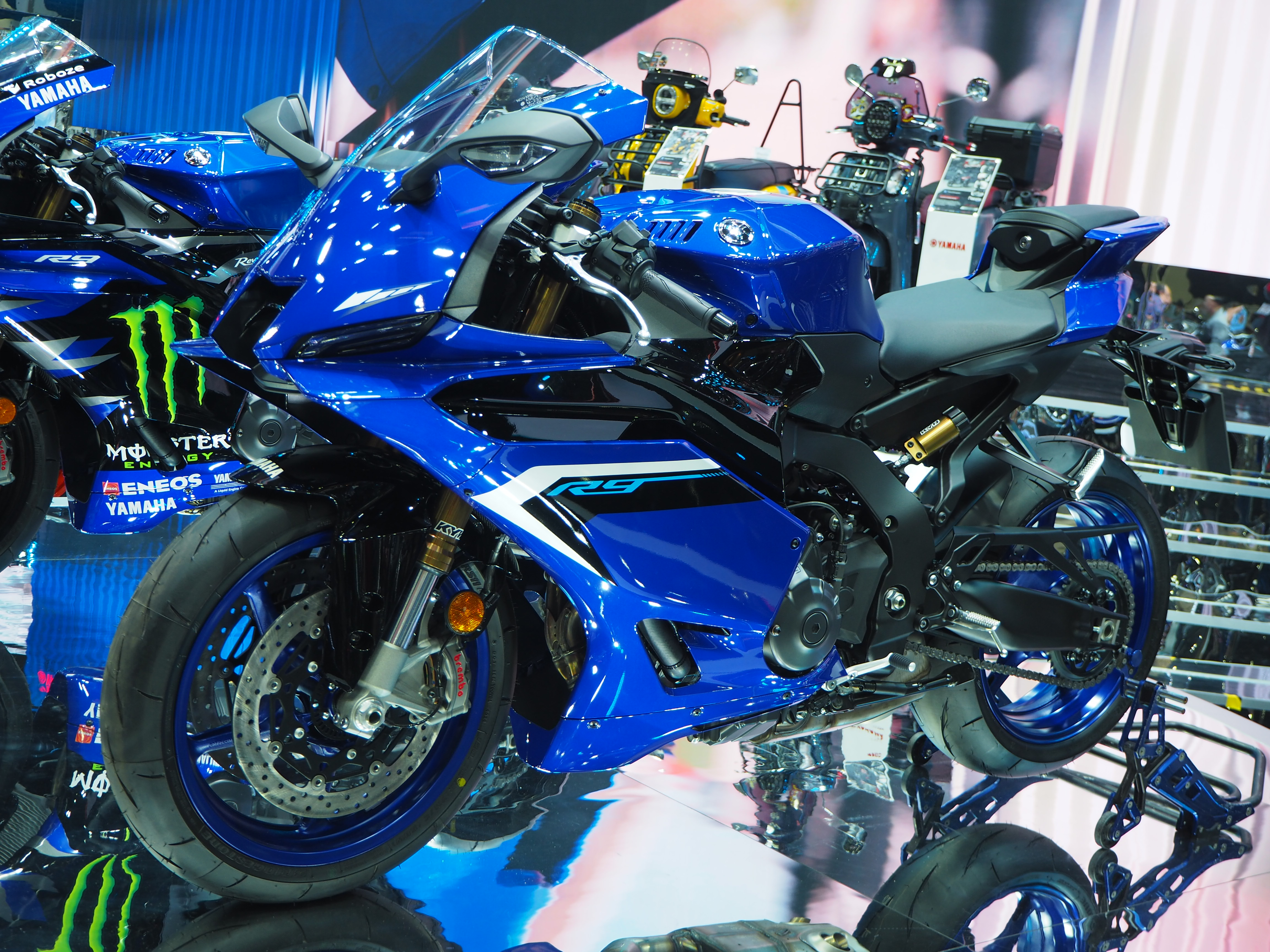
- 2025 Yamaha YZF-R9
- Manufacturer: Yamaha Motor Company
- Also called: Yamaha R9
- Production: 2025–present
- Predecessor: Yamaha YZF-R6
- Class: Sport bike
- Engine: 890cc CP3 liquid-cooled 4-stroke 12-valve DOHC inline-three
- Bore / stroke: 78 mm × 62.1 mm (3.1 in × 2.4 in)
- Compression ratio: 11.5:1
- Power: 87.5 kW (117.3 hp; 119.0 PS) @ 10,000 rpm
- Torque: 93 N⋅m (69 lbf⋅ft) @ 7,000 rpm
- Transmission: 6-speed constant mesh; multiplate with assist and slipper wet clutch
- Frame type: Deltabox aluminum alloy
- Suspension: F: 43 mm (1.7 in) KYB inverted telescopic fork R: KYB monoshock
- Brakes: F: Dual 320mm hydraulic discs with ABS; R: 220mm hydraulic disc with ABS
- Rake, trail: 22.6°, 94 mm (3.7 in)
- Wheelbase: 1,420 mm (56 in)
- Dimensions: L: 2,070 mm (81 in); W: 706 mm (27.8 in)
- Seat height: 831 mm (32.7 in)
- Weight: 179 kg (395 lb) (dry); 195 kg (430 lb) (wet)
- Fuel capacity: 14 L (3.1 imp gal; 3.7 US gal)
- Related: Yamaha MT-09; Yamaha XSR900; Yamaha Tracer 900

The Yamaha YZF-R9 is a 890 cc (54 cu in) sport bike of the YZF-R Series manufactured by Yamaha since 2025.

== Design and market introduction ==
Yamaha unveiled the YZF-R9 on 9 October 2024, as an all-new supersport model to the YZF-R Series. The front-end design follows a similar pattern to the new generation of YZF-R7—with a central LED headlight, and narrower, slanted position lights on each side. The blinkers are located on the side mirrors, similar to the R1.

The bike features winglets beneath both lights, designed to reduce front-end lift. Additionally, straight-line front-end lift is reduced by 6–7%, with cornering lift being reduced up to 10%. This makes the R9 more aerodynamically efficient than the senior YZF-R6.

On 25 October 2024, Yamaha held an open-air press conference at the Suzuka Circuit—during the All Japan Road Race Championship weekend—where R9 display models were shown to the public. The YZF-R9 was developed in response to the higher performance and financial barriers associated with legacy supersport models such as the R1 and R6. While maintaining supersport-level performance, it is intended to offer more capable road-use, similar to the R7.

== Engine and electronics ==
The YZF-R9 shares its engine with the MT-09, XSR900 and Tracer 900—the Yamaha 890cc (54 cu in) CP3 inline-three engine, which makes approximately 117 horsepower.

Yamaha introduced new sets of electronics with the R9, including a four-level Power Delivery Mode, a nine-level lean-sensitive Traction Control System and Slide Control System, as well as a three-level Lift Control System and Launch Control. The bike also incorporates a 5-inch full-color TFT display, which allows easier navigation through settings and electronics.

== Motorcycle racing ==
Yamaha brought the R9 as a direct replacement for the older YZF-R6 in the Supersport World Championship, which had been Yamaha's preferred middleweight motorcycle for over 20 years. During the final round of the 2024 Supersport World Championship at Jerez, the R9 was unveiled and revealed as Yamaha's supersport model for the 2025 Supersport season onward—following the recent displacement variation in the class.

Stefano Manzi claimed the 2025 Supersport World Championship aboard the YZF-R9 in its debut year.
