= Yamaha MT-09 =

Standard motorcycle

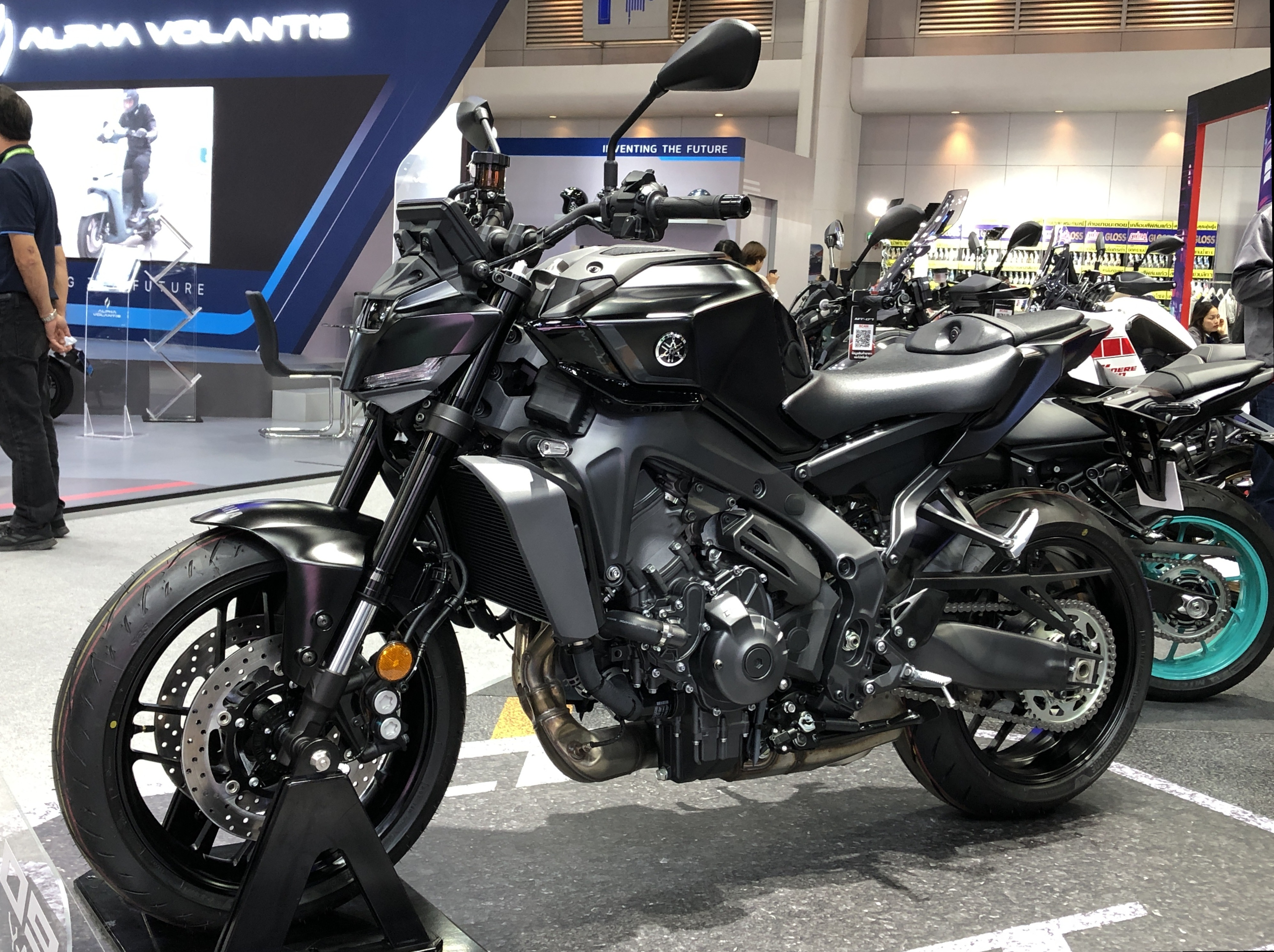
- 2024 Yamaha MT-09
- Manufacturer: Yamaha Motor Company
- Also called: Yamaha FZ-09 (North America; 2014–2017)
- Parent company: Yamaha Corporation
- Production: 2014–present
- Assembly: Japan
- Predecessor: Yamaha FZ8
- Class: Naked bike; Standard
- Engine: 847.2–890.2 cc (51.70–54.32 cu in) liquid-cooled 4-stroke 12-valve DOHC inline-three
- Bore / stroke: 78 mm × 62.1 mm (3.1 in × 2.4 in) (2021–present); 78 mm × 59.1 mm (3.1 in × 2.3 in) (2014–2020)
- Compression ratio: 11.5:1
- Power: 87.5 kW (117.3 hp; 119.0 PS) @ 10,000 rpm; 77.7 kW (104.2 hp; 105.6 PS) @ 9,940 rpm (rear wheel)
- Torque: 93 N⋅m (69 lbf⋅ft) @ 7,000 rpm; 82 N⋅m (60 lbf⋅ft) @ 8,360 rpm (rear wheel)
- Transmission: 6-speed constant mesh
- Suspension: Front: Inverted 41 mm (1.6 in) telescopic fork with adjustable preload and rebound, 137 mm (5.4 in) travel; Rear: Swingarm with monoshock, adjustable preload and rebound, 130 mm (5.1 in) travel
- Rake, trail: 25°, 104 mm (4.1 in)
- Wheelbase: 1,440 mm (56.7 in)
- Seat height: 820 mm (32.3 in)
- Weight: 188 kg (414 lb) (claimed) (wet)
- Fuel capacity: 14 L (3.1 imp gal; 3.7 US gal)
- Related: Yamaha XSR900; Yamaha YZF-R9; Yamaha Tracer 900

The Yamaha MT-09 is a street motorcycle of the MT series with an 847–890 cc (51.7–54.3 cu in) liquid-cooled four-stroke 12-valve DOHC inline-three engine with crossplane crankshaft and a lightweight cast alloy frame. For 2018, the bike is now designated MT-09 in all markets.

== Design and development ==
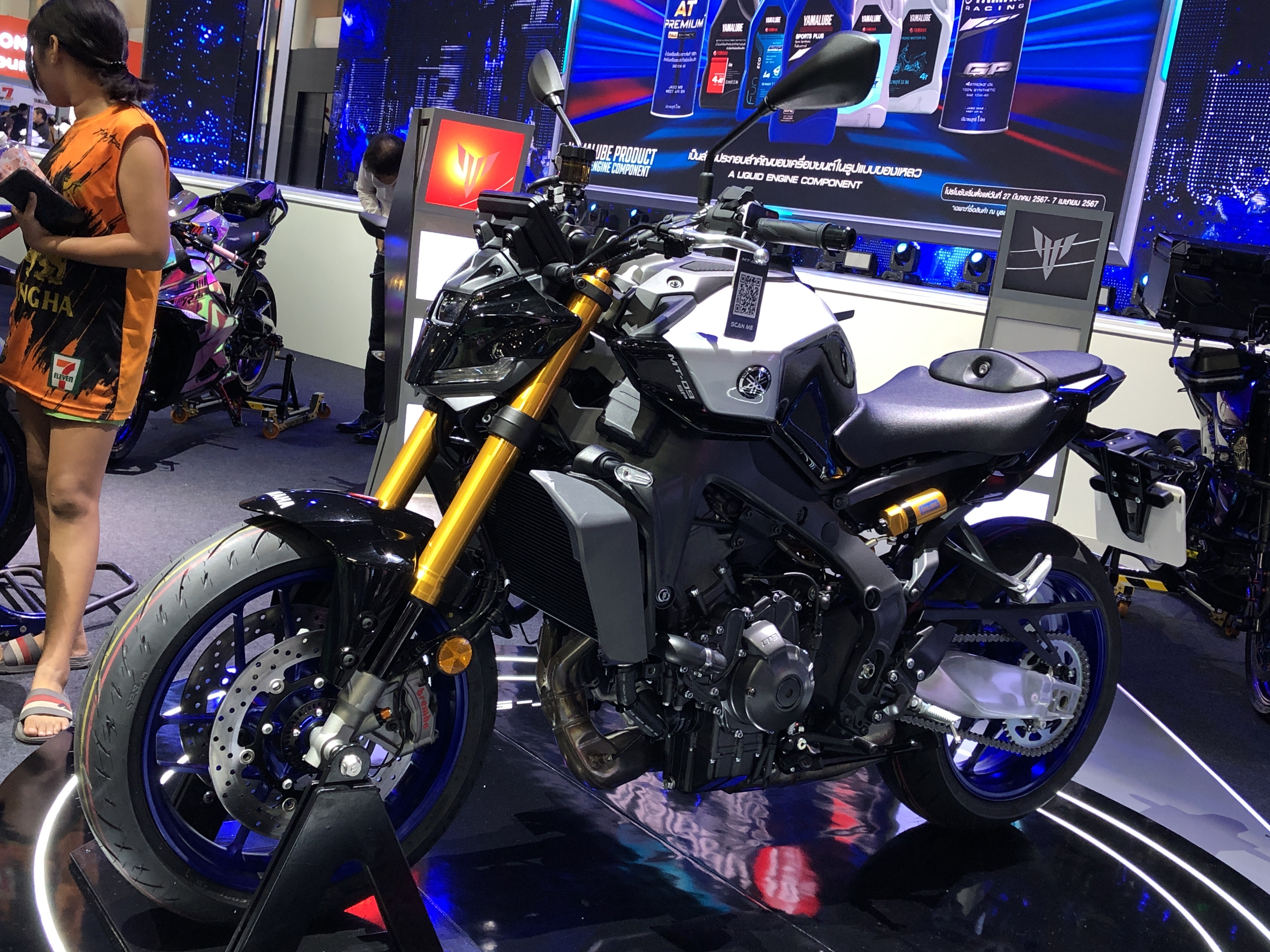
2024 Yamaha MT-09 SP

The MT-09 competes against the Triumph Street Triple, Kawasaki Z900, and MV Agusta Brutale 800. It is intended to restore Yamaha's fortunes, as the factory has in recent years lost its reputation for innovation. The MT-09's product manager, Shun Miyazawa, said Yamaha had considered parallel-twins, inline-threes, inline-fours, and V-twins, but that the inline-three gave the "best solution" of power, torque, and low weight. Comparing the MT-09 to the Street Triple, he said the Triumph was a streetfighter, but the Yamaha was a "roadster motard".

Both the frame and the double-sided swingarm are made of lightweight alloy, which are cast in two pieces. The frame castings are bolted together at the headstock and at the rear, but the swingarm parts are welded together. The MT-09 is Yamaha's first inline-three motorcycle since the XS750 and XS850, which were produced from 1976 to 1981, marking a return to the configuration after a long hiatus.

In 2017, the MT-09 was updated with fully adjustable suspension, traction control, antilock brakes, slipper clutch, LED headlights, and updated styling.

In October 2020, the MT-09 received the second update with a larger 890 cc (54 cu in) engine.

== Tracer 900/FJ-09/MT-09 Tracer ==
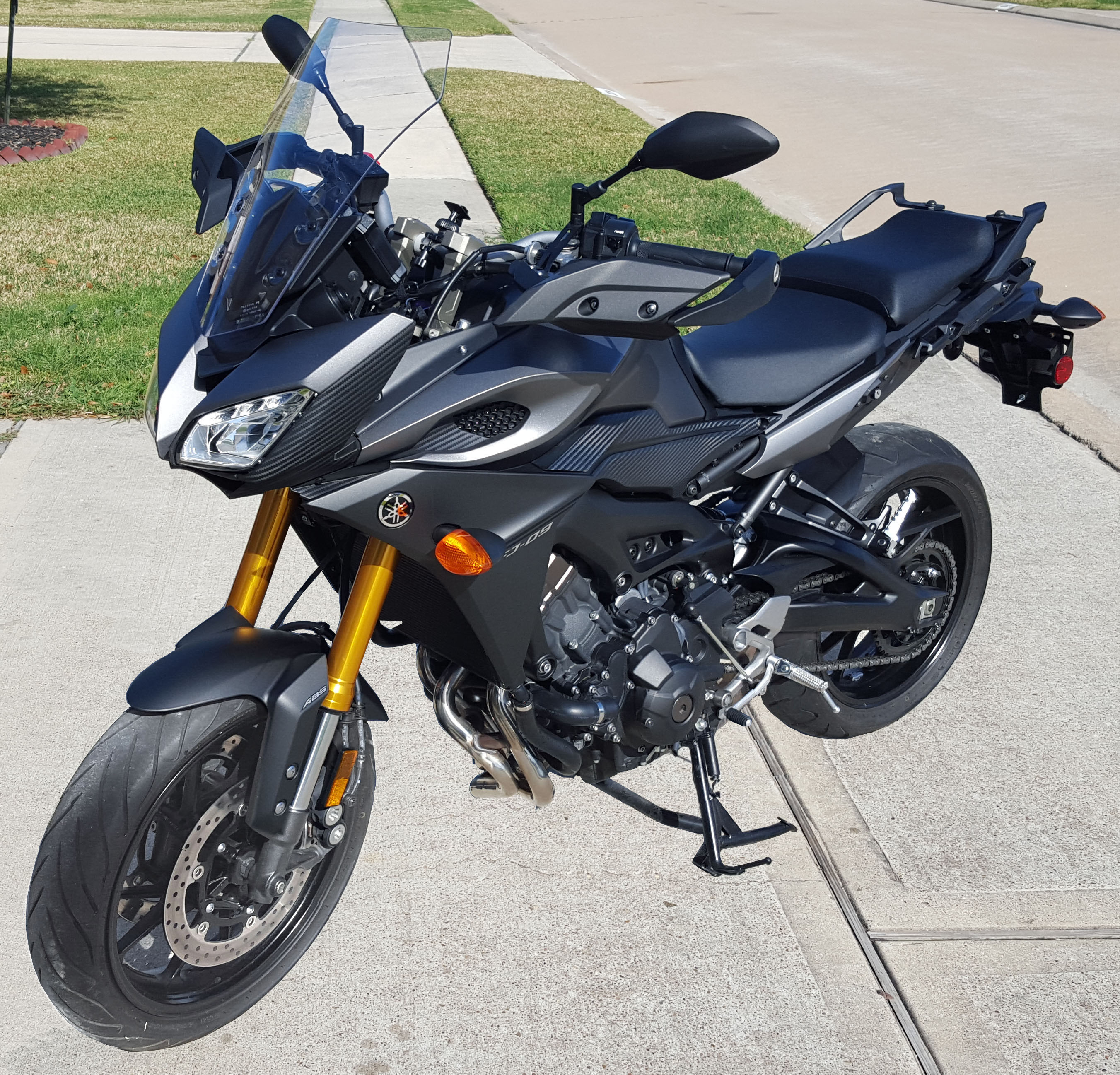
Yamaha Tracer 900

The Tracer 900 (FJ-09 in North America) is a sport touring model introduced in 2015 based on the MT-09. From 2016, in Europe and the United Kingdom, the name changed to Tracer 900 from MT-09 Tracer. It differs from the MT-09 in a number of ways, including that it has a partial fairing, a larger fuel tank, ABS brakes, handguards, centerstand, a 12-volt power socket, traction control, revised fuel map, drive-by-wire throttle mapping with three selectable riding modes. The display is very similar to the XT1200Z Super Ténéré's. It also has LED headlights and taillight.

== Related models ==
Shun Miyazawa said buyers are moving away from the supersport bikes, adding, "(Yamaha) aim to create an older and younger brother and cousins (to the MT-09) - maybe the same capacity, but a slightly different concept". This was translated into the creation of the MT-07 (FZ-07 in North America), the XSR700, the XSR900 and the MT-10 (FZ-10 in North America). The MT-10 is using the same engine from R1, albeit detuned from the factory.

== Reception ==
In Motor Cycle News, Michael Neeves said, "The MT-09 starts an exciting new era for Yamaha" and "The MT-09 is a roadster for all occasions. It’s fun". However, the ride-by-wire throttle was criticised as "snatchy". Cycle World's Kevin Cameron describes the styling as "V-Max meets Transformers Robot", "like a Supermono" and "an up-to-the-minute streetfighter, no bland revival of a 1970s' UJM. Call it a new synthesis." Cycle World named the FZ-09 'Best Standard' of 2015.

In an MCN 5-bike group test in 2015, the testers felt that the MT-09 Tracer was a better bike and better value than its four competitors, namely: a Triumph Tiger 800XRx and a Tiger Sport, a Honda Crossrunner, and a Ducati Hyperstrada.

The US online magazine Cycle World stated "Handling, too, feels more refined and solid than ever." about the 2021 model year and added "The 2021 MT-09 is much more than an update, even if it’s just slightly less than an absolutely complete redesign".

== See also ==
- List of motorcycles by type of engine
