= Yamaha Tracer 900 =

Sport-touring motorcycle produced by Yamaha

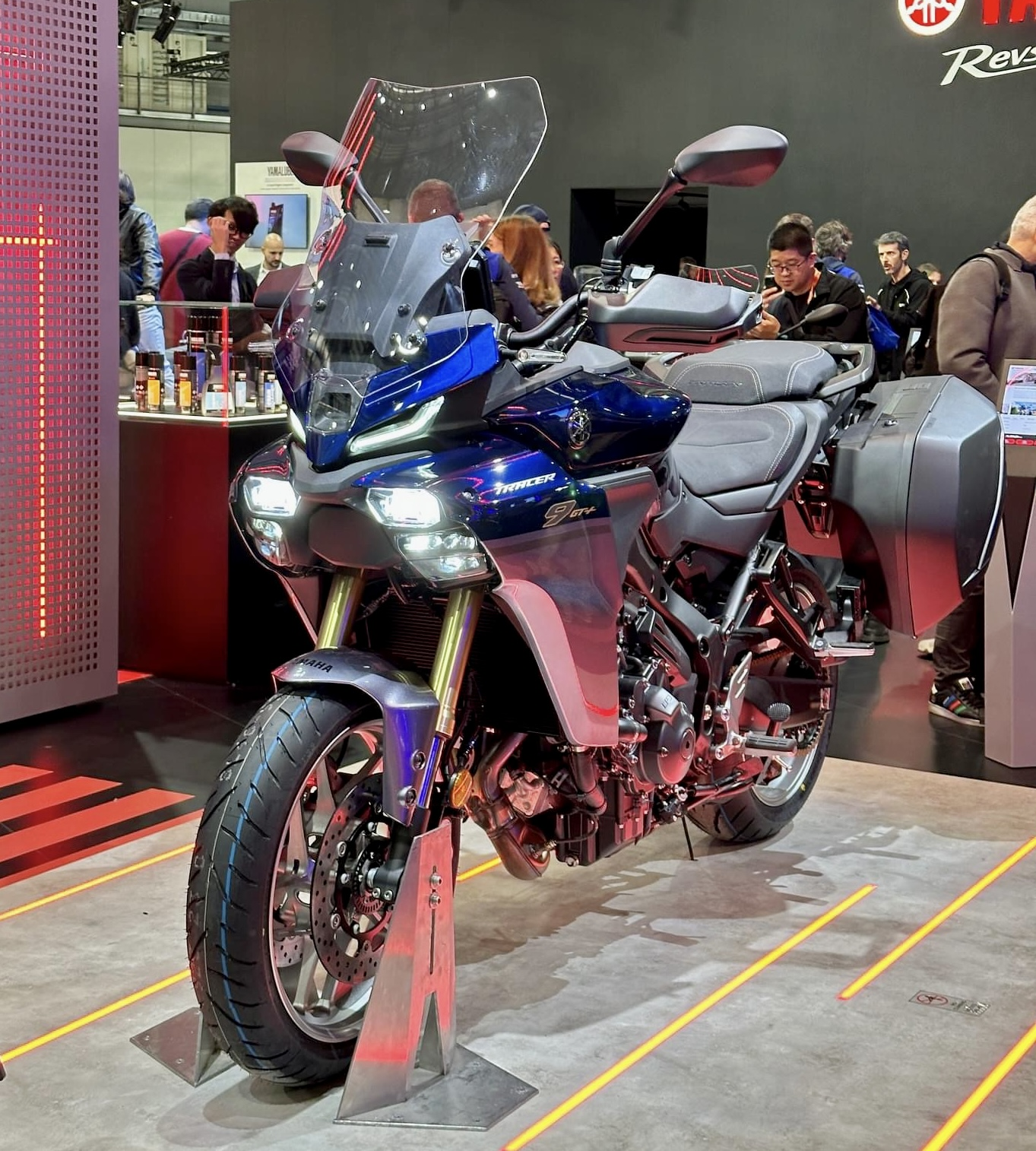
- Yamaha Tracer 9 GT
- Manufacturer: Yamaha Motor Company
- Also called: Yamaha FJ-09 (North America); Yamaha MT-09 Tracer (Japan, South America, Australia, New Zealand)
- Parent company: Yamaha Corporation
- Production: 2015–present
- Predecessor: Yamaha TDM 900
- Class: Sport touring
- Engine: 847.2–890.2 cc (51.70–54.32 cu in) liquid-cooled 4-stroke 12-valve DOHC inline-three
- Bore / stroke: 78 mm × 59.1 mm (3.1 in × 2.3 in) (2014–2020); 78 mm × 62.1 mm (3.1 in × 2.4 in) (2021–present)
- Compression ratio: 11.5:1
- Top speed: 140 mph (230 km/h)
- Power: 115 hp (86 kW) (claimed)@ 10,000 rpm
- Torque: 64.5 lb⋅ft (87.5 N⋅m) (claimed)@ 8,500 rpm
- Ignition type: TCI
- Transmission: 6-speed, multi-plate, wet clutch Chain final drive
- Frame type: Aluminium diamond
- Suspension: Front: 41 mm telescopic fork, adjustable preload and rebound damping, 137 mm (5.4 in) travel Rear: Swingarm (link type), adjustable preload and rebound damping, 130 mm (5.1 in) travel
- Brakes: Front: Dual 298 mm (11.7 in) hydraulic discs Rear: Single 245 mm (9.6 in) hydraulic disc
- Tires: Front: 120/70ZR17; Rear: 180/55ZR17
- Rake, trail: 24°, 100 mm (3.9 in)
- Wheelbase: 1,440 mm (56.7 in)
- Dimensions: L: 2,160 mm (85 in); W: 950 mm (37 in); H: 1,345 mm (53.0 in)
- Seat height: 845 mm (33.3 in) or 860 mm (34 in) (adjustable)
- Weight: 210 kg (462 lb) (wet)
- Fuel capacity: 18 L (4.0 imp gal; 4.8 US gal)
- Oil capacity: 3.4 L (3.6 US qt)
- Related: Yamaha Tracer 700

The Yamaha Tracer 900 (FJ-09 in North America; MT-09 Tracer in Japan, South America, Australia, and New Zealand) is a sport touring motorcycle first offered in 2015. The 3-cylinder crossplane engine comes from the MT-09 (FZ-09 in North America).

== Design and development ==
Yamaha announced the release of the MT-09 Tracer on November 4, 2014, as a variant based on the popular MT-09 sports model powered by an 850cc in-line three-cylinder engine. They released in the European market in early March 2015.

The MT-09 Tracer is based on the current MT-09 model that is popular for its ability to respond as the rider intends and powered by an in-line three-cylinder Crossplane Concept engine. The MT-09 TRACER was developed under the concept of a “Sporty Multi-use Bike” and is intended to provide sporty yet comfortable riding in a variety of situations, including urban riding and touring.

=== Relation with Yamaha TDM ===
After 20 years producing the TDM, Yamaha Motor Company stopped the production in 2011. In 2014 rumors and photos leaked on the internet showed a new design of sport touring motorcycle with many similarities between the TDM and this new machine. In 2015 Yamaha released the MT-09 Tracer (FJ-09 in North America) developed from the MT-09 technology. Even when nobody at Yamaha mentioned the TDM during this project, many professionals and fans believed it is the direct successor.

== Model name ==
The bike was launched as the "MT-09 Tracer" in most markets, and as the "FJ-09" in North America. From 2016, the bike was renamed to "Tracer 900" in Europe, the same year the Tracer 700 was introduced in Europe, based on the MT-07 (FZ-07 in North America). In Japan, South America, Australia, and New Zealand, it has continued with the original name of "MT-09 Tracer." Starting from the 2019 model year in the United States, it was renamed to Tracer 900. For 2021, a completely redesigned model was introduced, changing the name again, this time to "Tracer 9" (and "Tracer 9 GT" for the better equipped version).

== Models ==
=== First generation ===
==== 2015 to 2016 (MT-09 Tracer Worldwide and FJ-09 in US) ====
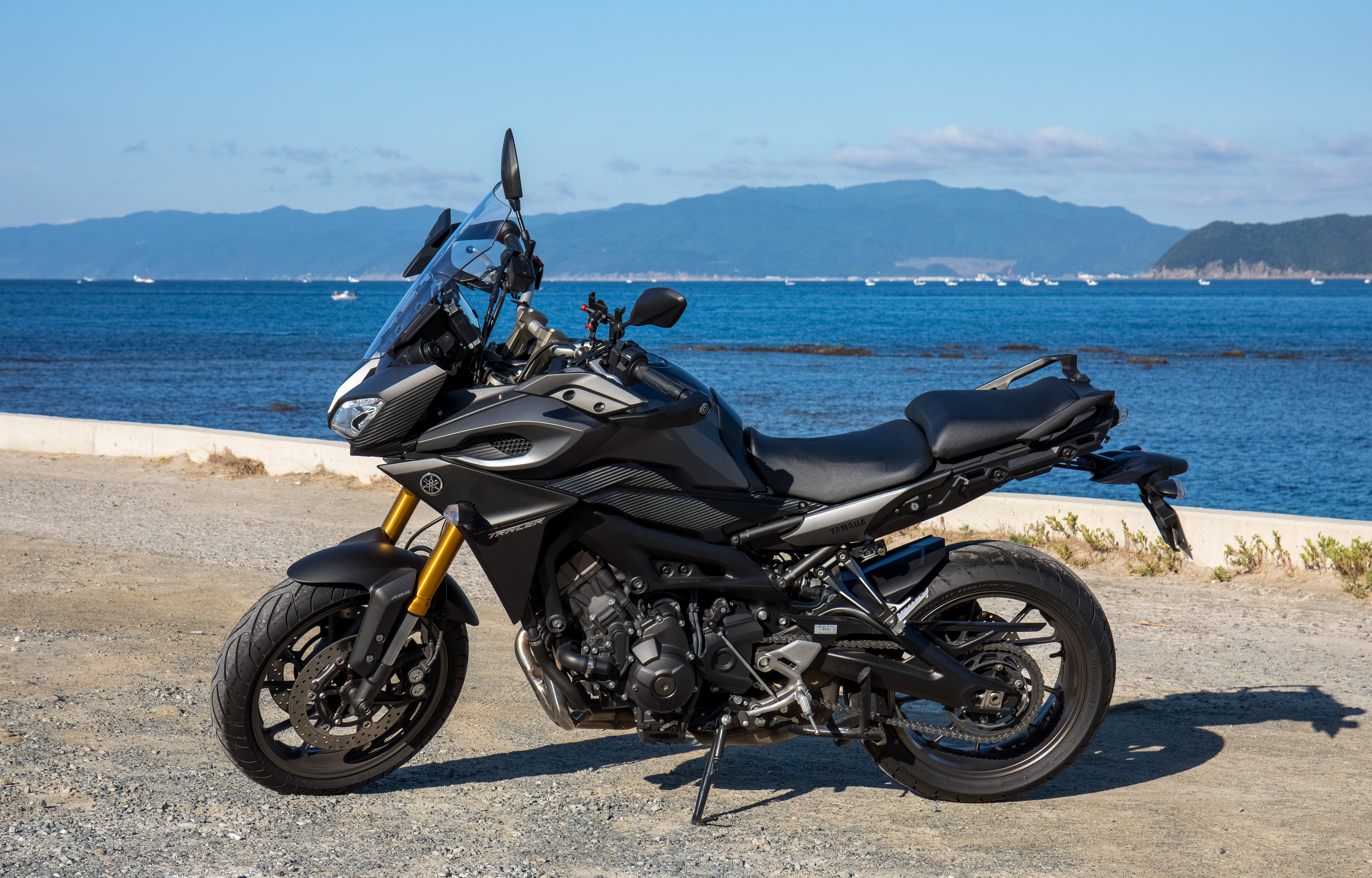
Yamaha MT-09 Tracer

The technology of the Tracer 900 comes directly from the MT-09, adding a partial fairing and windscreen, a bigger fuel tank, handguards, centerstand, a 12-volt power socket, on/off switchable traction control, revised fuel map, and three riding modes. It also gains a dash comes directly from the XT1200Z Super Ténéré. The Tracer 900 utilises LEDs for the headlights, tail lights, brake lights. The handlebars are significantly higher and wider and are closer to the rider due to the seat being further forward, making for a much more upright riding position. The rear subframe is bigger and more robust and incorporates factory supports for lateral cases. The rear arm suspension is longer than the MT-09. The suspension has stiffer springs and more damping and preload than the MT-09.

The FJ-09 variant is electronically limited in its performance to an indicated 191 km/h (119 mph).

==== 2017 ====
Starting in 2017, the model gained the three-mode adjustable traction control and new assist-and-slipper clutch unit found on the XSR900 and FZ-09/MT-09 siblings.

=== Second generation ===
==== 2018 to 2020 (Tracer 900 and Tracer 900 GT) ====
Starting in 2018, Yamaha offers an up-spec model called the "Tracer 900 GT," which includes the same engine, frame, and body design as the standard Tracer, but with factory saddlebags (now color-matched) as standard, cruise control, heated grips, longer rear swingarm, an updated full-color TFT dash based on the unit from the Yamaha R1 and a new windscreen design that can be adjusted with one hand while riding instead of the older two knob system designed to be adjusted from a stop.

=== Third generation ===
==== 2021 (Tracer 9 and Tracer 9 GT) ====
In 2021, Yamaha introduced a completely redesigned bike. The engine has increased in capacity and horsepower, and a new exhaust system helps meet Euro 5 emissions regulations. The frame is also completely new and so are the wheels. The swingarm is also new, and longer than the unit in the MT-09. The fairings, lighting system (based on the R1's), TFT dashboard (2 units, side by side), hand guards, seats and tank are also new, with increased fuel capacity (from 18 to 19 liters). Both versions now include cruise control and center stand as standard. The "GT" version also includes new side cases capable of holding full face helmets, six-axis IMU with cornering ABS and lean sensitive TCS, cornering lights, heated grips and semi-active electronic suspension from KYB. Notably, the new model is lighter than the previous by 2 kg.

==== 2024 (Tracer 9 GT+) ====
In 2024, Yamaha added Adaptive Cruise Control (ACC) and Radar-Linked Unified Braking System enabled by the large radar at the front on this model. A new 7-inch TFT display, new switchgear, a larger rear disc (for the new braking system), a new seat design, and a third-generation quick-shifter were also added to the model.
