= Yamaha Tracer 700 =

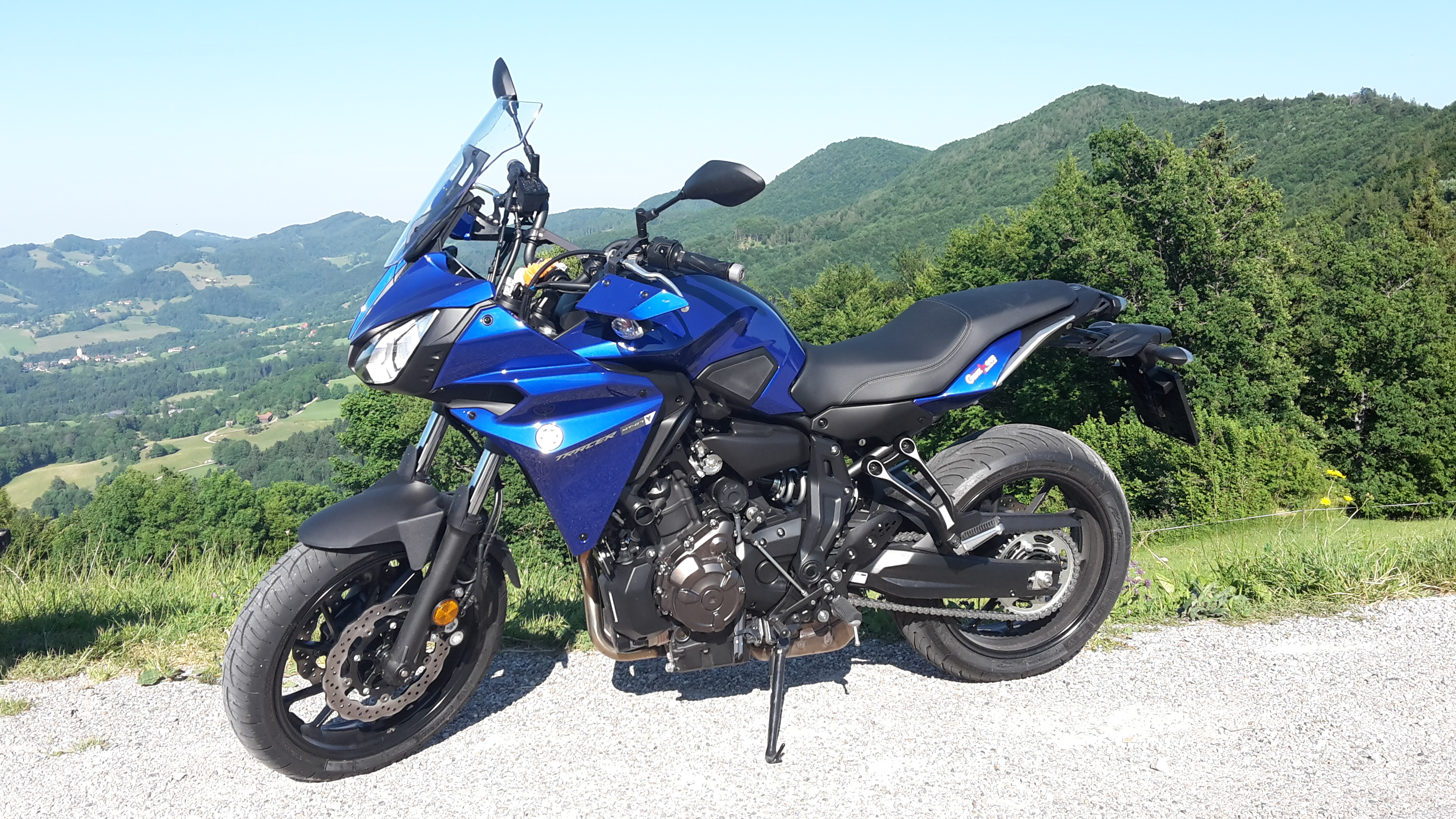
- 2020 Yamaha Tracer 700
- Manufacturer: Yamaha Motor Company
- Parent company: Yamaha Corporation
- Production: 2016–present
- Assembly: St-Quentin, France
- Predecessor: Yamaha FZ6
- Class: Sport touring; Standard
- Engine: 689 cc (42.0 cu in) liquid-cooled 4-stroke 8-valve DOHC parallel-twin with crossplane crankshaft
- Bore / stroke: 80.0 mm × 68.6 mm (3.1 in × 2.7 in)
- Compression ratio: 11.5:1
- Power: 55 kW (73.8 hp; 74.8 PS) @ 9,000 rpm; 35 kW (46.9 hp; 47.6 PS) @ 7,500 rpm limited version; 49.85 kW (66.8 hp; 67.8 PS) @ 9,200 rpm (rear wheel)
- Torque: 68 N⋅m (50 lbf⋅ft) @ 6,500 rpm; 61.6 N⋅m (45.4 lbf⋅ft) @ 6,600 rpm (rear wheel)
- Transmission: 6-speed constant mesh
- Frame type: Tubular backbone
- Suspension: Front: Telescopic fork; Rear: Swingarm (link type)
- Rake, trail: 24°, 90 mm (3.5 in)
- Wheelbase: 1,460 mm (57.5 in)
- Dimensions: L: 2,140 mm (84.3 in); W: 806 mm (31.7 in)
- Seat height: 840 mm (33.1 in)
- Weight: 196 kg (432 lb) (wet)
- Fuel capacity: 17 L (3.7 imp gal; 4.5 US gal)
- Oil capacity: 3 L (0.7 imp gal; 0.8 US gal)
- Fuel consumption: 27.02 km/L (76.3 mpg_{‑imp}; 63.6 mpg_{‑US}) (claimed)
- Related: Yamaha MT-07; Yamaha Tracer 900; Yamaha Ténéré 700

The Yamaha Tracer 700 is a sport touring motorcycle first offered in 2016. The parallel-twin cylinder with crossplane crankshaft engine comes from the MT-07 and it is also used on the Yamaha YZF-R7.

== 2020 model ==
In 2020, the Tracer 700 was updated with new fairing and LED headlights. The engine was also tweaked to meet Euro-5 emission limits.

== Tracer 700 GT model ==
In 2019 Yamaha briefly announced a GT version of the Tracer 700, similar to the larger Yamaha Tracer 900 one. It included side cases and a few other touring features, but the market availability of this variant is unknown as it was removed from the Yamaha official sites in all the countries, the only references are motorcycle magazine reviews and some Yamaha dealers in Europe.
