= Flat-plane crank =

Crankshaft with throws extending in one plane only

The flat-plane crank (sometimes flatplane) is a type of crankshaft for use in internal combustion engines that has a 180-degree angle between crank throws.

== Details ==
Flat-plane cranks are used in V-configuration engines, generally with eight cylinders. Cadillac introduced a V8 cross-plane crank engine in 1923.

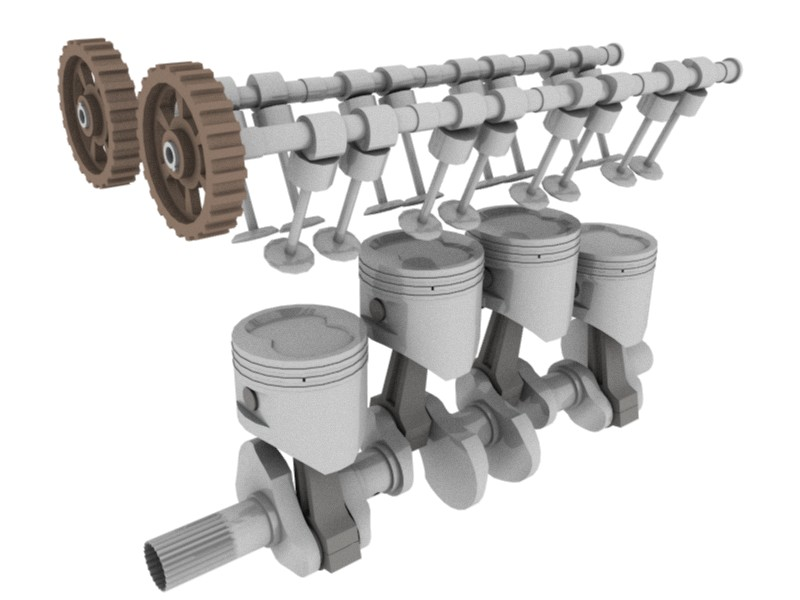
Computer generated image showing the major internal moving parts of a DOHC inline-four engine, including the flat-plane crankshaft

Inline-four cylinder engines almost all use flat-plane cranks, and thus are not usually identified as such. However, there are a few exceptions with crossplane cranks.

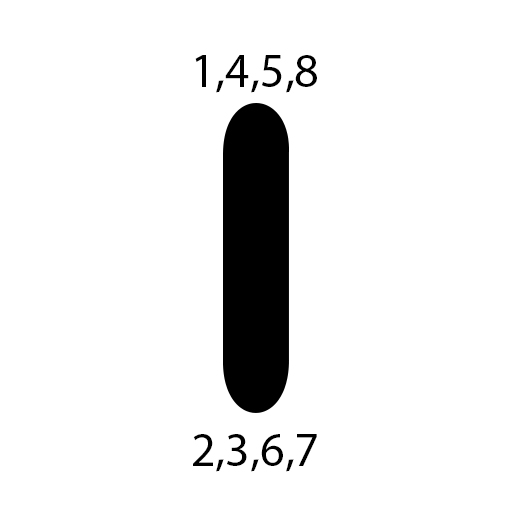
Front view of a V8 flat plane crankshaft with corresponding connecting rod positions

The flat-plane crankshaft was used in the World War II Sherman Tank in the Ford GAA engine, an all-aluminium 32-valve DOHC 60-degree liquid-cooled V8. However, the flat-plane design is no longer widely used in most mass production V engines as it is more prone to vibration and is inherently much louder than a crossplane crankshaft. However, due to its simpler construction requiring less counterweight, it is inherently lighter with a higher rev limit. For this reason, it remains useful in sports and racing cars. Flat-plane crankshafts are generally associated with European sports cars such as Ferrari and McLaren V8 engines, and cross-plane cranks with American manufacturers. There are some exceptions such as the Ferrari-designed crossplane crank V8 of the Lancia Thema 8.32 and the flat-plane crank 2014–2023 Ford Mustang GT350. The 2023 model year Chevrolet Corvette Z06 has the largest flat-plane V8 ever seen in production cars at 5.5 litres.

The way in which a flat-plane works within a V8 engine is more like two in-line 4-cylinder engines mated together, with the firing order of each order being in a Right-Left-Right-Left-Right-Left-Right-Left pattern. Being in this in-line configuration allows for the engine to rev much faster, making it more suitable for racing engines.

== See also ==
- Crossplane
