= Yamaha YZF-R Series =

Series of sport bikes

The Yamaha YZF-R Series (also known as R Series) is a series of sport bikes made by Yamaha Motor Company since 1998.

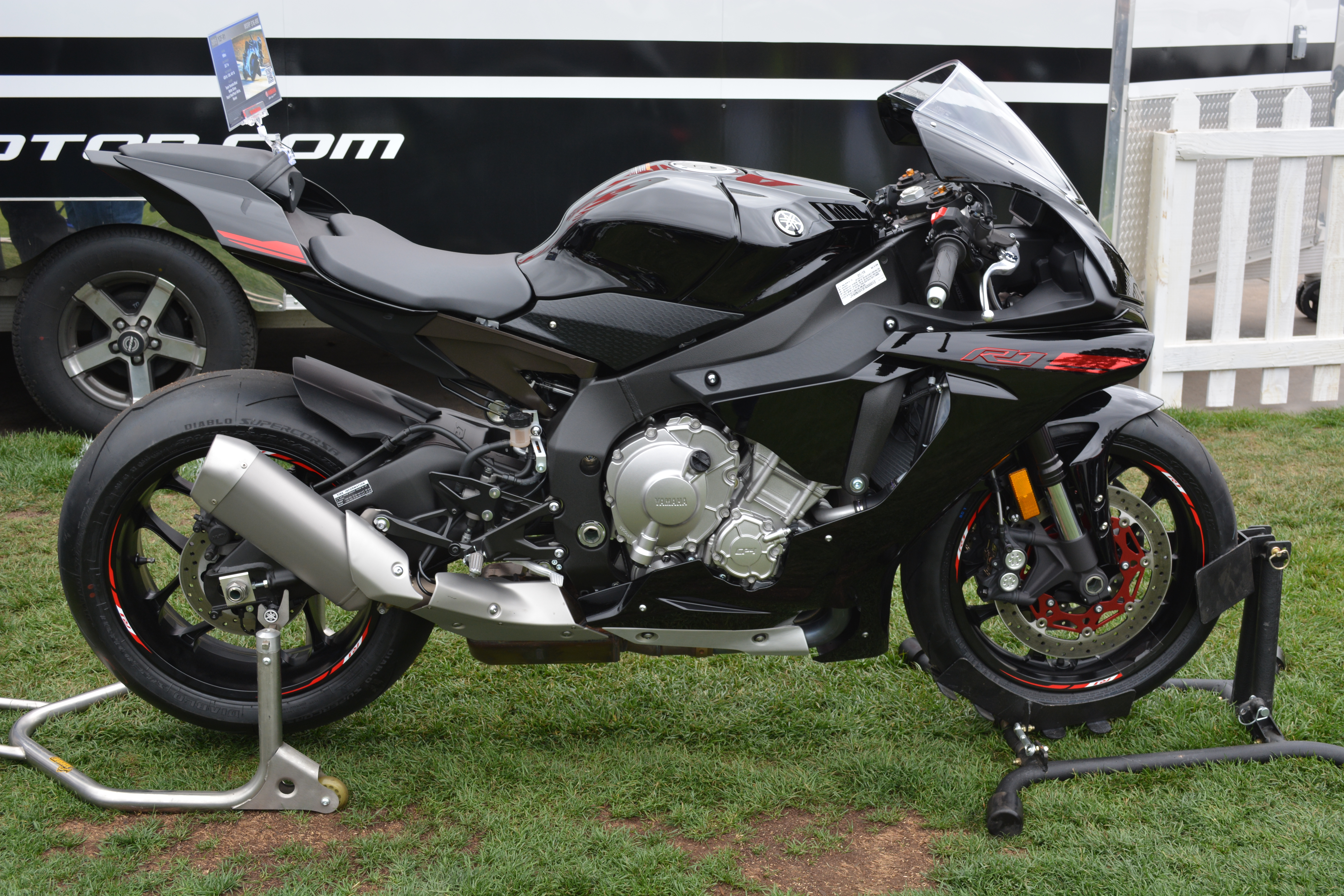
2015 Yamaha R1

== Single-cylinder ==
- YZF-R125 (2008–present)
- YZF-R15 (2008–present)
- YZF-R2 (2026–present)

== Parallel-twin ==
- YZF-R25 (2014–present)
- YZF-R3 (2015–present)
- YZF-R7 (2022–present)

== Inline-three ==
- YZF-R9 (2025–present)

== Inline-four ==
- YZF-R1 (1998–present)
- YZF-R6 (1999–2020)
- YZF-R7 (1999)
