= Yamaha XS 650 =

Yamaha motorcycle

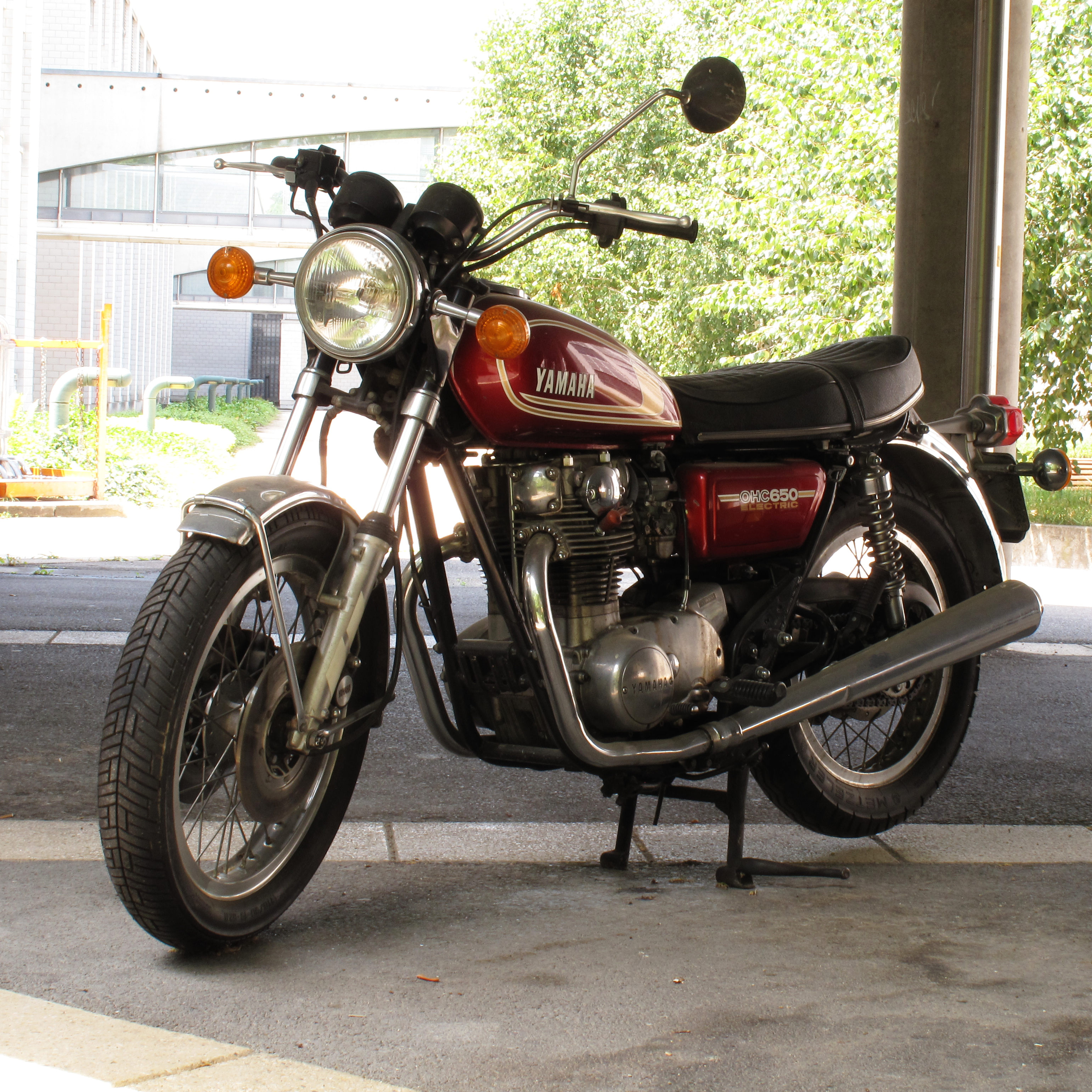
- Yamaha XS650
- Manufacturer: Yamaha Motor Company
- Also called: XS-1, XS-2, TX 650
- Parent company: Yamaha Corporation
- Production: 1969 (1970 model)–1985 1970–1983 (U.S)
- Successor: Yamaha XSR700
- Class: Standard
- Engine: 654 cc (39.9 cu in), 4-stroke, parallel twin, air-cooled, SOHC, 2 valves per cylinder
- Bore / stroke: 75 mm × 74 mm (3.0 in × 2.9 in)
- Compression ratio: 8.4:1
- Top speed: 169 km/h (105 mph)
- Power: 40 kW (53 bhp) @ 7000 rpm (claimed)
- Ignition type: Contact point-pre 1980 TCI-post 1980
- Transmission: 5-Speed, manual
- Frame type: tubular steel
- Suspension: Front: telescopic Rear: swinging fork
- Brakes: Front: Single disc (earlier models); twin disc (later models); Rear: drum
- Tires: Front: 3.50 × 19 inch Rear 4.00 × 18 inch
- Weight: 185 kg (408 lb) (dry); 194 kg (428 lb) (wet)
- Fuel capacity: 3 US gal (11 L; 2 imp gal) or 4 US gal (15 L; 3 imp gal)

The Yamaha XS650 is a mid-size motorcycle that was made by the Yamaha Motor Company. The standard model was introduced in October 1969, and produced until 1979. The "Special" cruiser model was introduced in 1978 and produced until 1985. The XS650 began with the 1955 Hosk SOHC 500 twin. After about 10 years of producing 500 twin, Hosk engineers designed a 650 cc twin. Later Showa Corporation acquired the Hosk company, and in 1960 Yamaha acquired Showa, with Hosk's early design of 650 cc twin.

When the Yamaha XS 650 was launched in October 1969 it had one of the most advanced reciprocating engines in its class of large parallel twin motorcycles. The engine and gearbox are unit construction with the crankcase split horizontally for ease of assembly, whereas almost all contemporaries in its class in 1969 are either unit construction with a vertically split crankcase or pre-unit construction with separate engine and gearbox. The XS650's engine was used in AMA Professional Dirt Track Racing by national champion Kenny Roberts. In 1969 only the Laverda 750S, and the Honda CB350, also launched that year, matched the XS 650's modernity of unit construction and SOHC valve operation.

== Model history ==
The 1970 model was designated the XS-1. Subsequent Yamaha XS650 models were XS-1B (1971), XS-2 (1972), then TX650/XS2B (1973), TX650-A (1974), XS650B (1975), XS650C (1976), XS-D (1977), XS-E (1978), XS-F (1979). 1979 was the last year of the so-called "Standards" (an unofficial term commonly used to differentiate it from the "Special," which has pullback bars, a teardrop tank, and other differences in appearance). The Es and Fs also came in Special form: XS-SE (S for Special) and XS-SF. From then on they were Specials only to XS-SG, XS-SH, XS-SJ, XS-SK. There was a Special II (Two) model designation in 1978 (unknown) in 1979 (XS-SF-II), 1980 (XS-G), 1981 (XS-H) which were models with fewer chrome parts decals instead of plated plastic on the side covers as well as drum rear brake and wire wheels versus disc rear brake or cast wheels. The Special II was offered until 1985, the last year for the XS 650.

The first two model years (XS-1 and XS-1B) were kick start only, with an electric starter added from the 1972 model year on. This had a compression release added to the front left exhaust tappet cover resulting in a square versus triangular cover found on the other exhaust and intake covers. Upon removal of the compression release mechanism in 1974 due to updated starter, the square cover at the left exhaust valve was continued.

Brake modification notes:

- Drum fronts on early models cannot be changed.
- Pre '77 & post '77 fronts have different (offset) brake discs, the wheels swap but not the discs.
- Drum rear wheel into rear disc frame needs the rear drum frame swingarm too.
- Disk rear wheel into rear drum frame needs the rear disc frame swingarm and also needs brake master-cylinder lugs welded to the frame.

Handling differences on swapping rear wheels:-

- Standard rear tire is 110/90-18. Special rear tire is 130/90-16. Because the Standard tire is narrower it will tend to steer a bit more quickly. Because the Special tire is wider it will tend to be a bit steadier in a straight line. Overall gearing is not changed from the Standard, as the two tires are essentially the same outside diameter.

Prior to the XS-B model, the bike had a reputation for speed wobbles but adjustments to the 1975 setup overcame these.

1976 models had the front brake caliper moved to the right fork leg, behind the fork as opposed to in front of the fork. This placed the brake caliper nearer the steering pivot center-line, requiring slightly less effort to steer.

Mid-'77 the front forks had a major redesign: fork tube diameter increased from 34 to 35 mm (1.4 in) and internals were changed (although this also holds true for various years of the same tube size). The entire fork assembly (with triple tree) will swap either way but fork parts are not equivalent. Also the brake caliper changed from a 48 mm (1.9 in) dual piston cast iron design for the 34 mm (1.3 in) fork to a 40 mm (1.6 in) aluminum single piston floating caliper for the 35 mm (1.4 in) forks. The brake caliper mounting lugs on the fork sliders are of different spacing for the 34 mm (1.3 in) and 35 mm (1.4 in) forks so the calipers can't be swapped.

=== End of production ===
The XS 650 was produced until 1985. The last model year was 1983 in the United States, with Canada, Europe and other markets continuing into 1984 and 1985. However, many US models remained unsold for some years due to overproduction and an economic recession and brand new 1982 and 1983 models could still be purchased in 1987 at some dealerships.

== Design ==
=== Engine ===
Like the contemporaries in its class the XS 650 has a 360° crank angle. This provides an even firing interval between the two cylinders, but also generates some vibration caused by the two pistons rising and falling together. This vibration is particularly noticeable at idle. Because of a long-acknowledged vibration issue, starting with the 1974 models, vibration damping modifications were made to the engine and handlebar mountings.

A single overhead camshaft (SOHC) operates the XS 650's valves, whereas almost all contemporaries in its class have pushrod valvegear.

The 360 degrees crankshaft uses three roller bearings and a ball bearing. The camshaft uses four ball bearings, and rolling bearings are used throughout the rest of the engine. Connecting rods turn on needle bearings. Since the engine is SOHC, there are no pushrods to operate the valves. The camshaft gets its drive from a single-row chain running from the center of the crankshaft. Chain tension is maintained by a spring-loaded guide, which also takes up unnecessary slack. The initial intake valve timing was changed in 1973 (EPA mandated) from a longer duration to a milder duration, this and other changes stifled the later models somewhat, the compression ratio also became lower over the years to match the milder cam timing, the flywheel is lighter than British contemporaries, this has the effect that the engine tends to pick up revs more rapidly when the throttle is opened quickly.

During the later developments of the engine compression ratios were lowered, then raised. Pistons were lightened 20 percent along with connecting rods to reduce the reciprocating mass inside the engine. Aluminum pistons are slightly domed with valve pockets. Pistons have three rings installed, two compression and one oil control ring.

Horizontal split of the crankcases offers the advantages of oil tightness through the elimination of vertical joints and one-step access to both the lower end and the gearbox. Oil pressure is provided by the trochoidal pump, driven by a steel spur gear off the crankshaft. The main bearings, transmission main shaft, clutch bushing, shifter fork guide bar, and rocker arms are lubricated by pressurized oil, whereas the rest of the engine is lubricated by “oil splash, this includes the big ends .”

=== Carburetion ===
Pre-1980 models use the twin 38 mm (1.5 in) constant velocity Mikuni carburetors that can be tuned by moving the needle clip position, or by replacing jets. In the carburetors the velocity of the fuel mixture through the venturi, regulated by the opening of the butterfly valves and engine speed, causes a pressure difference between the top and the bottom of the carburetor pistons. This pressure difference raises and lowers the carburetor slides, increasing or decreasing engine output accordingly.

Post-1979 models use smaller 34 mm (1.3 in) Mikuni CV carbs with needles that seem to be listed in parts menus as being 'fixed' position,(in other words a needle that may only have one clip position). The pilot and main jets can be changed for different sizes. If the 34 mm (1.3 in) CV carb needles only have one fixed clip position.

=== Ignition ===
The models up to 1979 use points ignition. Two sets of points are located on the upper left of the cylinder head. On the right side cylinder head, an advance mechanism is located. An advance mechanism is used to retard the timing for easy starting and smooth idle. Post-1979 models use electronic ignition systems.

=== Performance ===
Cycle World tested the XS650 in March 1979. It ran the standing-start quarter mile 13.86 seconds with a terminal speed of 96.05 mph (154.58 km/h). The motorcycle's average fuel economy was 51.4 miles per US gallon (4.58 L/100 km; 61.7 mpg_{‑imp})

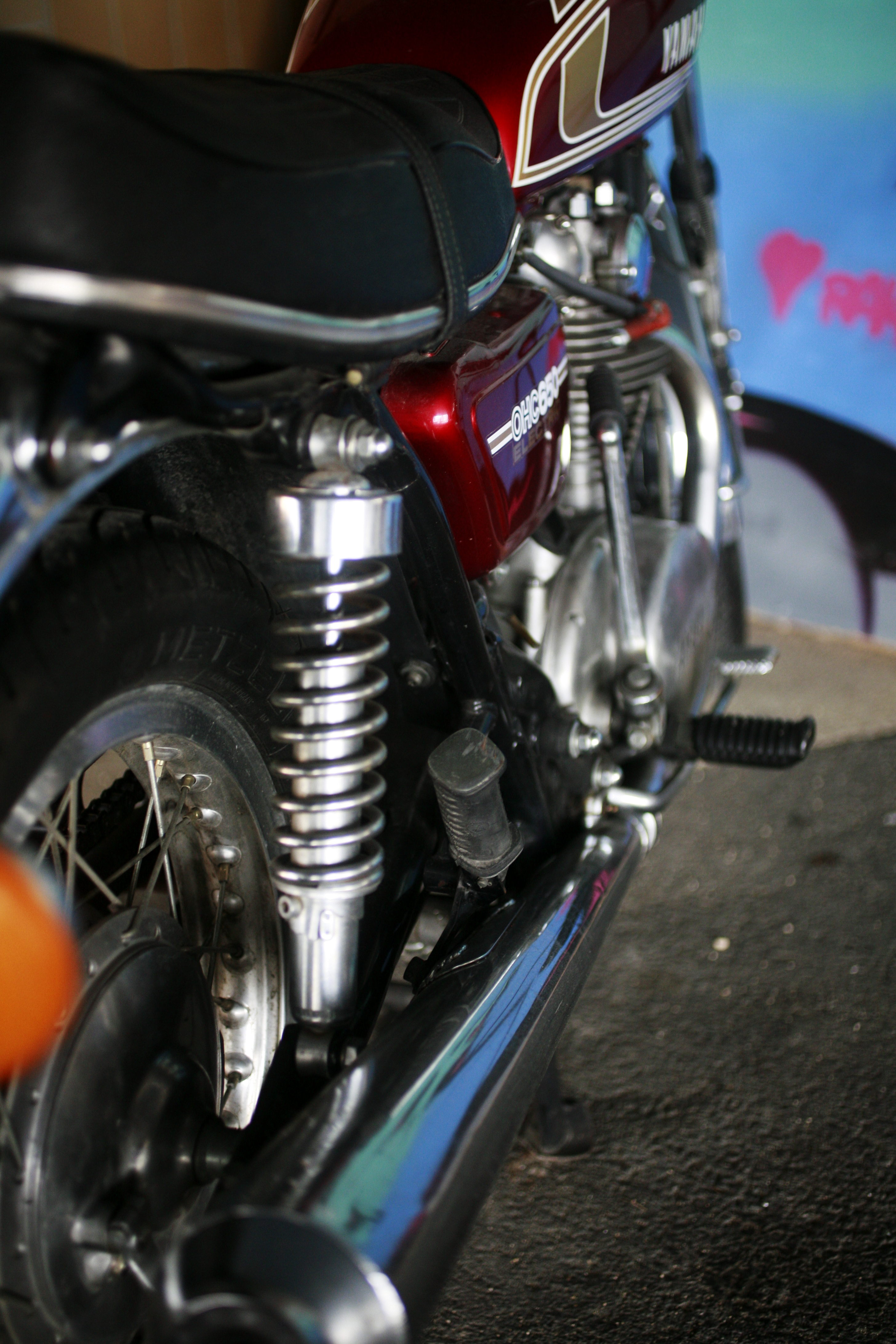
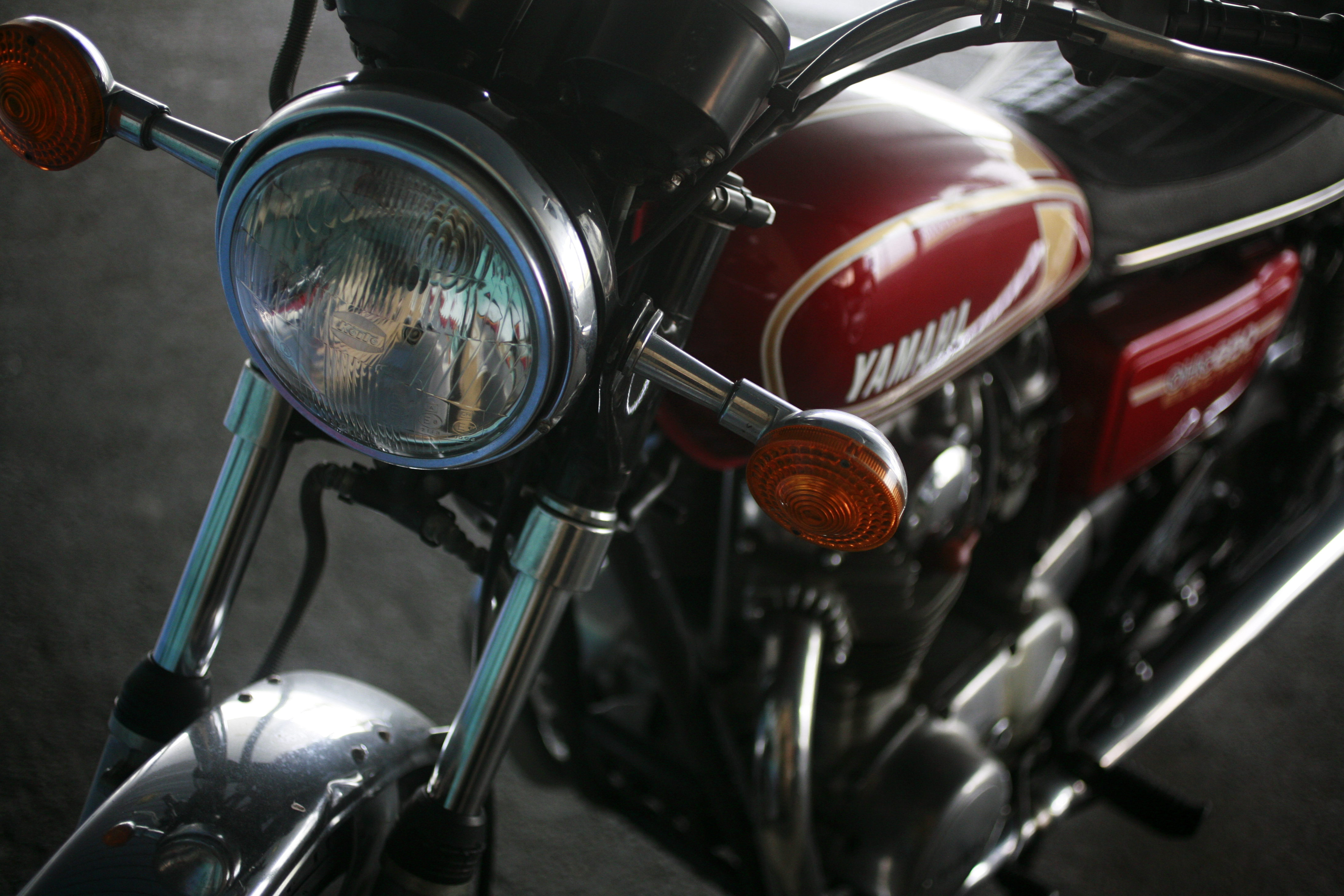

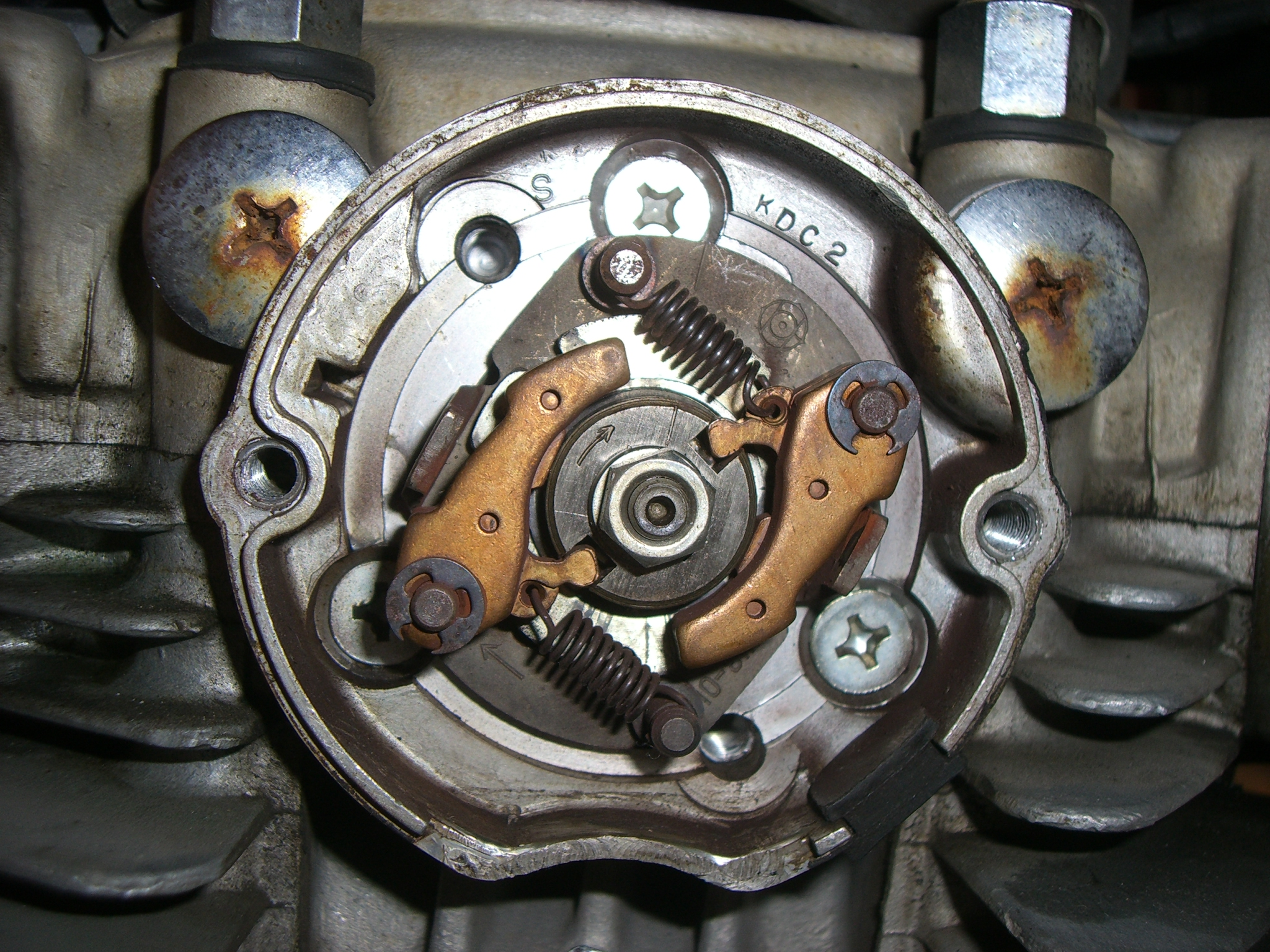
1979 Yamaha XS650 Advance Mechanism

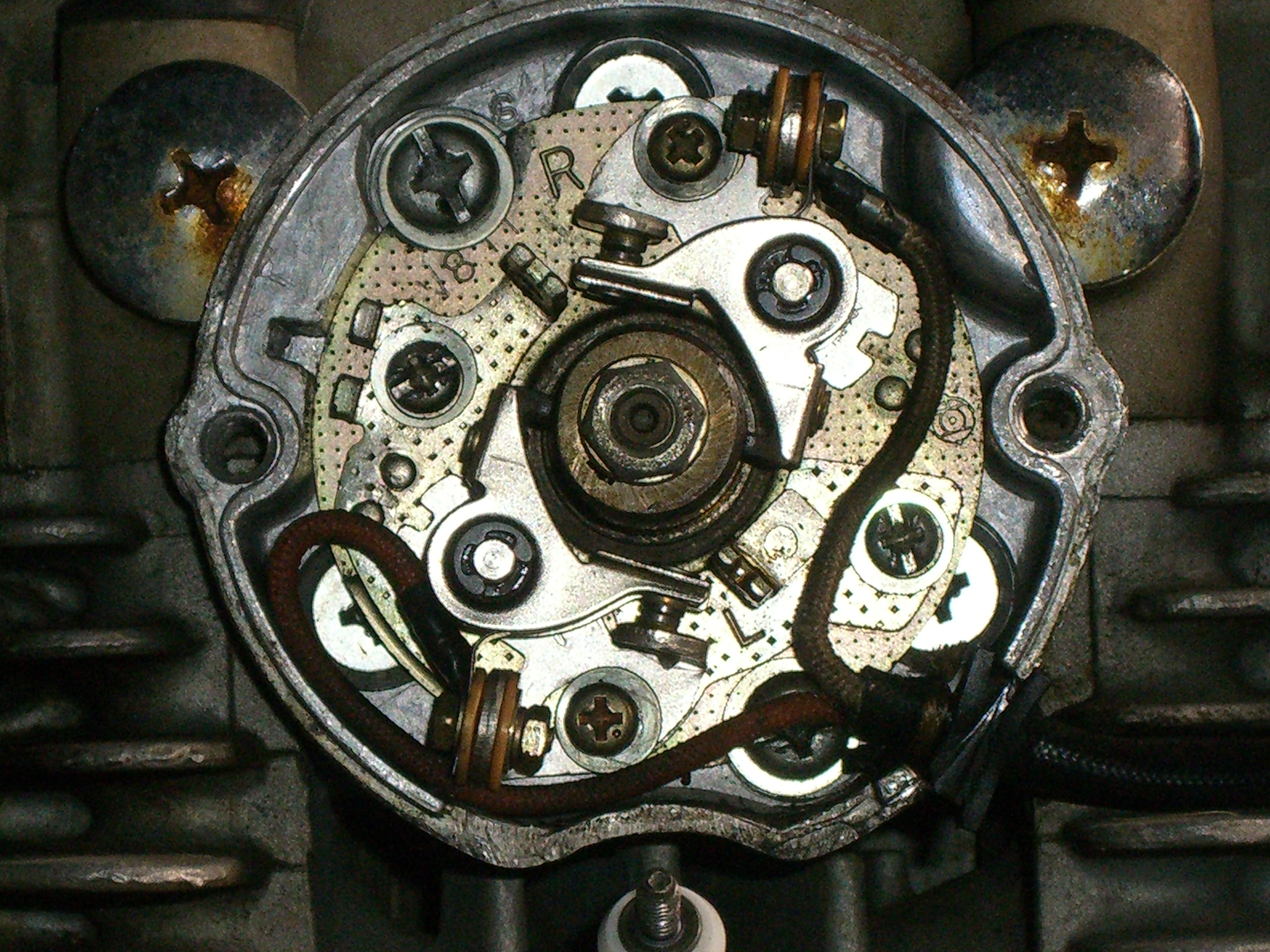
1979 Yamaha XS650 Point Ignition

== See also ==
- Yamaha XS750 Triple Special
- Kawasaki Z750 twin
- Honda CB650
