= Yamaha MT-07 =

Japanese motorcycle made beginning 2014

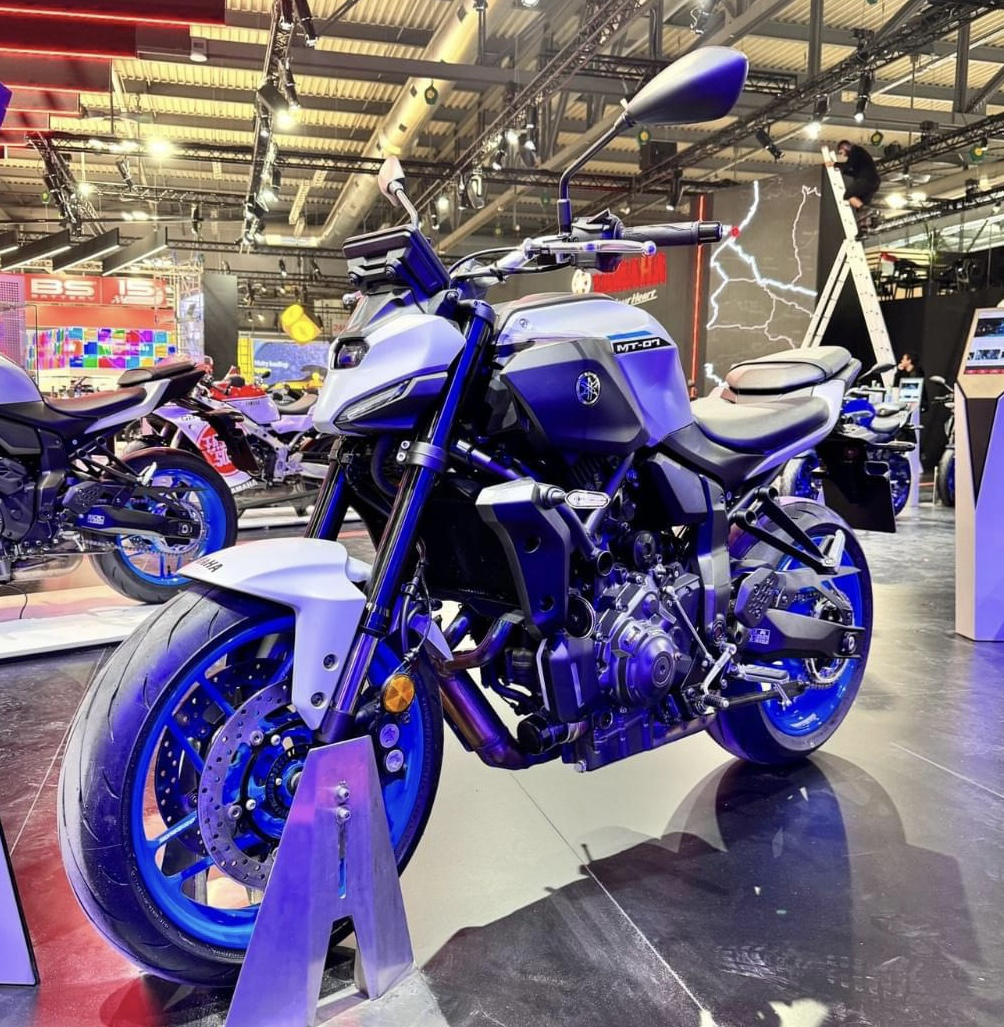
- 2025 Yamaha MT-07
- Manufacturer: Yamaha Motor Company
- Also called: Yamaha FZ-07 (North America; 2015–2017)
- Parent company: Yamaha Corporation
- Production: 2014–present
- Assembly: Japan; Indonesia: East Jakarta (2023–present)
- Predecessor: Yamaha FZ6
- Class: Naked bike; standard
- Engine: 689.6–655.6 cc (42.08–40.01 cu in) liquid-cooled 4-stroke 8-valve DOHC 270° parallel-twin with crossplane crankshaft
- Bore / stroke: 80 mm / 78 mm × 68.6 mm (3.1 in / 3.1 in × 2.7 in)
- Compression ratio: 11.5:1 (11.0:1 for the LAMS version)
- Top speed: 229 km/h (142 mph)
- Power: 55 kW (73.8 hp; 74.8 PS) @ 9,000 rpm; 49.85 kW (66.8 hp; 67.8 PS) @ 9,200 rpm (rear wheel); 655cc: 38.8 kW (52.0 hp; 52.8 PS) @ 8,000 rpm
- Torque: 68 N⋅m (50 lbf⋅ft) @ 6,500 rpm; 61.6 N⋅m (45.4 lbf⋅ft) @ 6,600 rpm (rear wheel); 655cc: 57 N⋅m (42 lbf⋅ft) @ 4,000 rpm
- Transmission: 6-speed constant mesh
- Frame type: Tubular backbone
- Suspension: Front: Telescopic fork; Rear: Swingarm (link type)
- Rake, trail: 24°, 90 mm (3.5 in)
- Wheelbase: 1,400 mm (55.1 in)
- Dimensions: L: 2,085 mm (82.1 in); W: 745 mm (29.3 in)
- Seat height: 805 mm (31.7 in)
- Weight: 179–181 kg (395–399 lb) (wet)
- Fuel capacity: 14 L (3.1 imp gal; 3.7 US gal)
- Oil capacity: 3 L (0.7 imp gal; 0.8 US gal)
- Fuel consumption: 24.2 km/L (68 mpg_{‑imp}; 57 mpg_{‑US}) (claimed); 4.51 L/100 km; 62.7 mpg_{‑imp} (52.2 mpg_{‑US})
- Related: Yamaha MT-09/FZ-09; Yamaha MT-10/FZ-10; Yamaha Tracer 700; Yamaha XSR700; Yamaha YZF-R7

The Yamaha MT-07 (called FZ-07 in North America until 2017) is an MT series standard motorcycle or UJM with a 689 cc (42.0 cu in) liquid-cooled 4 stroke and 8 valve DOHC parallel-twin cylinder with crossplane crankshaft, manufactured by Yamaha Motor Company from 2014 and US release in 2015. As of 2018, the bike is designated MT-07 in all markets.

In some markets such as South Africa, Australia and New Zealand, the bike is available in 655 cc (40.0 cu in) Learner Approved Motorcycle Scheme (LAMS) version for riders on Learner and Restricted licences.

== Design and development ==
In most respects, the MT-07 is a conventional middleweight naked bike. It uses a compact tubular backbone frame. Its rear monoshock unit is placed horizontally within the subframe to give a shorter wheelbase, to save weight and to lower the centre of gravity. The front forks are conventional telescopic items, whereas its 3-cylinder sibling, the MT-09, has inverted forks. The anti-lock braking system is available as an option on 2015–2017 models, but became standard equipment in 2018.

The base MT-07, featuring its modernized CP2 engine, served as a platform for several subsequent models, including the Yamaha Tracer 700 and Yamaha Ténéré 700. Yamaha commissioned designer Shinya Kimura to create a café racer special based on the MT-07. In June 2015, Kimura revealed the machine, which he called "Faster Son". Motorcycle News said that they expected Yamaha to announce a production version based on "Faster Son" in late 2015. The Yamaha XSR700 was launched for the 2016 model year based on the MT-07. The Yamaha Ténéré 700, which shares the CP2 engine with the MT-07, was launched for the 2019 model year.

== Reception ==
The MT-07 received positive reviews from motorcycling journalists. In The Daily Telegraph, Roland Brown rated the bike at five out of five stars, praising the engine, handling, value for money and overall riding experience, while criticising the front brake, calling it "adequate but less powerful than is suggested by its superbike-style specification of twin discs and four-piston Monobloc calipers". Motorcycle News awarded five stars also, praising the light weight and engine response, although noting that "at high speed it will start to get breathless".

Motorcycle Consumer News declared the engine response "remarkable for its smoothness"; and their dynamometer tests showed rear wheel horsepower of 66.85 hp (49.85 kW) @ 9,200 rpm, and torque at 45.41 ft⋅lb (61.57 N⋅m) @ 6,600 rpm. They measured a top speed of 238.01 km/h (147.89 mph), 0 to 1/4 mi (0.00 to 0.40 km) time of 12.13 seconds at 173.33 km/h (107.70 mph), 0 to 60 mph (0 to 97 km/h) time of 3.80 seconds and 0 to 100 mph (0 to 161 km/h) time of 10.51 seconds; but braking performance was "disappointing" at 60 to 0 mph (97 to 0 km/h) in 39.9 m (130.8 ft) with ABS activated. Motorcycle Consumer News suspected the poor braking was down to the Michelin Pilot Road 3 tyres; and they recommended buyers to wait until Bridgestone BT023 tyres were OE items.

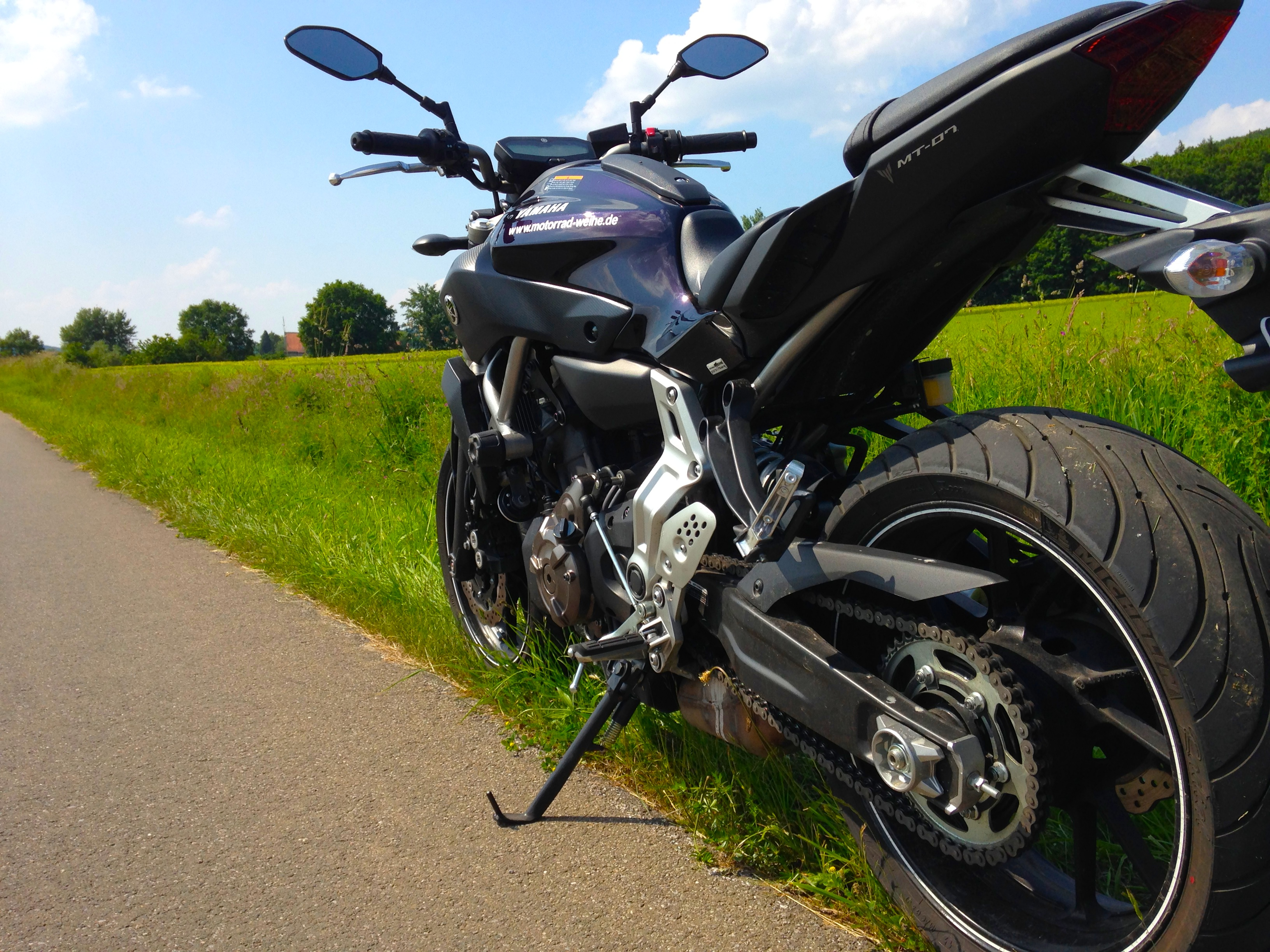
Rear view of the MT-07

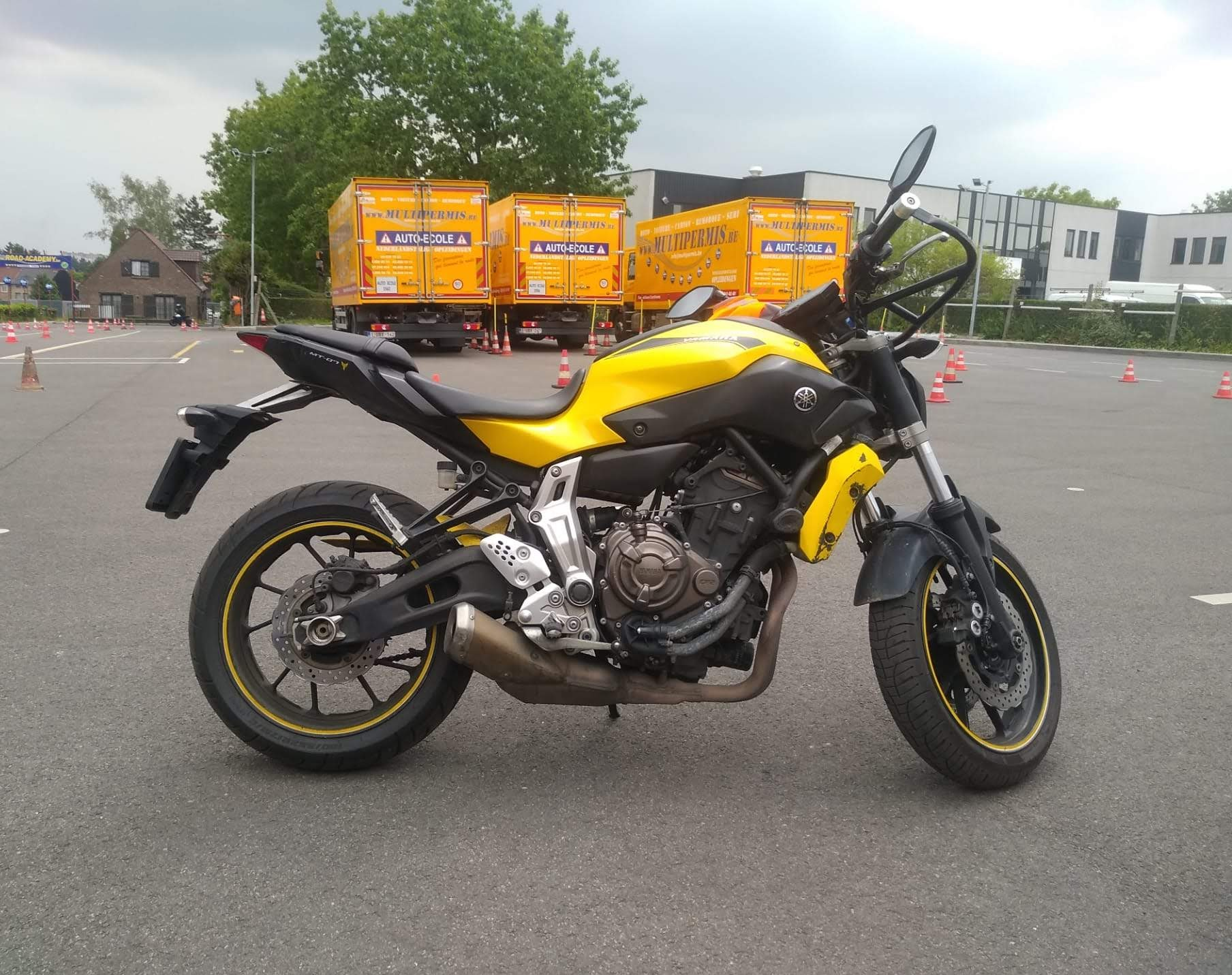
Side view of the Yamaha MT-07
