= Yamaha XSR700 =

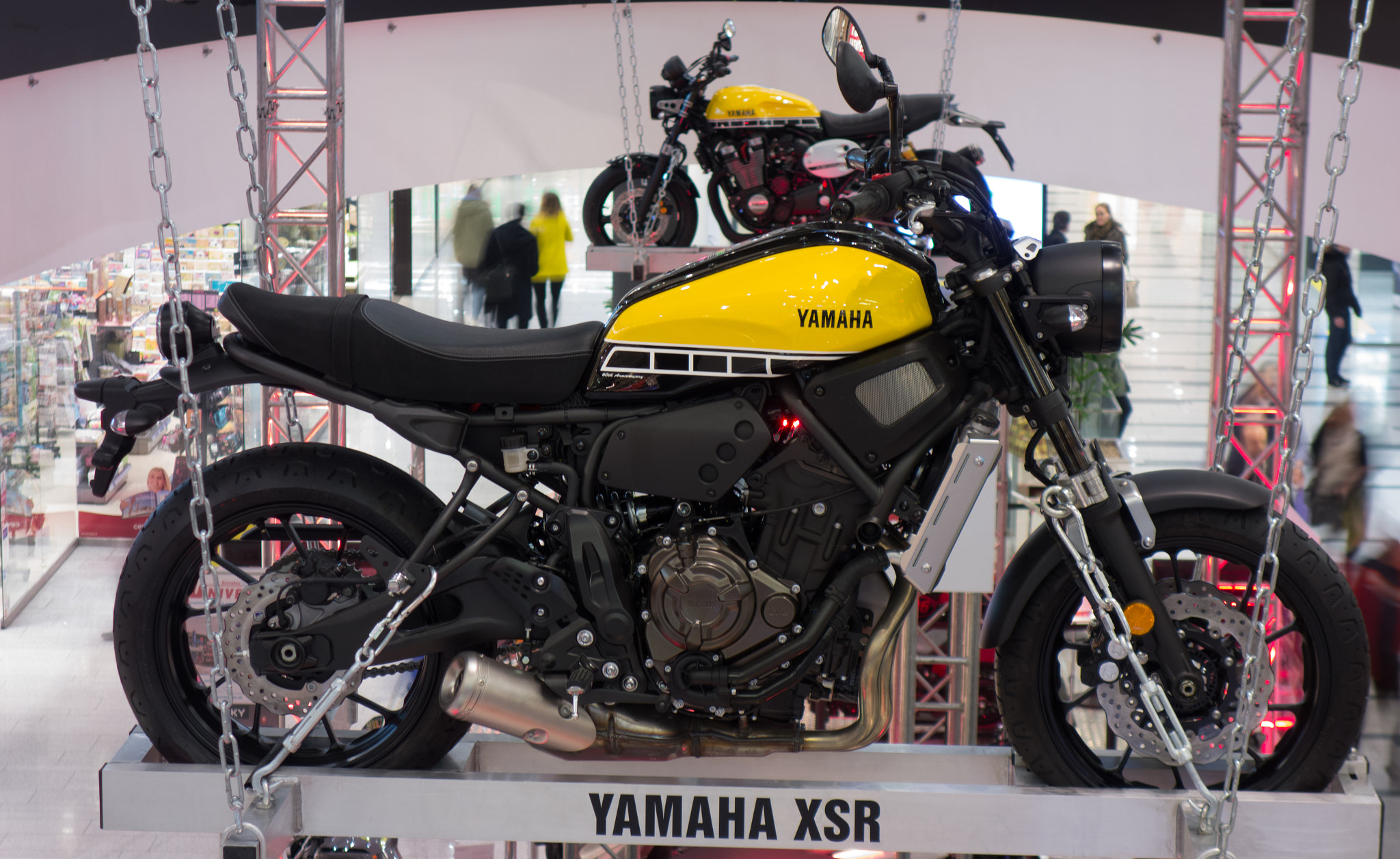
- Yamaha XSR 700 "60th Anniversary" limited color design
- Manufacturer: MBK Industrie, Rouvroy, France
- Parent company: Yamaha
- Production: 2016-present
- Predecessor: Yamaha XS 650
- Class: Standard
- Engine: 689.6 cc (42.08 cu in) 2-cylinder liquid-cooled four-stroke engine, DOHC, intake manifold injection, catalyst
- Bore / stroke: 80 mm × 68.6 mm (3.1 in × 2.7 in)
- Compression ratio: 11.5 : 1
- Top speed: 200 km/h (120 mph)
- Power: (55 kW (74 hp)) at 9,000 rpm
- Torque: 68 N⋅m (50 lb⋅ft) at 6,500 rpm
- Transmission: 6-speed sequential manual, chain-drive
- Frame type: Diamond type
- Rake, trail: 25°, 90 mm (3.5 in)
- Wheelbase: 1,405 mm (55.3 in)
- Dimensions: L: 2,075 mm (81.7 in); W: 820 mm (32 in); H: 1,130 mm (44 in)
- Seat height: 81.5 cm (32.1 in)
- Weight: 186 kg (410 lb) (wet)
- Fuel capacity: 14 L (3.1 imp gal; 3.7 US gal)
- Related: Yamaha MT-07/FZ-07; Yamaha XSR900

The Yamaha XSR700 is a motorcycle manufactured by Yamaha. The production takes place in the Yamaha-MBK plant in Rouvroy, France. The launch of the naked bike took place in March 2016.

== Concept ==
Designed by the Japanese motorcycle customizer Shinja Kimura and further developed by the Yamaha design team in Monza, Italy, the XSR700 is designed to enhance the classic lines of the Yamaha XS 650 from 1976 combined with the modern technology of Yamaha MT-07. Central technical assemblies of the MT-07 such as engine, frame, chassis and brake system remained unchanged in the XSR 700. Conceptually, the XSR 700 is compared to the Ducati Scrambler 800.

== 270° crankshaft ==
The XSR700's parallel-twin engine has a 270° crankshaft, whose two cylinders in the engine fire at an irregular interval. This format helps to harmonize the inertia forces inside the engine, resulting in a more responsive and "torquey" sensation for the rider, a feeling not unlike that of a V-twin.
