= Yamaha XSR900 =

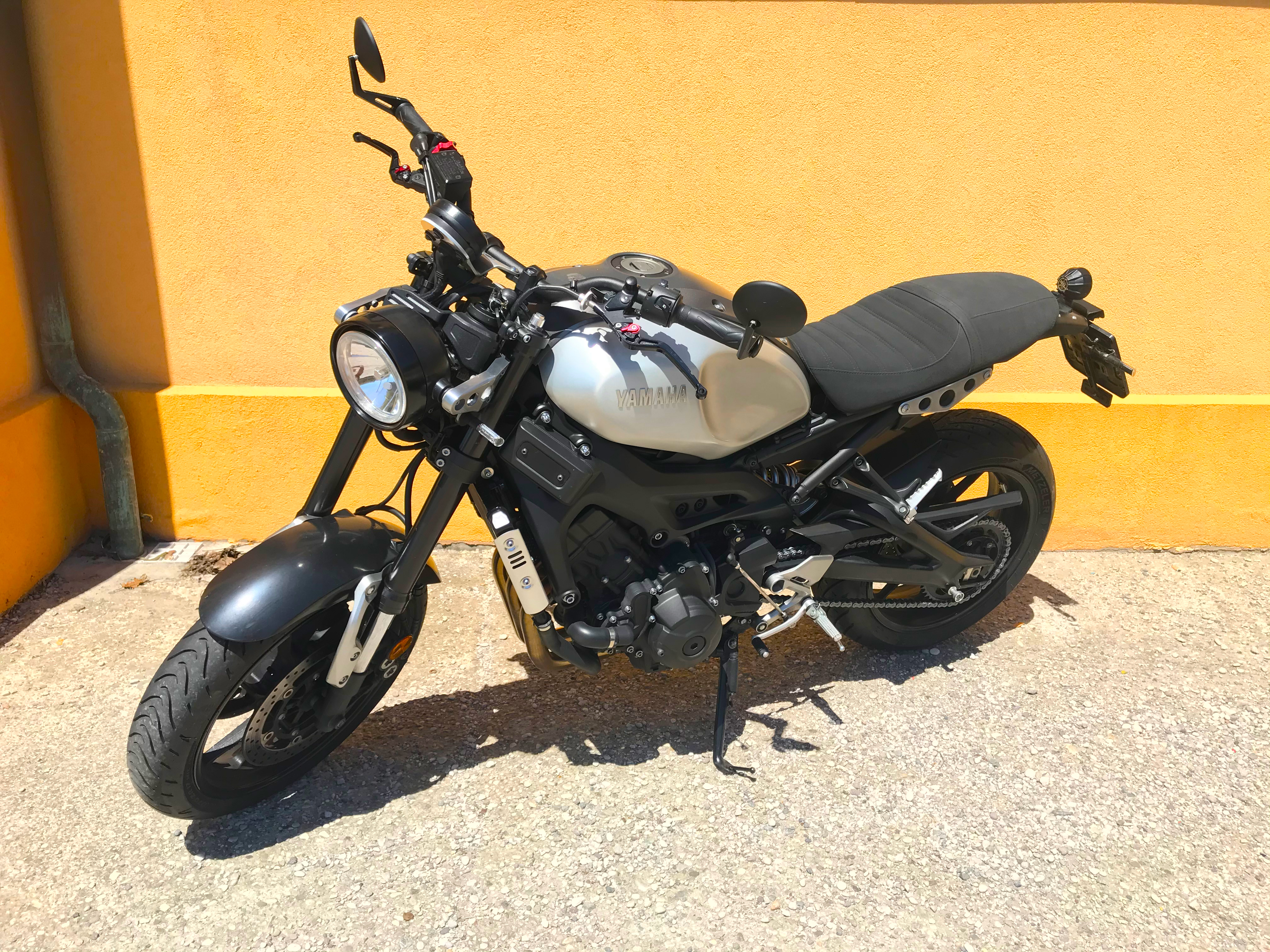
- 2018 Yamaha XSR900
- Manufacturer: Yamaha Motor Company
- Also called: Yamaha XSR
- Production: 2016–present
- Class: Standard
- Engine: 890 cc (54 cu in) liquid-cooled DOHC inline 3-cylinder 4- stroke; 12 valves
- Bore / stroke: 78.0 mm × 62.1 mm (3.07 in × 2.44 in)
- Compression ratio: 11.5:1
- Power: 87 kW (117 hp) @ 10,000 rpm (claimed)
- Torque: 94 N⋅m (69 lb⋅ft) @ 7,000 rpm (claimed)
- Transmission: 6-speed
- Suspension: FRONT: 41 mm Inverted Telescopic Fork adjustable rebound damping and preload (5.4 in.) wheel travel REAR: Single shock, adjustable preload and rebound damping (5.1 in.) wheel travel
- Brakes: Front Dual 298 mm (11.7 in) discs Rear Single 245 mm (9.6 in) disc
- Tires: FRONT: Bridgestone Battlax S22 120/70ZR17; REAR Bridgestone Battlax S22 180/55ZR17
- Rake, trail: 25.0 degrees - 109 mm (4.3 in)
- Wheelbase: 150 cm (58.9 in)
- Dimensions: L: 208 cm (81.7 in); W: 82 cm (32.1 in); H: 114 cm (44.9 in)
- Seat height: 81 cm (31.9 in)
- Weight: 425 lb (193 kg) (wet)
- Fuel capacity: 3.7 US gal (14 L)
- Related: Yamaha XSR700 / FZ-09

Yamaha XSR900 is a neo-retro standard motorcycle which uses an 890 cc (54 cu in) transverse inline-triple engine. Introduced in 2016, the XSR900 is derived from Yamaha's MT-09 (known as FZ-09 in North America).

== Background ==
Yamaha brought the XSR900 to market in 2016 with an 847 cc (52 cu in) transverse inline-triple engine, releasing it in two variants worldwide.

The first, a variant uses a yellow and black paint scheme with a gold-colored inverted fork. This paint scheme is a 60th Anniversary Edition first used on other Yamaha models in 2015, such as the YZF-R1, to commemorate Yamaha's 60 years of racing heritage, which began in 1955. and strongly resembles the classic "speed block" design popularized by Kenny Roberts in the 1970s. The second variant uses a more muted aluminum tank over black frame and black inverted fork.

The 2016-2021 Yamaha XSR900 and MT-09 shared the same 847 cc liquid-cooled DOHC inline three-cylinder engine with a 120° crankshaft. The engine had a power output of 115 hp (86 kW) @ 10,000 rpm and 65 lb⋅ft (88 N⋅m) @ 8,500 rpm. Motorcyclist got a tested 1/4 mile time of 11.07 seconds at 122.33 mph (196.87 km/h). The XSR incorporated several new features, including user-changeable throttle control mappings, a new engine control unit, anti-lock braking system, multiple traction control modes, and stiffened suspension.

== Model updates ==
Little changed from 2016 through 2021; the 2017 XSR900 featured updated tires (the s20 Bridgestone Battlax tires on the 2016 model were discontinued), and revised paint schemes varied according to the market:

- In the USA - Titanium Blue
- In Canada - Blue and Black
- In the UK - Garage Metal, Rock Slate, and Midnight Black

In November 2016, Yamaha announced the 2017 XSR900 Abarth, a limited-edition "Sport Heritage café racer special". Yamaha collaborated with Abarth, an Italian brand from the car-racing world. The Abarth's specification comprises a carbon-fibre nose cowl and a rear seat cowling, handlebars that are low-slung 'clip-on style', rear-sets, traction control, a slipper clutch, and an Akrapovic titanium exhaust. Production of the XSR900 Abarth is to be only 695 units, and each bike is to have a numbered aluminium "authenticity plaque". Yamaha's novel marketing strategy to promote the Abarth prohibited intending buyers from placing an advance order; instead, those who wished to be one of the first 95 to own an Abarth had to make an online bid at 13.00 hr on January 17, 2017. The remaining 600 bikes were to be sold conventionally through dealers.

The 2018 models and onwards support the OEM QuickShifter from Yamaha (OEM Part number BS2-E81A0-V0-00), earlier models need a third-party QS. The support for QS can be checked by turning on the ignition, and a QS indicator should be flashing by in the instrument cluster beside the gear indicator.

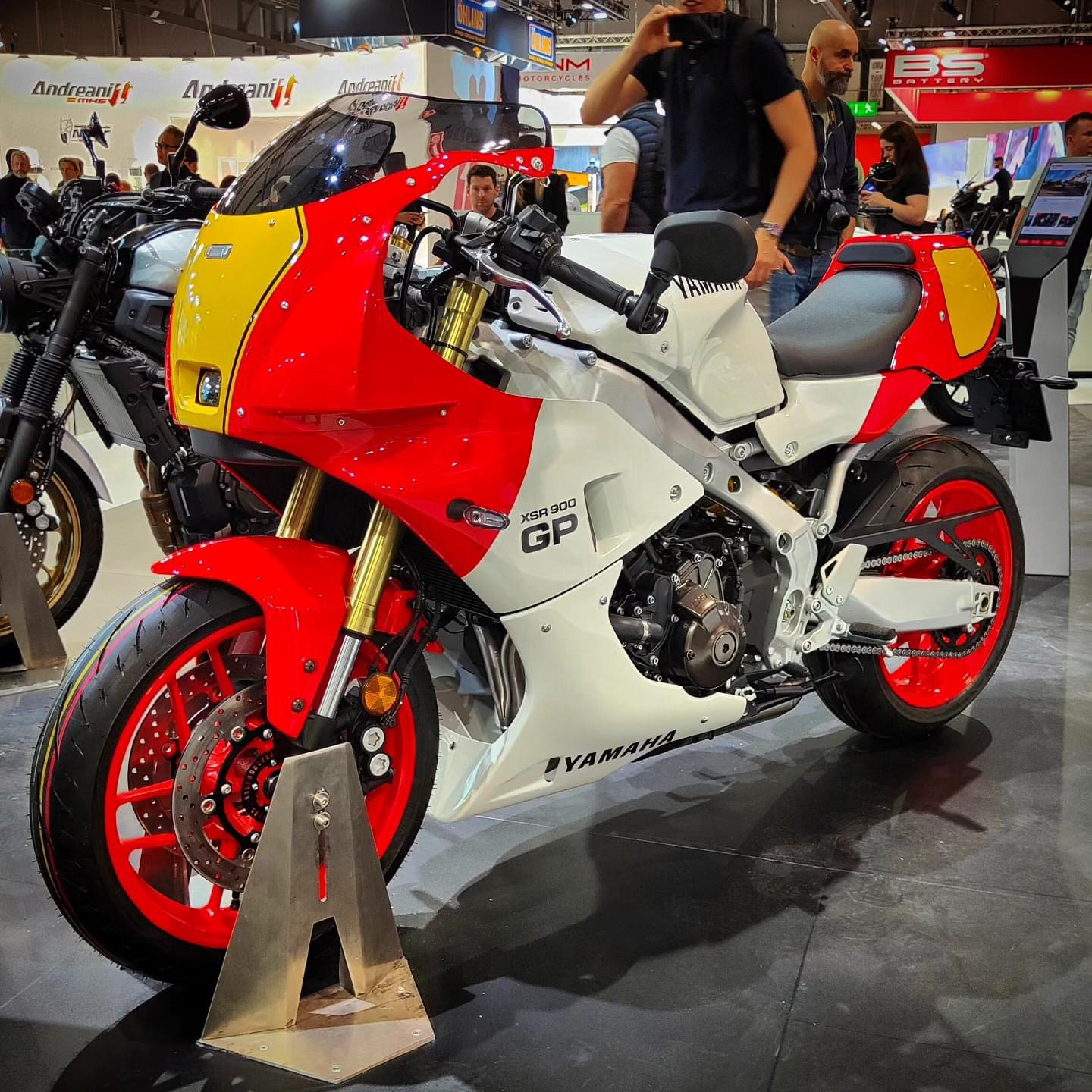
Yamaha XSR900GP

The 2022 model brought sweeping changes amounting to an all-new motorcycle, including the current 890 cc (54 cu in) engine, stiffer and lighter frame, better suspension, updated throttle, updated brakes, lighter spinforged wheels, an electronic rider-aid package including lean angle-aware traction control, lift control, slide control, cornering ABS cruise control, and one additional power mode, bringing the total to 4. Wet weight was reduced by approximately 5 lbs (2.27 kg). The new engine produces 117 peak hp (87 kW) at 10,000 rpm, and 69 ft-lb (94 N-m) peak torque at 7,000 rpm, 1,500 rpm lower than the outgoing engine. The seat height is approximately 1 inch (2.54 cm) lower than the outgoing model.

== Awards ==
On its release, the 2016 XSR900 received journalistic praise, and it gained several awards, including Cycle World's 2016 Best Middleweight Street Bike and G-Mark's 2016 Good Design Award.
