= Crossplane =

Crankshaft with throws extending in two planes

The crossplane or cross-plane is a crankshaft design for piston engines with a 90° angle (phase in crank rotation) between the crank throws. The crossplane crankshaft is the most popular configuration used in V8 road cars.

Aside from the V8 already mentioned, other examples of configurations using such 90° piston phases include straight-2, straight-4, V2, and V4 engines.

Crossplane crankshafts could feasibly be used with a great many other cylinder configurations, but the advantages and disadvantages described below may not apply to any or all of them and must be considered on a case-by-case basis.

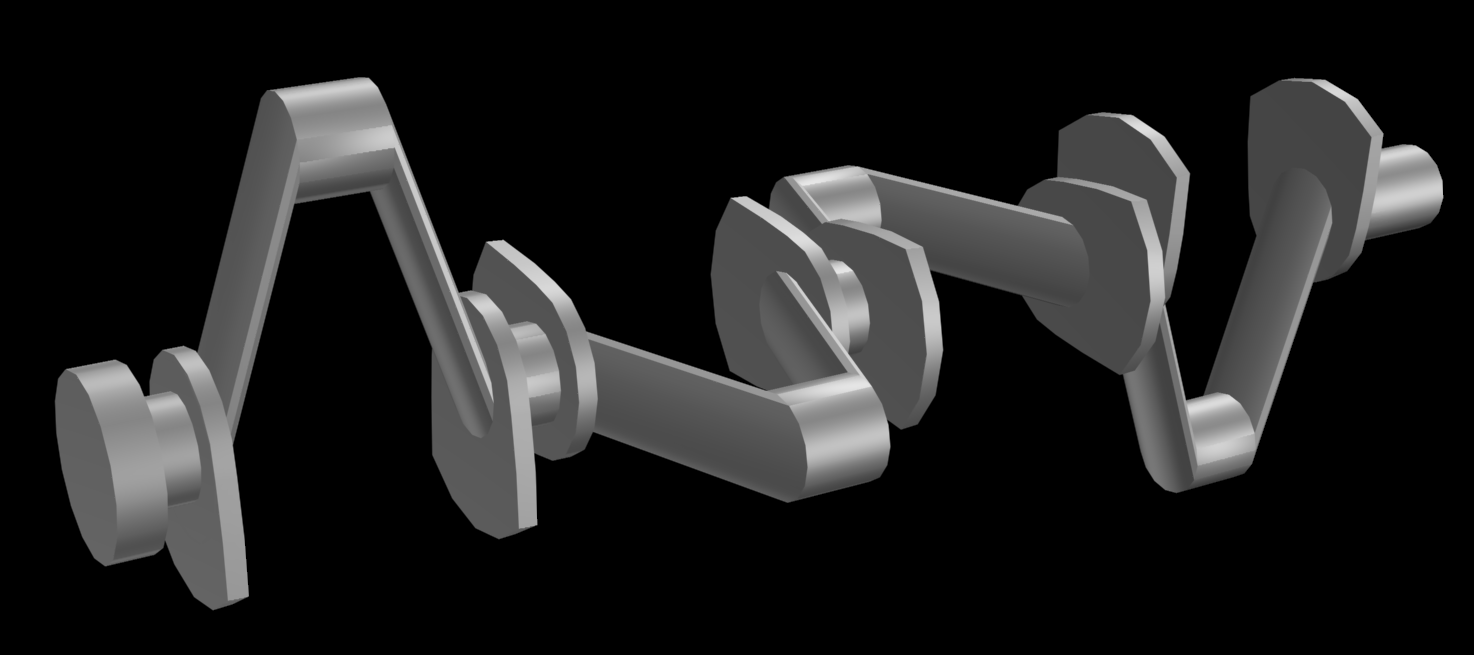
3D model of a cross-plane crankshaft demonstrating the 90-degree angle between the crank throws

== Crossplane V8 crankshaft ==
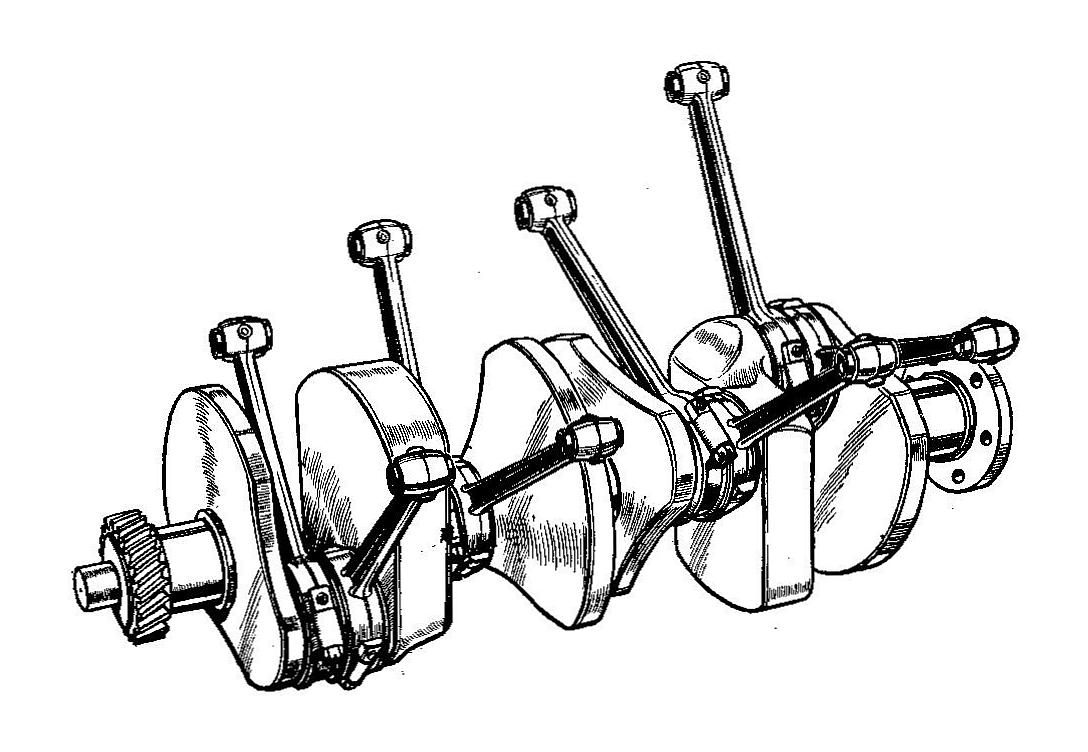
Ford V8 crankshaft

=== Design ===
The most common crossplane crankshaft for a 90° V8 engine has four crankpins, each serving two cylinders on opposing banks, offset at 90° from the adjacent crankpins. The first and last of the four crank pins are at 180° with respect to each other as are the second and third, with each pair at 90° to the other, so that viewed from the end the crankshaft forms a cross.

The crankpins are therefore in two planes crossed at 90°, hence the name crossplane. A crossplane V8 crankshaft may have up to nine main bearings in the case of an eight throw design, and usually has five bearings supporting four throws each with a shared crank pin.

The crossplane design was first proposed in 1915, and developed by Cadillac and Peerless, both of whom produced flatplane V8s before introducing the crossplane design. Cadillac introduced the first crossplane in 1923, with Peerless following in 1924.

=== Balance and smoothness ===
The crossplane V8 was developed to produce a smoother engine than possible with a flatplane design. Because four pistons stop and start together in the same plane in both banks, the second-order forces inherent to the flatplane design stack up and become noticeable in large displacement engines. Each bank of the crossplane engine has four distinct piston phases that cancel the second-order free forces entirely, leaving only minor vibrations due to variation in masses of components during manufacture.

However, the 180° disposition of the end and middle crank throws does result in a primary (crank speed) rocking couple, which in the 90° V case can be countered by weighting the crankshaft appropriately, much like a V-Twin. Other V-angles generally require a balancer shaft to keep things as smooth.

Because of the heavy counterweights on each crank throw, most crossplane V8s have very heavy crankshafts, meaning they are not as free revving in general as their flatplane counterparts. Early Chrysler Hemi V8 had heavy counterweights, but the middle two positions on both sides of the center main bearing (the third of 5 mains) did not have any counterweight. Because these positions are located close to the center of engine, they contribute less to countering any rocking motions - hence the use of external balance weights (e.g. in the crank nose pulley), which requires less extra mass for the same balancing effect.

However, the uneven firing in each bank (see below), as well as the 90° piston phases themselves, do contribute to torsion in the crankshaft which can be noticeable - it is for this reason that crossplane V8s have tuned mass dampers fitted to them, again usually on the free end of the crankshaft.

In later years, racecar engine builders took notice in the high revving potential of flat plane crank V8s. The first hi-RPM flat plane crank engine was developed in Novi, Michigan by Bud Winfield, and raced at the 1941 Indianapolis 500 as the Winfield Special. This engine, later known as the Novi Engine, was raced at Indy up until 1962. In Formula One, in 1962 Coventry Climax adopted the high revving flat plane engine with their Mk.III FWMV in 1963. BRM made the same switch at about the same time, and this carried over into their 1964 P261 F1 car.

=== Firing intervals ===
Four stroke crossplane V8 engines have even 90 degree ignition intervals, but unevenly spaced firing patterns within each cylinder bank.

The firing order on the Left and Right banks are generally LRLLRLRR or RLRRLRLL with each 'L' or 'R' ignition being separated by 90° crank rotation for a total of 720° for eight ignitions. As can be seen by counting four characters to the right of each 'L' or 'R' (4 x 90° = 360°), the cylinders that fire (and thus exhaust) at 360° phase difference reside in opposite banks in a crossplane V8.

The actual intervals in each bank are 180-90-180-270 crankshaft degrees, in various orders depending on the engine, and not usually in the same order in each bank. The exact combinations depends on the crankshaft "handedness", the direction of rotation and which of the 360° pairs is ignited first in the order.

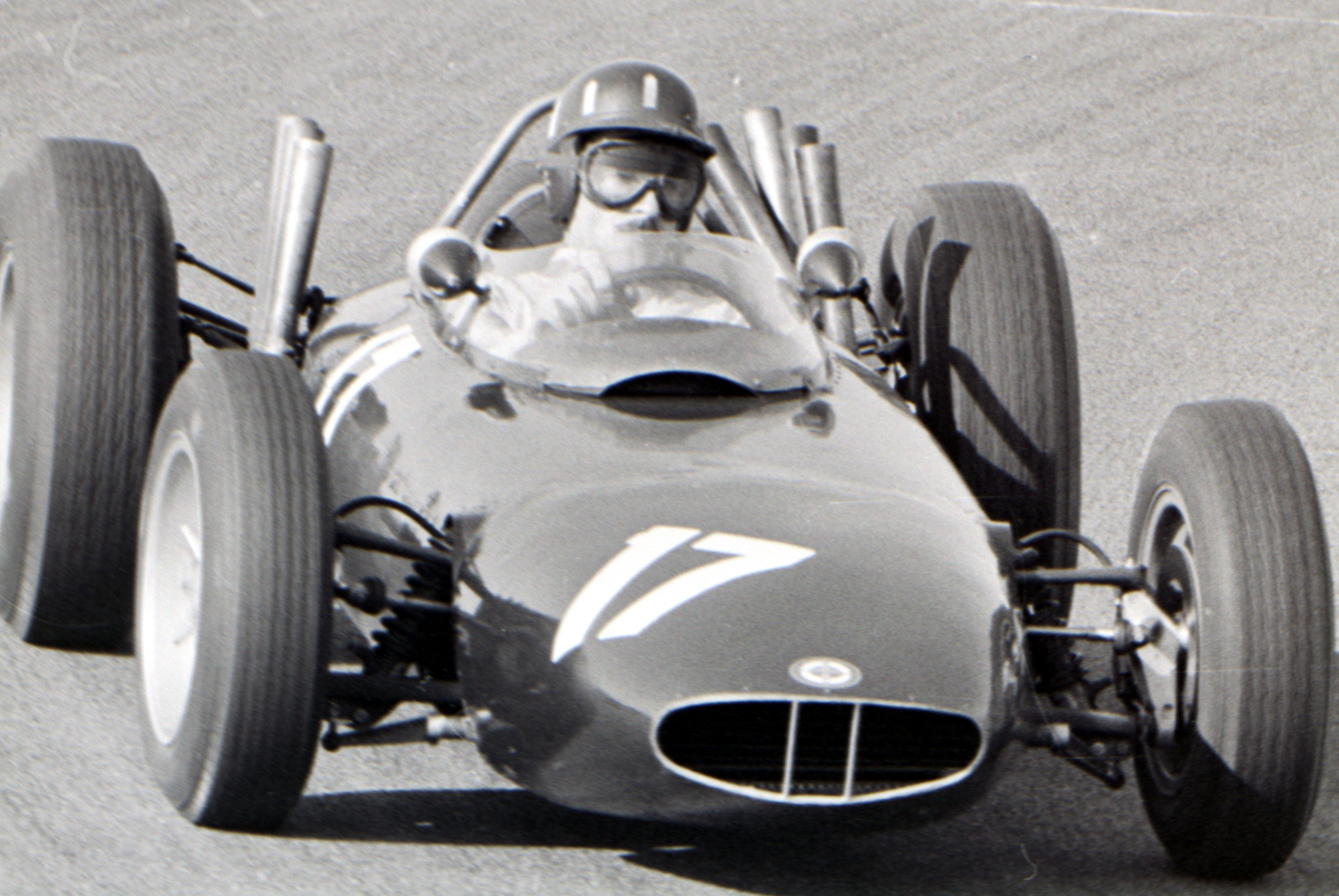
1963 BRM P578 with individual exhaust stacks

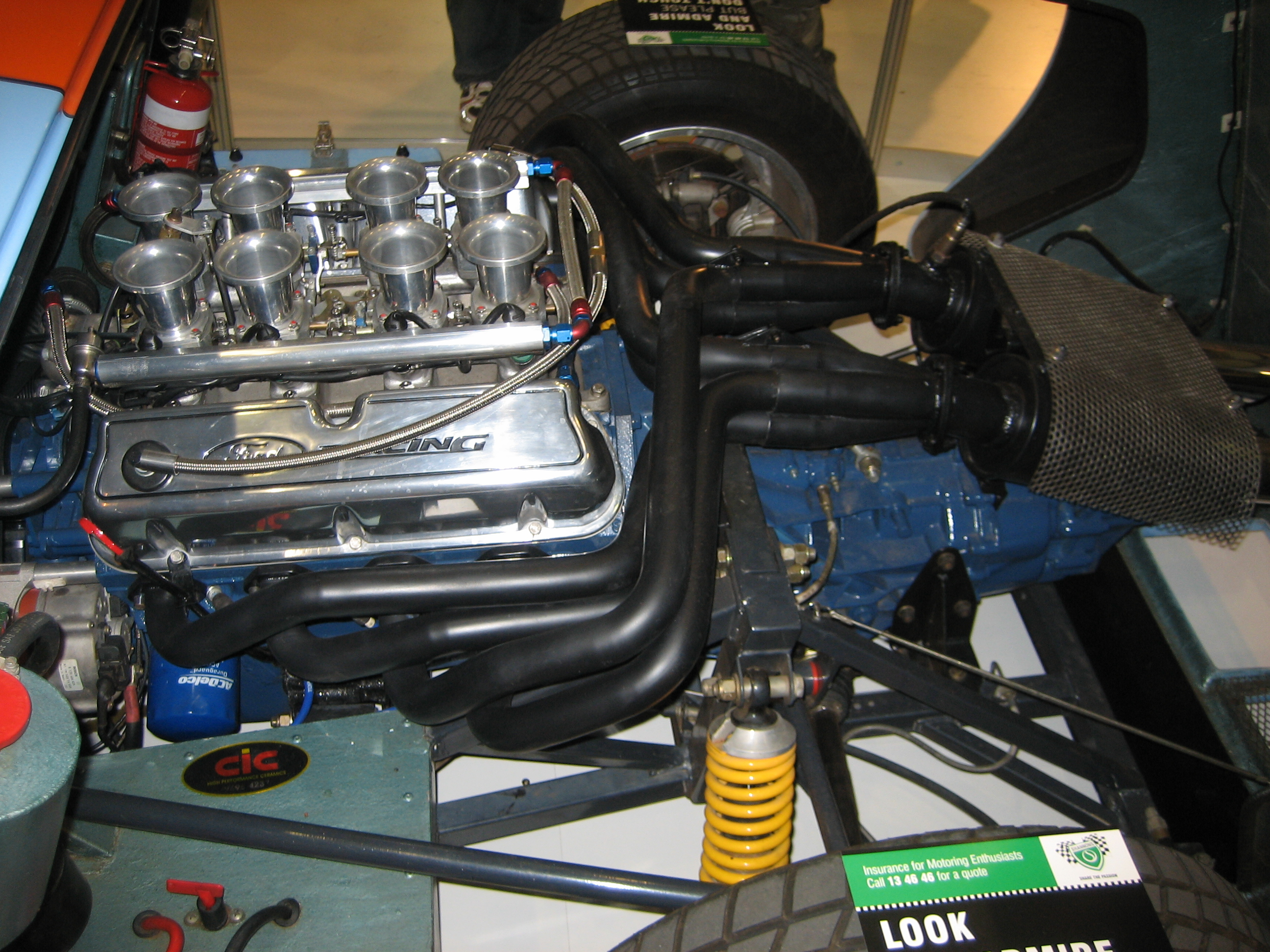
This is a modern, less serpentine street version of the crossover exhaust on a Ford GT40.

==== Sound ====
The characteristic "burble" of a crossplane V8 comes from the exhaust manifold design, which typically merges all four exhaust ports on each bank of four cylinders into one exit for convenience. This accentuates the pattern outlined above, sometimes described as "potato-potato", mimicking the alternating sequential interval and longer gap.

The specific firing order of the engine and the exhaust configuration can lead to subtle variations which may or may not be noticeable to enthusiasts.

Other sounds are possible by careful grouping of the exhaust pulses, but the packaging (space) requirements generally make this unfeasible in road-going machines.

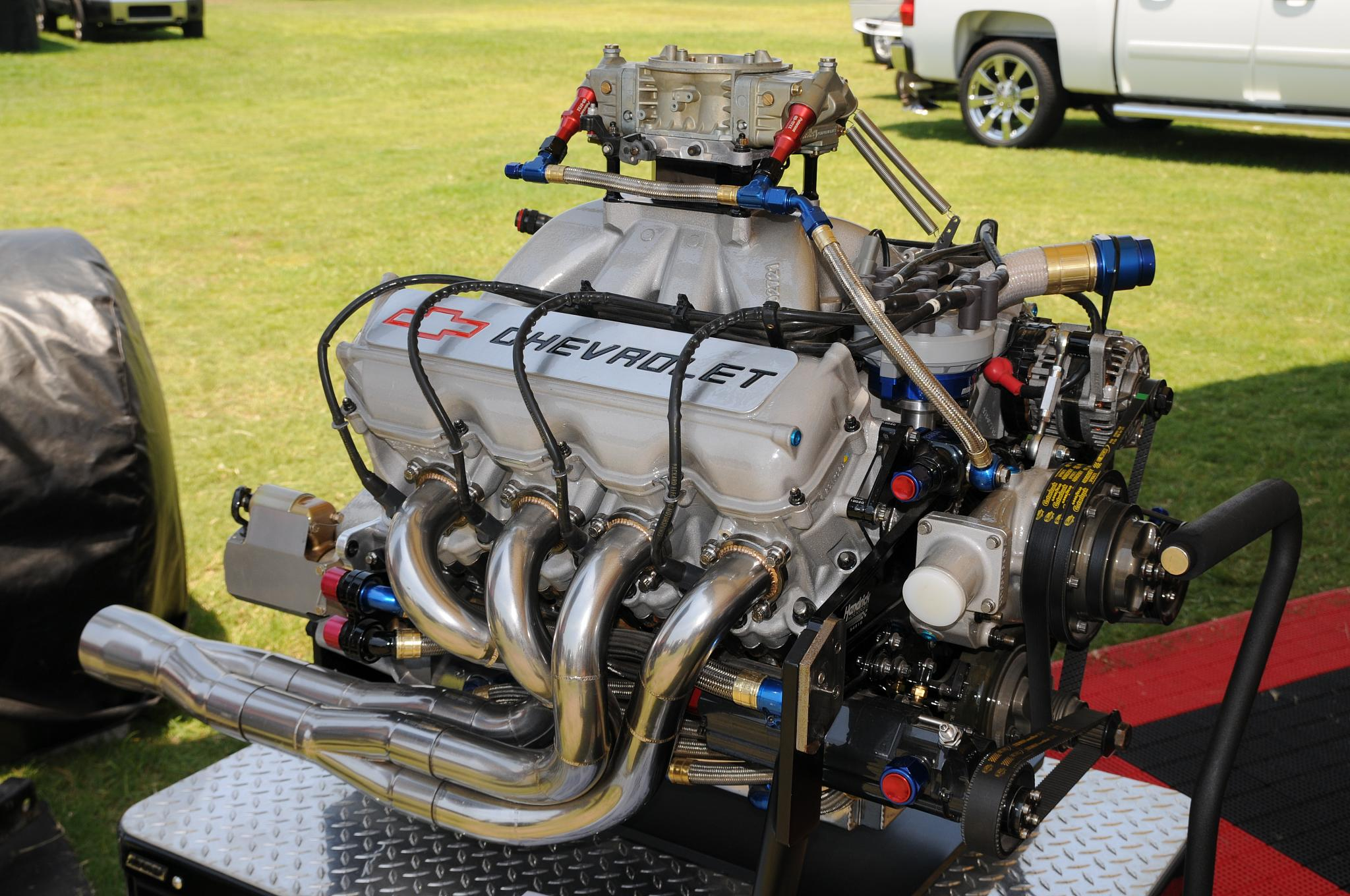
A NASCAR V8 engine with Tri-Y exhaust

==== Tuning ====
Even-firing pairs are disposed in opposite banks, so long equal-length exhaust pipes are needed to merge these pairs and achieve uniform scavenging.

One of the earliest examples of such a tuned exhaust for a crossplane V8 was as fitted to the 1.5 Litre Coventry Climax FWMV Mk.I and Mk.II engines in the early 1960s - these were known to get in the way of servicing the engine itself, however.

Many racing crossplane V8 engines (like Ford 4.2L DOHC V8 for Indy racing) had exhaust ports on the inside of the V angle to make these exhaust pipe lengths shorter and the merges easier to achieve without causing packaging issues. The Ford GT40 made the concept on production-based V8s famous with an elaborate arrangement of long exhaust pipes nicknamed "Bundle of Snakes". Such systems are also sometimes called "180-degree headers", referencing the 180° intervals collected in each branch, similar to a flatplane V8.

Prior to this, straight individual "stack pipes", or "zoomies", were sometimes used (e.g. BRM) to avoid the negative impact of uneven exhaust pulse interference on scavenging, at the cost of not benefiting from the positive extraction effects of merging, as above. Even afterwards on many occasions the performance deficit was accepted and ordinary 4-into-1 systems per bank were employed for convenience. Some of the gap can be made up with performance-oriented 4-into-2-into-1, or "Tri-Y", exhausts, e.g. those used in NASCAR and V8 supercars.

== Inline-four crossplane crankshaft ==
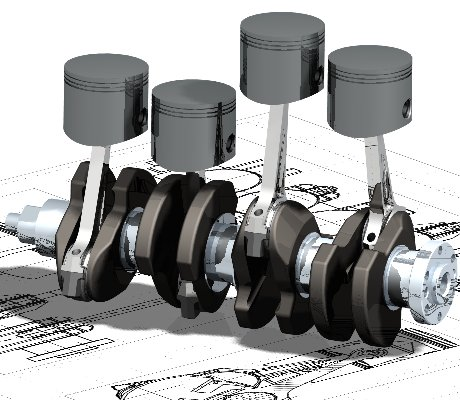
Crank throw orientation is up-left-right-down in this drawing in contrast to flatplane's up-down-down-up.

Unlike in a V8, a crossplane arrangement in inline-four engines results in an unevenly distributed firing pattern, so the use tends to be limited to extremely high-revving engines. In such engines, the advantage of less secondary imbalance outweighs the irregular firing interval disadvantage. This design, not having pistons disposed at 90° to each other in separate banks, requires a balance shaft to counter the rocking vibration disadvantages arising from plane imbalances on reciprocating mass and rotating mass. Please see engine balance article for details.

=== 2009+ Yamaha YZF-R1 ===
The 2009 Yamaha YZF-R1 motorcycle uses a crossplane crankshaft, employing a crank-speed balance shaft to counter the inherent rocking vibration (primary rocking couple) described above.

This was inspired by Yamaha's M1 MotoGP racing models, which continue to use crossplane cranks to this date because of their significant inertial torque advantage at the extreme high rpm operation these engines see. Yamaha claims advances in metal forging technologies made this a practical production sportbike.

=== URS engine ===
The so-called Fath-Kuhn straight-four engine, as used to relative success in motorcycle and side-car racing from 1968 by the private URS racing team, was also a crossplane type. It was a different configuration to that normally used in a V8 or indeed in the Yamaha above, with two of the throws being swapped around - i.e. the throws may be described as being at absolute angles of 0, 90, 180, and 270 degrees, versus the more usual 0, 90, 270, 180. This results in a slightly reduced primary rocking couple, but introduces higher order couples of much lower magnitude.

The different layout was primarily chosen to reduce the impact of the inertial torsion inherent with crank throws spaced 90° apart due to the pistons being accelerated (start-stop motion), given this engine was meant to be high revving and inertial forces scale as to the square of engine speed. The reduction in torsion was achieved by splitting the crank into two separate parts, geared together, from their respective midpoints, via a counter-shaft, from which power was delivered to the gearbox.

It is likely this inertial torsion within the crank is the reason for Yamaha citing crank forging improvements as a reason for the cross-plane crank being viable in a road bike. It is less of an issue in the V8 because each throw is shared by two pistons already offset by 90°.

=== Firing intervals ===
Crossplane crankshafts used in a four-stroke, four-cylinder engine result in uneven firing, since the natural separation of ignition events is (720°/4 =) 180° in such an engine (hence the popularity of 180° flat-plane crank). The firing intervals (the space between ignition events) for the crossplane R1 and URS engines are 90-180-270-180 (crank degrees), but other intervals are possible including those due to so-called big-bang firing orders. The uneven firing is the cause of the distinctive sound of this configuration, which is superficially a combination of the 270-450 (90° V-Twin), 180-540 (180° straight twin) and 90-630 ("twingled" V-Twin) intervals, the dominant interval perceptually being the 270° one.

The 90° throw separation would make the cross-plane crank a natural choice for a two-stroke straight four, providing the advantages of both evenly spaced firing and less secondary vibration when the increased rocking vibrations are countered with a crank-speed balance shaft.

== Straight-twin cranks ==
Straight-twin motorcycle engines (a.k.a. "parallel-twin" and "vertical twin") historically came in two types, neither of which were "cross plane": 360° cranks with their pistons moving in tandem, or 180° cranks with their pistons moving in opposite phase.

Beginning with Edward Turner's Triumph Speed Twin, most classic English 4-stroke roadsters (Triumph, BSA, Norton, Royal Enfield, etc) used the 360° cranks; but in the 1960s, Honda adopted the 180° cranks for its OHC 4-stroke parallel twins, such as the 450cc "Black Bomber" and CB500T. On a small displacement bike, the rocking couple was acceptable without a balance shaft, particularly when compared to a similar sized 360° twin similarly lacking a balance shaft. The 400cc Dream/Hawk CB250/400T replaced the 4 cylinder CB400F, and to obtain smoother running closer, it had a 360° twin with a balance shaft - the even firing of the 360° crank noticeably smoother than the uneven 180° crank.

In 1995, Yamaha fitted 270° crankshaft to its TRX850 and in 1996 to the TDM850 MK2, plus a balance shaft to counter the resulting combination of free forces and rocking couples. The 270° crank has smaller free forces than the 360° crank (but much larger than the 180° crank) and smaller rocking couples than the 180° crank (the 360° crank has no such couple). Whilst firing was as uneven as a 90° V-Twin, the 270° crank was not as uneven as the 180°. The 270° configuration represents a successful compromise and has been adopted for Honda's NC700 and 2016 Africa Twin, Hinckley Triumph's Scrambler and Thunderbird cruiser, Yamaha's MT-07 / FZ-07 and a number of others.

Some customising engineers have modified British and Yamaha XS 650 parallel-twin motorcycles to become 277° engines, close to cross-plane crankshafts (aka offset crankshaft or rephased crankshaft) with success in reducing the vibration from stock 360° vertical-twins. Such modified engines have not been given additional balancing systems, but they can have lighter flywheels since the pistons are never simultaneously stationary, so rotational momentum does not need to be stored up as much to compensate, it is simply transferred between the pistons directly (through the crankshaft). This is seemingly inspired by the earlier work of Phil Irving.

This is a similar principle to that in Yamaha's crossplane four cylinder engines, where the extra two cylinders account for the non-symmetry of piston motion in the upper and lower halves of their strokes, resulting in greater minimisation of the inertial torque caused by changes in rotational momentum.

On 2-stroke parallel-twin engines, the 180° crank configuration was almost universally adopted, giving two power strokes in each revolution. Examples include quite large capacity bikes such as the 598cc Scott Squirrel or 498cc Suzuki T500. Two exceptions with 360° crankshafts are the Yankee, and the military edition of the Jawa 350.

== See also ==
- Cadillac V8 engine
- Flat-plane crank
