= Empty =

Empty may refer to: ‍

== Music ==
=== Albums ===
- Empty (God Lives Underwater album) or the title song, 1995
- Empty (Nils Frahm album), 2020
- Empty (Tait album) or the title song, 2001

=== Songs ===
- "Empty" (The Click Five song), 2007
- "Empty" (Garbage song), 2016
- "Empty" (Juice Wrld song), 2019
- "Empty", by Bebe Rexha from Better Mistakes, 2021
- "Empty", by Belmont from Belmont, 2018
- "Empty", by Blair St. Clair from Identity, 2020
- "Empty", by Boyinaband featuring Jaiden Animations, 2018
- "Empty", by Cane Hill from Kill the Sun, 2019
- "Empty", by Cooliecut, Kin$oul, Craig Xen, and Ski Mask the Slump God from Members Only, Vol. 4, 2019
- "Empty", by the Cranberries from No Need to Argue, 1994
- "Empty", by Harry Chapin from Heads & Tales, 1972
- "Empty", by Janet Jackson from The Velvet Rope, 1997
- "Empty", by King Gizzard & the Lizard Wizard from I'm in Your Mind Fuzz, 2014
- "Empty", by Metric from Live It Out, 2005
- "Empty", by Neurosis from Souls at Zero, 1992
- "Empty", by Olivia O'Brien, 2017
- "Empty", by Paul Kim, 2019
- "Empty", by Pvris from White Noise, 2014
- "Empty", by Raheem DeVaughn from Love Behind the Melody, 2008
- "Empty", by Ray LaMontagne from Till the Sun Turns Black, 2006
- "Empty", by Theatre of Tragedy from Forever Is the World, 2009
- "Empty", by Winner from 2014 S/S, 2014

== Other ==
- Empty (magazine), an Australian visual arts magazine
- Empty (TV series), a 2008 British sitcom

== See also ==
- Emptiness (disambiguation)
- Empty space (disambiguation)
- MT (disambiguation)
