= Blank =

Blank or Blanks may refer to:

- Blank (archaeology), a thick, shaped stone biface for refining into a stone tool
- Blank (cartridge), a type of gun cartridge
- Blank (Scrabble), a playing piece in the board game Scrabble
- Blank (solution), a solution containing no analyte
- A planchet or blank, a round metal disk to be struck as a coin
- Application blank, a space provided for data on a form
- Glass blank, an unfinished piece of glass
- Intake blank, used to cover aircraft components
- Key blank, an uncut key
- About:blank, a Web browser function
- Blank (playing card), playing card in card-point games

== Created works ==
- "Blank" (Eyehategod song), a track on the album Take as Needed for Pain
- Blank (2009 film), a French drama film
- Blank (2019 film), an Indian action thriller film
- The Blanks, an American a cappella group
- "Blank!", a 1957 short story by Isaac Asimov
- [BLANK], a 2019 play by Alice Birch
- Blank (2022 film), a British science fiction film
- "Blank", a song by DaBaby featuring Anthony Hamilton from Baby on Baby 2, 2022

== Names ==
- Blank (horse), a Thoroughbred racehorse and sire
- Blank (surname)

== Blanks ==
- Blanks, Louisiana, an unincorporated community in the United States
- Blanks (musician), Dutch musician and YouTuber
- Ernests Blanks (1894–1972), Latvian publicist
- Jim Blanks (born 1952), American basketball player

== See also ==
- Blanking (disambiguation)
- Blank page (disambiguation)
- Blank space (disambiguation)
