= MT1 =

MT-1, MT-01, MT_{1} or MT 1 may refer to:

- MT 1, Montana Highway 1
- MT-1, Montana's 1st congressional district
- Yamaha MT-01, a motorcycle
- MT-1 airplane, see Manshū Hayabusa
- MT_{1} protein, see Melatonin receptor 1A
