= Blank (surname) =

Blank is a surname. Notable people with the surname include:

- Amanda Blank (born 1983), American rapper and singer
- Arapera Blank (1932–2002), New Zealand poet, short-story writer and teacher
- Arthur Blank (born 1942), American businessman and a co-founder of Home Depot
- Barbie Blank (born 1987), American model and professional wrestler better known as Kelly Kelly
- Boris Blank (musician) (born 1952), Swiss musician
- Carla Blank, American choreographer, writer, and editor
- Daniel Blank, American convicted serial killer
- Hanne Blank (born 1969), American historian
- Harrod Blank (born 1963), American documentary filmmaker
- Irma Blank (1934–2023), German-Italian painter and graphic artist
- Isaac Blank (1913–2006), better known as Ted Grant, South African-British Marxist, co-founder of the Militant Tendency
- Israel Blank, grandfather of Vladimir Lenin from mother's side
- Jessica Blank, American actor, playwright, and novelist
- Joani Blank (1937–2016), writer and videographer
- Johann Blank (1904–1983), German water polo player
- Jonah Blank, American author
- Joost de Blank (1908–1968), Archbishop of Cape Town, South Africa
- Joseph-Theodor Blank (born 1947), German politician
- Julius Blank (1925–2011), semiconductor pioneer
- Karl Blank (1728–1793), Russian architect
- Kenny Blank (born 1977), American actor
- Les Blank (1935–2013), American documentary filmmaker
- Marc Blank, American computer game designer
- Maria Alexandrovna Ulyanova (née Blank) (1835–1916), Vladimir Lenin's mother
- Martin Blank (disambiguation)
- Mel Blanc (né Blank) (1908 – 1989) American voice actor and radio personality - "The Man of a Thousand Voices"
- Monica Blank, American electrical engineer
- Peter Blank (born 1962), German javelin thrower
- Rebecca Blank (1955–2023), American educator
- Renate Blank (1941–2021), German politician
- Stefan Blank (born 1977), German footballer
- Steve Blank (born 1953), entrepreneur
- Theodor Blank (1905–1972), German politician
- Trent Blank (born 1989), American baseball coach
- Victor Blank (born 1942), British businessman
