= Boris Blank =

Boris Blank may refer to:

- Boris Blank (musician) (born 1952), Swiss artist and musician, part of Yello
- Boris Blank (ice hockey) (born 1978), German ice hockey player

== See also ==
- Blank (surname)
