= Hayden Cox =

Australian surfboard designer (born 1982)

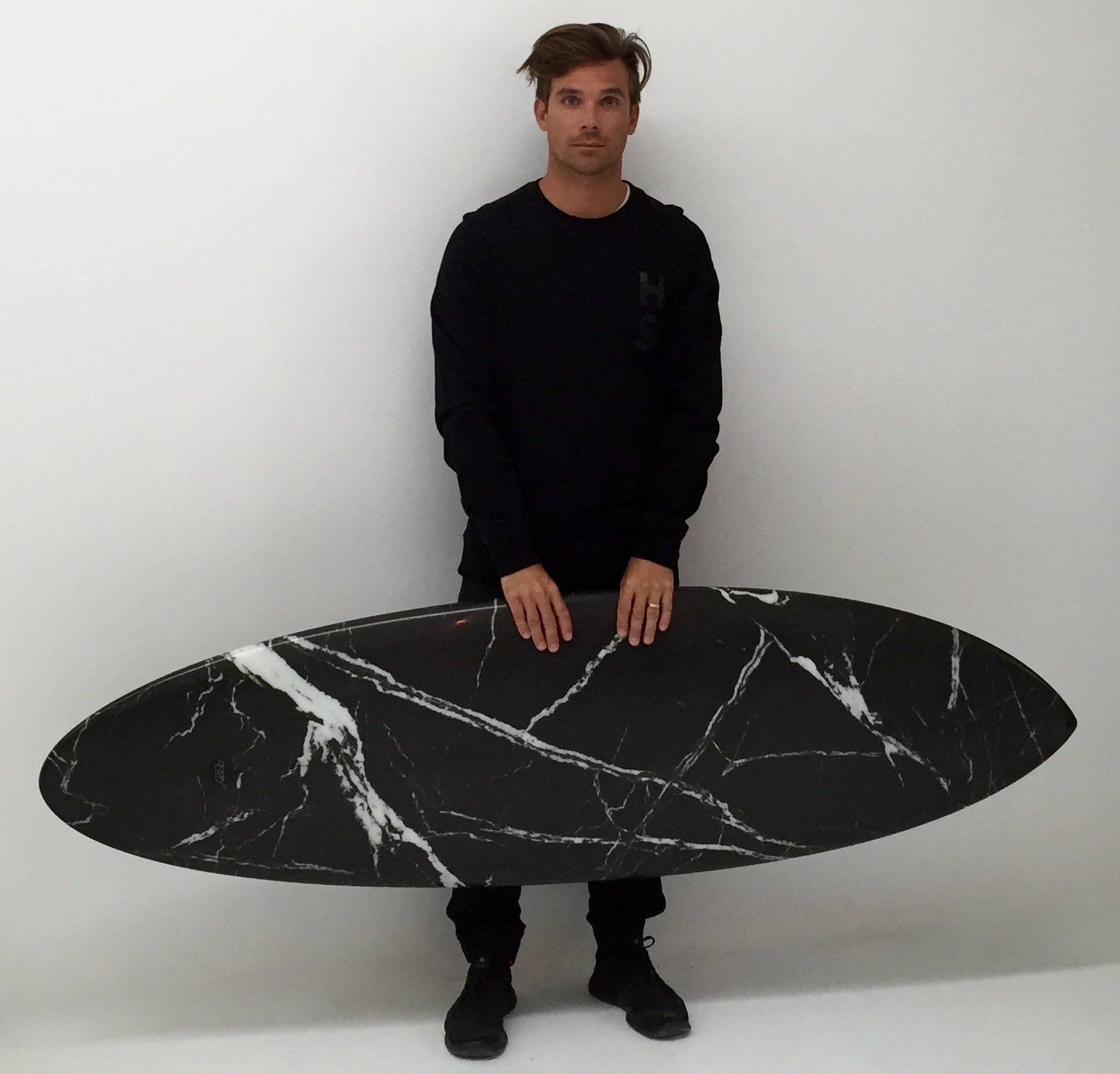
- Born: 7 February 1982 (age 44); Sydney, Australia
- Occupation: Surfboard Designer
- Known for: Founder of Haydenshapes Surfboards and Inventor of FutureFlex

Hayden Cox (born 7 February 1982 in Sydney) is an Australian surfboard designer, entrepreneur and founder of Haydenshapes Surfboards. He is also the inventor of patented parabolic carbon fibre frame surfboard technology FutureFlex sold globally, along with his brand Haydenshapes, in over 70 countries. He is recognised for his innovative use of custom designed materials, modern construction methods and entrepreneurialism in business

== Career ==
At the age of 15, Hayden Cox broke his favourite surfboard and did not have the money at the time to purchase a new one so he decided that he'd learn to make one instead. At the age of 16 he coded his first website and began to sell surfboards under his new business "Haydenshapes Surfboards" to friends, locals and teachers at school. After a short-lived attempt at university to study a degree in business, Hayden decided to focus solely on his budding surfboard business and opened his first factory in Mona Vale, New South Wales at the age of 20. Determined to reinvent the design and construction of the traditional 'wooden stringer' surfboard, he began experimenting with unique materials and construction techniques to test new flex patterns and how it affected performance. Former world champion surfer and fellow Sydney Northern Beaches local Tom Carroll was the first person to road test Cox's newly created prototype "FiberFlex" (now known as FutureFlex), which was later refined and launched into the market in 2006. Following the success of the brand launch into the global market and worldwide best selling Haydenshapes design "Hypto Krypto", Cox relocated to Los Angeles where set up a second custom factory and office facility.

Hayden Cox has collaborated on a number of notable design projects in conjunction with Haydenshapes Surfboards with key brands, some of which include Alexander Wang (designer), Audi and Quiksilver. In 2014 he spoke on stage at international design event Semi-Permanent and exhibited a first of its kind surfboard installation at Carriageworks Sydney.

Cox married Danielle Foote in 2015.

== Awards ==
- 2015 USA Surfboard of the Year 2015 (Surf Industry Manufacturers Association)
- 2015 Surfboard of the Year 2015 (Australian Surf Industry Awards)
- 2014 Surfboard of the Year (Australian Surf Industry Awards)
- 2014 " Sport & Leisure" Award (Australian Good Design Awards)
- 2011 News.com.au Entrepreneur of the Year Award ( News Corp Australia)
