= Nicholas Felton =

Nicholas Felton may refer to:

- Nicholas Felton (bishop) (1556–1626), English academic and bishop
- Nicholas Felton (graphic designer), infographic designer
