= Blank space =

Blank space may refer to:

- Space (punctuation), a blank area devoid of content used to separate characters in writing
  - Whitespace character, any character that represents a space in typography
- "Blank Space", a 2014 song by Taylor Swift from 1989
- "Blank Space", a 1999 song by Busdriver from Memoirs of the Elephant Man
- "Blank Space", a 2007 song by Tanya Chua from Goodbye & Hello
- Blank Space, a 2025 nonfiction book by W. David Marx

== See also ==
- Empty space (disambiguation), an unoccupied area or volume
- White space (visual arts), white unmarked space within art
- Blank (disambiguation)
- Space (disambiguation)
