= MT =

MT, Mt, mt, and other variants may refer to:

== Arts and entertainment ==
=== Gaming ===
- MT Framework, a proprietary game engine

=== Literature and journalism ===
- M. T. Vasudevan Nair, a Malayalam writer
- Maaseudun Tulevaisuus, a Finnish newspaper
- Meridian Tonight, a British regional news programme
- Motor Trend, an automotive magazine
- The Moscow Times
- The Musical Times, a classical music journal
- Tramways & Urban Transit formerly Modern Tramway, a British magazine

=== Music ===
- Marianas Trench (band), a Canadian pop rock band
- Master tone, a form of musical ringtone
- Modern Talking, a band
- The Musical Times, a classical music journal

=== Other media ===
- Magical Trevor, a cartoon by Jonti Picking
- Megatokyo, a webcomic
- MT, a fictional character in the television series Infinity Train
- Megatron (Transformers), a fictional robot/character in the Transformers franchise
- Musical theatre

== Businesses and organizations ==
- MT-Propeller, a German aircraft propeller manufacturer
- Mauritius Telecom, a telecommunications and Internet service provider
- Media Temple, a website hosting company
- Mississauga Transit, a public transit operator in Mississauga, Ontario
- Monotype Corporation, a font company
- Movable Type, a weblog publishing system
- Thomas Cook Airlines (IATA airline designator code MT)

== Military ==
- Motor transport
- Military time

== Places ==
- Mt or Mt., an abbreviation for the word mount, meaning mountain
- Malta (ISO 3166-1 alpha-2 code MT), a nation of Mediterranean islands
  - .mt, the top-level Internet domain for Malta
  - Maltese language (ISO 639 alpha-2 language code mt)
- Martin, Slovakia (vehicle plate code MT)
- Matera, Italy (vehicle plate code MT)
- Mato Grosso (ISO 3166-2:BR subdivision code MT), a state in Brazil
- Mississippi Territory, defunct subdivision of the US
- Montana (postal code MT), US
- Mountain Time Zone, a time zone in North America

== Religion ==
- Gospel of Matthew, a part of the New Testament
- Masoretic Text, the Hebrew text of the Jewish Bible (Tanakh)

== Science, technology, and mathematics ==
=== Biology and medicine ===
==== Biology ====
- Medial temporal, part of the temporal lobe of the brain
- Metallothionein, a protein
- Methyltransferase, a type of enzyme
- Microtubule, a component of the cytoskeleton
- Middle temporal area, a region of the visual cortex (also called V5) where the motion of objects is analyzed
- Mitochondrion, an organelle found in most eukaryotic cells

==== Medicine ====
- Magnetization transfer, a process contributing to image contrast in Magnetic resonance imaging
- Massage therapy, adding directed pressure to the body
- Massage therapist, the title of someone who performs massage therapy
- Music therapy, the clinical use of music to improve health and quality of life
- Medical technologist, a healthcare professional who performs diagnostic tests
- Medical transcriptionist, an allied-health professional who transcribes dictated medical reports
- Motivational therapy, a treatment for substance abuse
- Methyltestosterone

=== Computing and telecommunications ===
- .mt, the top-level Internet domain for Malta
- MT Framework, a proprietary game engine
- Machine translation, a subfield of computational linguistics
- Magnetic tape data storage, a digital recording method using magnetic tape
- Megatransfer, in computing, equal to one million transfer operations per second
- Mersenne twister, a pseudorandom number generator algorithm
- Mistype, a declaration of a mistake or typo when typing in a live-text platform such as instant messenger
- Mobile-terminated, a call, text message or data received on a mobile telephone
- Mobile Terminal, part of a Mobile Station in the GSM system architecture
- Multithreading (computer architecture), in computer hardware
- Multithreading (software), in computer software
- Multi-topology routing (also abbreviated MTR), an extension to the OSPF internet routing protocol (RFC 4915)

=== Mathematics and logic ===
- Modus tollens, a concept in logic

=== Transportation ===
- Honda MT, a motorcycle
- Yamaha MT series, a family of motorcycles
- Hyundai Mega Truck, a medium-duty truck
- Manual transmission, a part of a car
- MT or Marquitrans, a Spanish microcar

=== Units of measurement ===
- Megatesla (MT), the SI unit of magnetic flux density
- Megaton (Mt), a TNT equivalent unit of explosive power
- Megatonne (Mt), a unit of mass equal to one billion kilograms (10^{9} kg)
- Megatransfer, in computing, equal to one million transfer operations per second
- Metric ton (t), equal to one thousand kilograms
- Millitesla (mT), the SI unit of magnetic flux density

=== Other uses in science and technology ===
- Machine taper, a system for securing accessories to a machine tool (or Morse taper, one particular type of machine taper)
- Magnetotellurics, a method of imaging underground structures
- Materials Today, a scientific journal
- Maxim–Tokarev, a Russian light machine gun
- Meitnerium, symbol Mt, a chemical element
- Focal mechanism, also known as "moment tensor"

== Other uses ==
- MT (footballer) (born 2001), Matheus Nunes Fagundes de Araújo, Brazilian footballer
- Maltese language (ISO 639 alpha-2 language code "mt")
- Management team
- Master of Arts in Teaching, a graduate degree in teaching; some schools use MT (Master of Teaching) rather than MAT
- Membership Training, trips taken by South Korean university students for the purpose of team building
- Motor Tanker or Motor Transport, in the name of a ship
  - Merchant vessels Motor Tanker or Motor Tug Boat (name prefix MT)
- Muay Thai, a Thai martial art

== See also ==
- The Maria Theresa thaler, generally abbreviated MTT but sometimes also seen as MT
- TM (disambiguation)
