= Yamaha MT-03 =

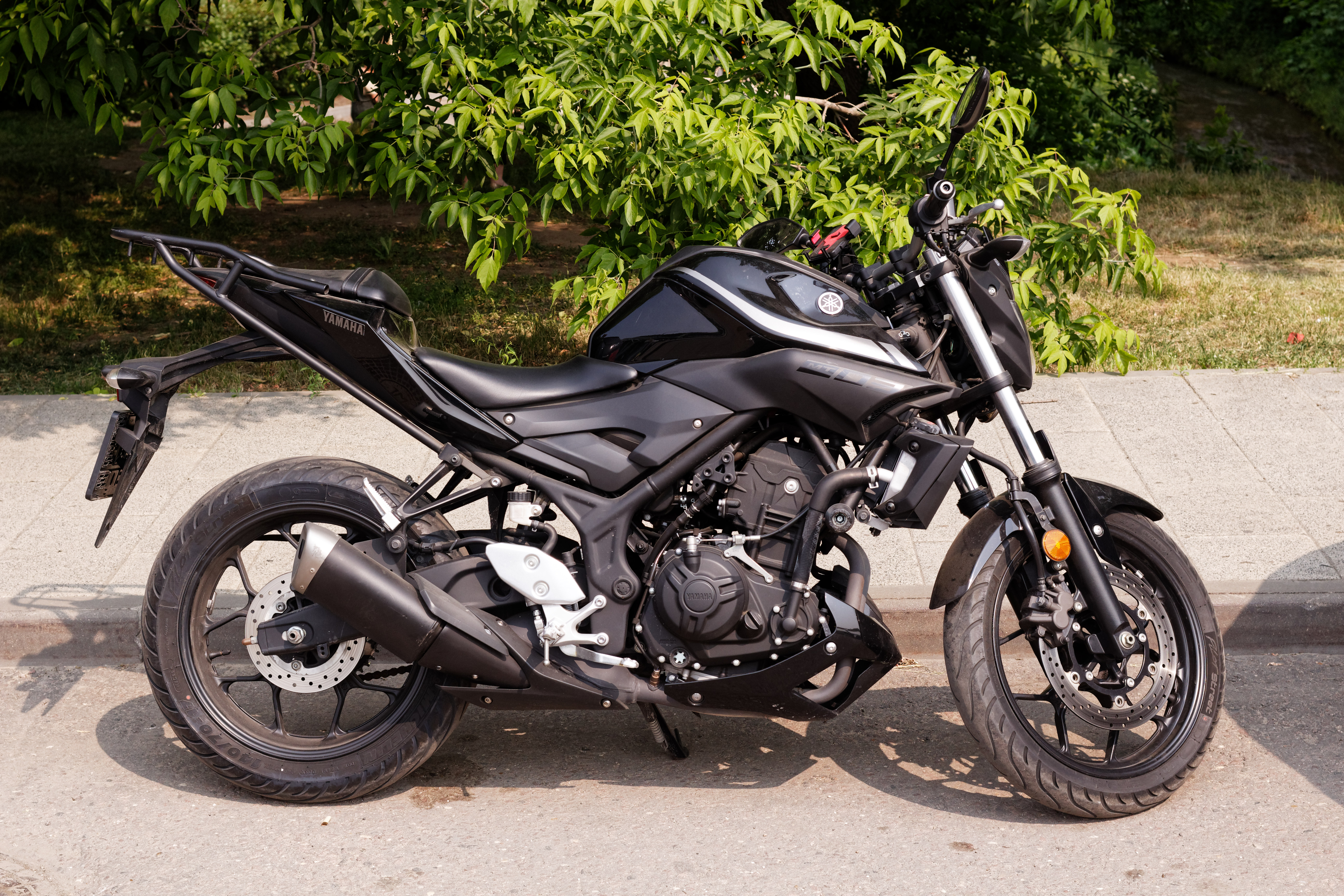
- Manufacturer: Yamaha Motor Company
- Parent company: Yamaha Corporation
- Production: 2006–2014; 2016–present
- Class: Standard

The Yamaha MT-03 is a MT series naked motorcycle produced by Yamaha Motor Company since 2006. It is available worldwide. Early models had a single-cylinder engine - following a break in production in 2015 later ones are parallel twins.

== 2006–2014 ==
2006–2014
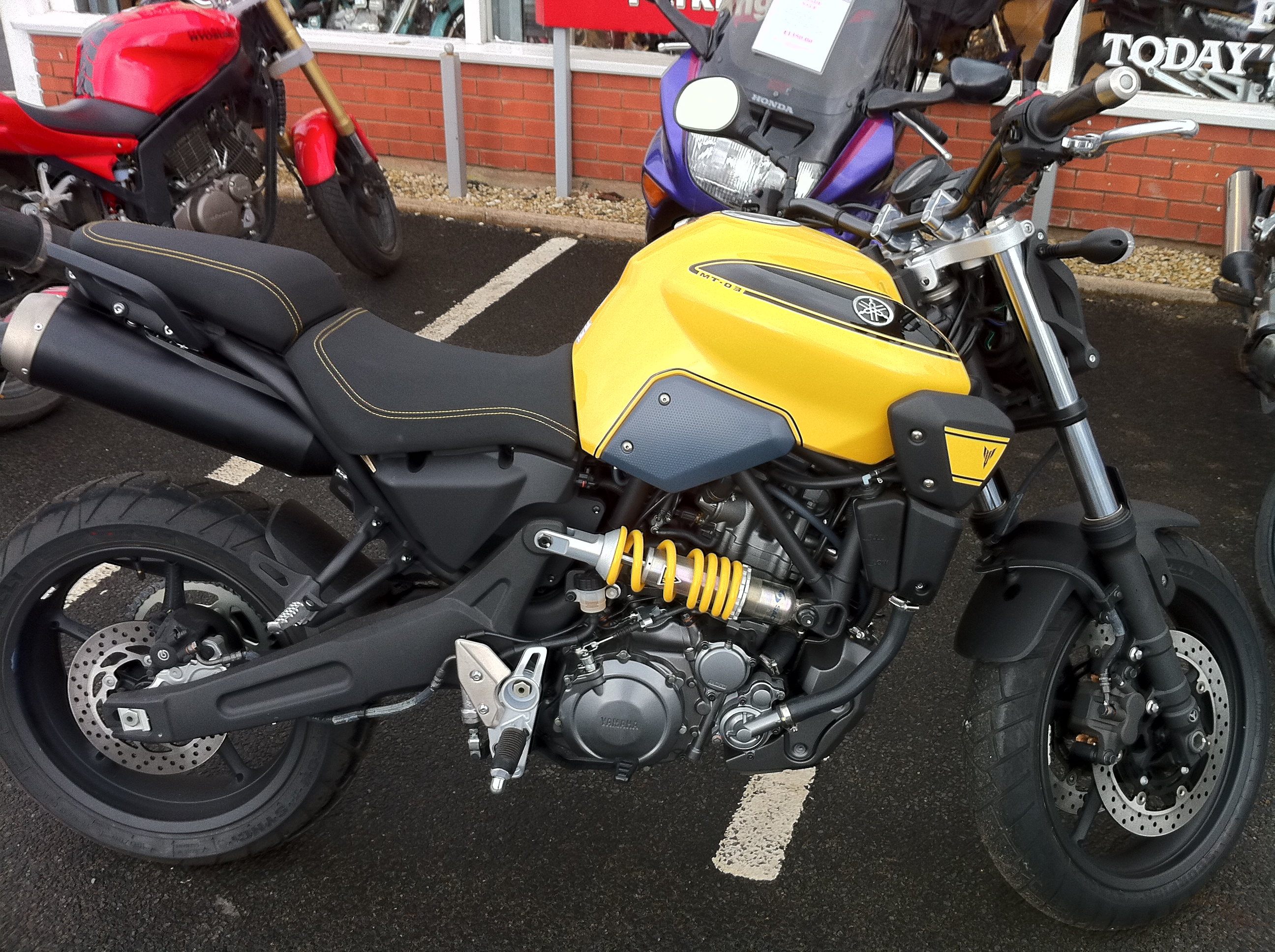
- Engine: 660 cc (40.3 cu in) liquid-cooled 4-stroke SOHC single-cylinder
- Bore / stroke: 100.0 mm × 84.0 mm (3.9 in × 3.3 in)
- Compression ratio: 10.0:1
- Top speed: 160 km/h (100 mph)
- Power: 36 kW (48 hp) @ 6,000 rpm.
- Torque: 56 N⋅m (41 lb⋅ft) @ 5,250 rpm
- Transmission: 5-speed, wet clutch, multiple-disc
- Suspension: Front: Telescopic fork Rear: Swingarm (link type)
- Brakes: Front: Dual 298 mm hydraulic discs Rear: Single 245 mm hydraulic disc
- Tires: Front: 120/70-17; Rear: 160/60-17
- Rake, trail: 26°, 97 mm (3.8 in)
- Wheelbase: 1,420 mm (56 in)
- Dimensions: L: 2,070 mm (81 in); W: 860 mm (34 in); H: 1,115 mm (43.9 in)
- Seat height: 805 mm (31.7 in)
- Fuel capacity: 15 L (3.3 imp gal; 4.0 US gal)
- Oil capacity: 5 L (5.3 US qt)
- Turning radius: 2,225 mm (87.6 in)
- Related: Yamaha MT-01

The first version of the MT-03 was produced from 2006 to 2014. Its engine is derived from the XT660R.

== 2016–2019 ==
2016–2019
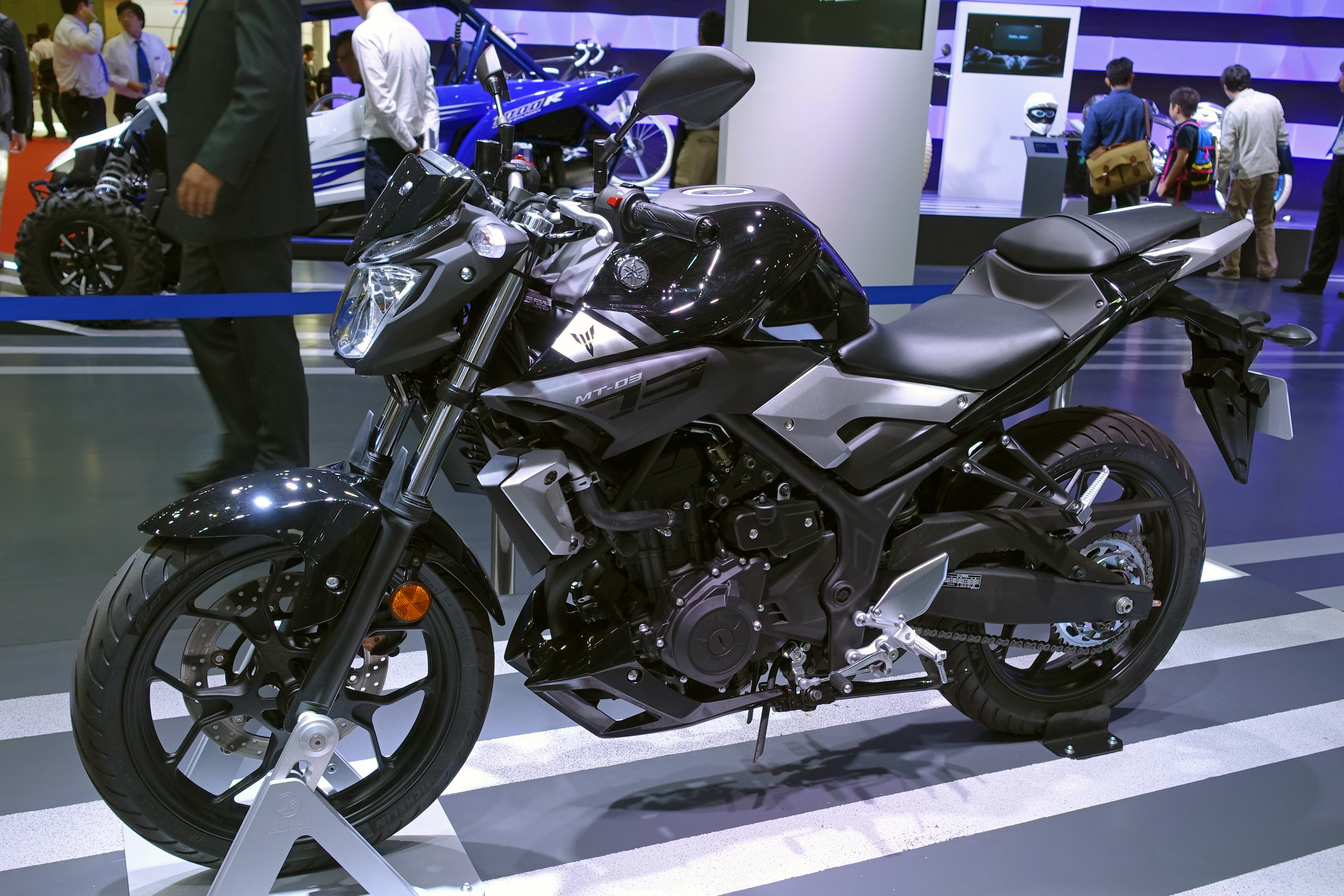
- Assembly: Indonesia: Karawang, West Java (Yamaha Indonesia Motor Manufacturing)
- Engine: 320.3 cc (19.5 cu in) liquid-cooled 4-stroke 8-valve DOHC inline-twin
- Bore / stroke: 68.0 mm × 44.1 mm (2.7 in × 1.7 in)
- Compression ratio: 11.2:1
- Power: 30.9 kW (41.4 hp) @ 10,750 rpm
- Torque: 29.6 N⋅m (21.8 lbf⋅ft) @ 9,000 rpm
- Transmission: 6-speed constant mesh
- Frame type: Steel diamond
- Suspension: Front: 41 mm Telescopic fork Rear: Swingarm
- Brakes: Front: Single 298 mm hydraulic disc Rear: Single 220 mm hydraulic disc
- Tires: Front: 110/70-17; Rear: 140/70-17
- Rake, trail: 25°, 95 mm (3.7 in)
- Wheelbase: 1,380 mm (54 in)
- Dimensions: L: 2,090 mm (82 in); W: 745 mm (29.3 in); H: 1,035 mm (40.7 in)
- Seat height: 780 mm (31 in)
- Fuel capacity: 14 L (3.1 imp gal; 3.7 US gal)
- Oil capacity: 2.4 L (2.5 US qt)
- Related: Yamaha MT-25; Yamaha YZF-R3

In 2016, Yamaha reintroduced the MT-03, which is now based on the YZF-R3 sport bike.

The MT-03 received an update in October 2019. This refresh marks the first MT-03 to be made available in the United States.

== 2020–2024 ==
In 2019, Yamaha announced its new 2020 MT-03 edition. The new 2020 model now comes with differently tuned rear suspension and new inverted forks; an MT series exhaust; and an LED back-light. In addition to this, new items have been added to the multi-function panel making the upgraded dash more user-friendly. The bike also has a redesigned split seat. The model is expected to be available to purchase early 2020.
