= Empty (magazine) =

Australian bi-monthly magazine

Empty magazine
- Editor: Andrew Johnstone
- Categories: Design, culture, art
- Frequency: Bi-monthly
- Publisher: Design is Kinky
- Total circulation: 12,000
- First issue: 2004
- Country: Australia
- Language: English
- Website: www.emptymag.com

Empty was a cult Australian creative magazine published in the early 21st century. It was concerned largely with printed design work, photography, illustration and film, created for the professional creative community.

The magazine was published by Sydney-based Design is Kinky studio, curators of the Semi-Permanent design festival, a fixture in design culture's global landscape, which occurs annually in Australia.

The magazine served largely as a gallery of artwork, both domestic and international. It also featured cultural commentary and interviews with artists, animators, other magazines, and so on. Interview subjects included Mark Andrews, head of story on The Incredibles (cover story, issue 2, late 2004) and Dan Houser of Rockstar Games (issue 3, early-2005).

Empty was launched in April 2004 and was published somewhat arbitrarily, but usually bimonthly. It featured little to no advertising.

The editor was Andrew Johnstone, creator of Empty and the above-mentioned Design is Kinky and Semi-Permanent.

The magazine enjoyed newsstand distribution, but was distributed only within Australia.

== Staff ==
- Editor Andrew Johnstone
- Art Direction Design is Kinky Studio
