= Yamaha YZF-R25 =

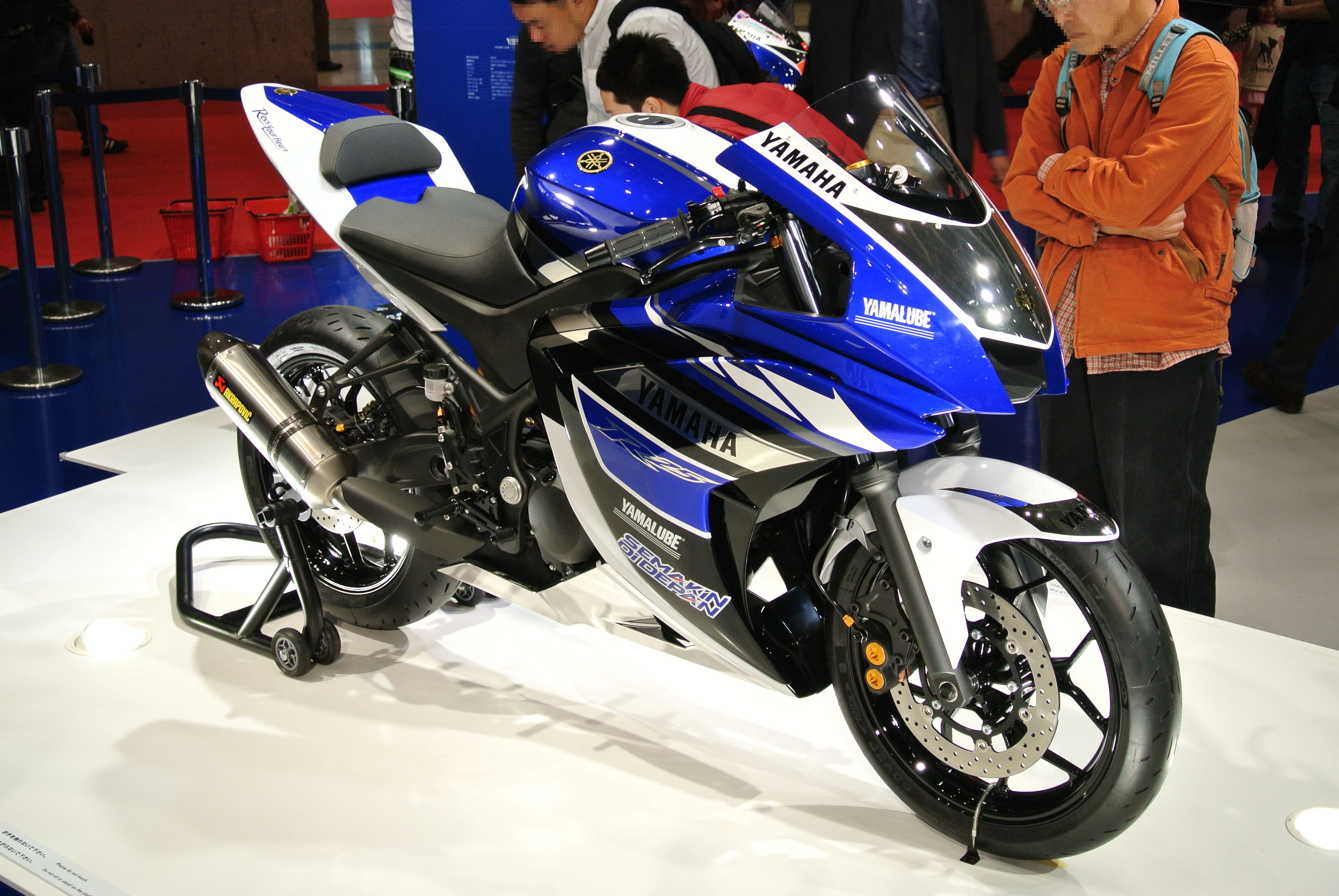
- 2013 Yamaha YZF-R25
- Manufacturer: Yamaha Motor Company
- Also called: Yamaha R25
- Parent company: Yamaha Corporation
- Production: 2014–present 2015–present (MT-25)
- Assembly: Indonesia: Karawang, West Java (Yamaha Indonesia Motor Manufacturing)
- Class: Sport bike Naked bike
- Engine: 250 cc (15.3 cu in) liquid-cooled 4-stroke 8-valve DOHC inline-twin
- Bore / stroke: 60.0 mm × 44.1 mm (2.4 in × 1.7 in)
- Compression ratio: 11.6:1
- Power: 26.5 kW (35.5 hp) @ 12,000 rpm
- Torque: 22.1 lb⋅ft (30.0 N⋅m) @ 10,000 rpm
- Transmission: 6-speed constant-mesh, manual
- Frame type: Steel diamond
- Suspension: Front: 41 mm telescopic fork Rear: swingarm
- Brakes: Front: Single 298 mm hydraulic disc Rear: Single 220 mm hydraulic disc
- Tires: Front: 110/70-17; Rear: 140/70-17
- Rake, trail: 25°, 95 mm (3.7 in)
- Wheelbase: 1,380 mm (54 in)
- Dimensions: L: 2,090 mm (82 in); W: 720 mm (28 in); 745 mm (29.3 in) (MT-25); H: 1,135 mm (44.7 in); 1,035 mm (40.7 in) (MT-25)
- Seat height: 780 mm (31 in)
- Fuel capacity: 14.3 L (3.1 imp gal; 3.8 US gal)
- Related: Yamaha YZF-R3; Yamaha MT-03

The Yamaha YZF-R25 is a motorcycle manufactured by Yamaha since 2014. It is Yamaha's first 250 cc sport motorcycle since the four-cylinder FZR250 that was sold between 1986 and 1994. A first for Yamaha twins, in common with the R3, the R25 uses an offset cylinder design.

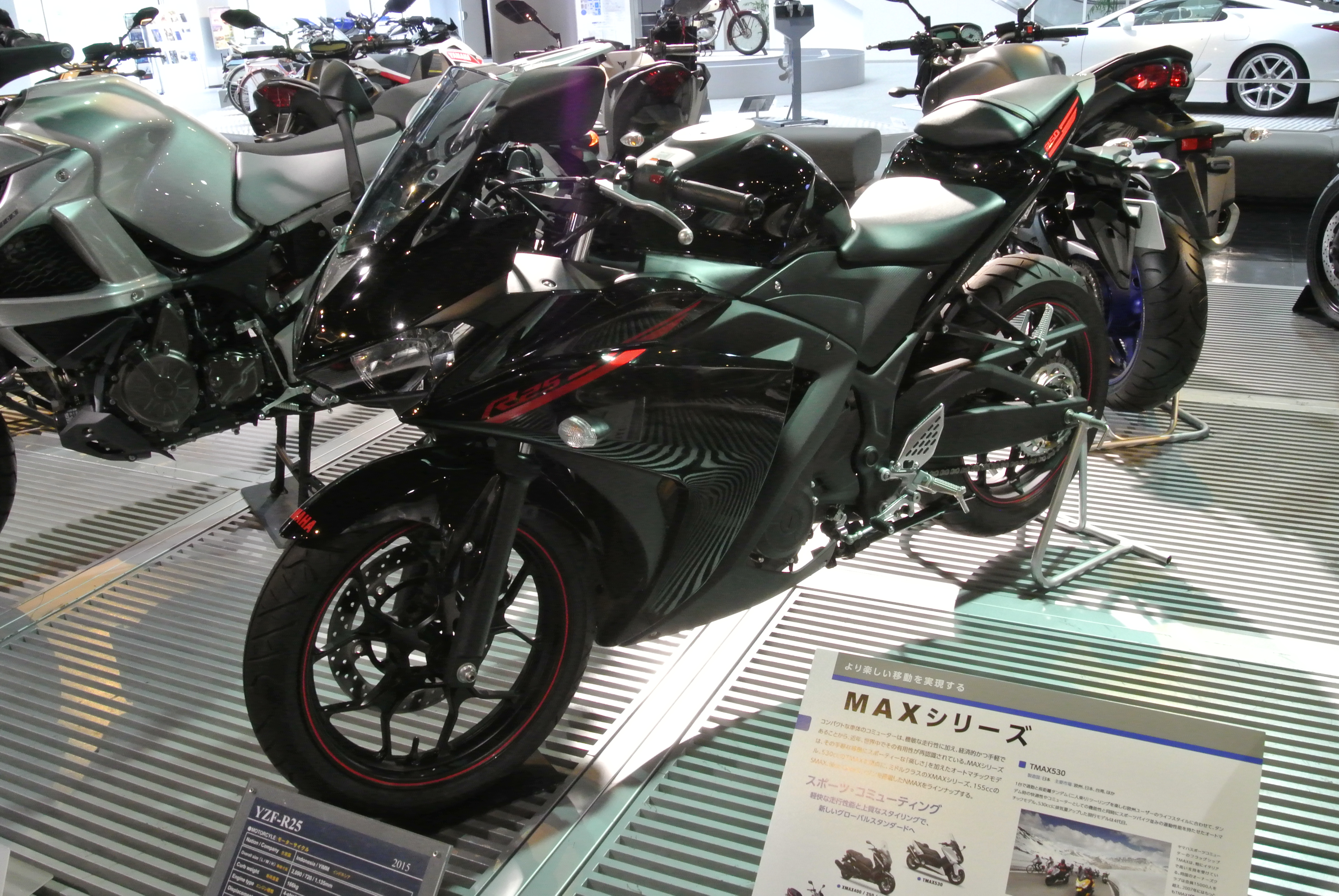
2015 Yamaha YZF-R25

The YZF-R25 was updated for 2019.

== Yamaha MT-25 ==
The Yamaha MT-25 is the naked bike version of the YZF-R25, part of the MT series of standard motorcycles and manufactured by Yamaha since 2015.

The MT-25 received an update in October 2019.

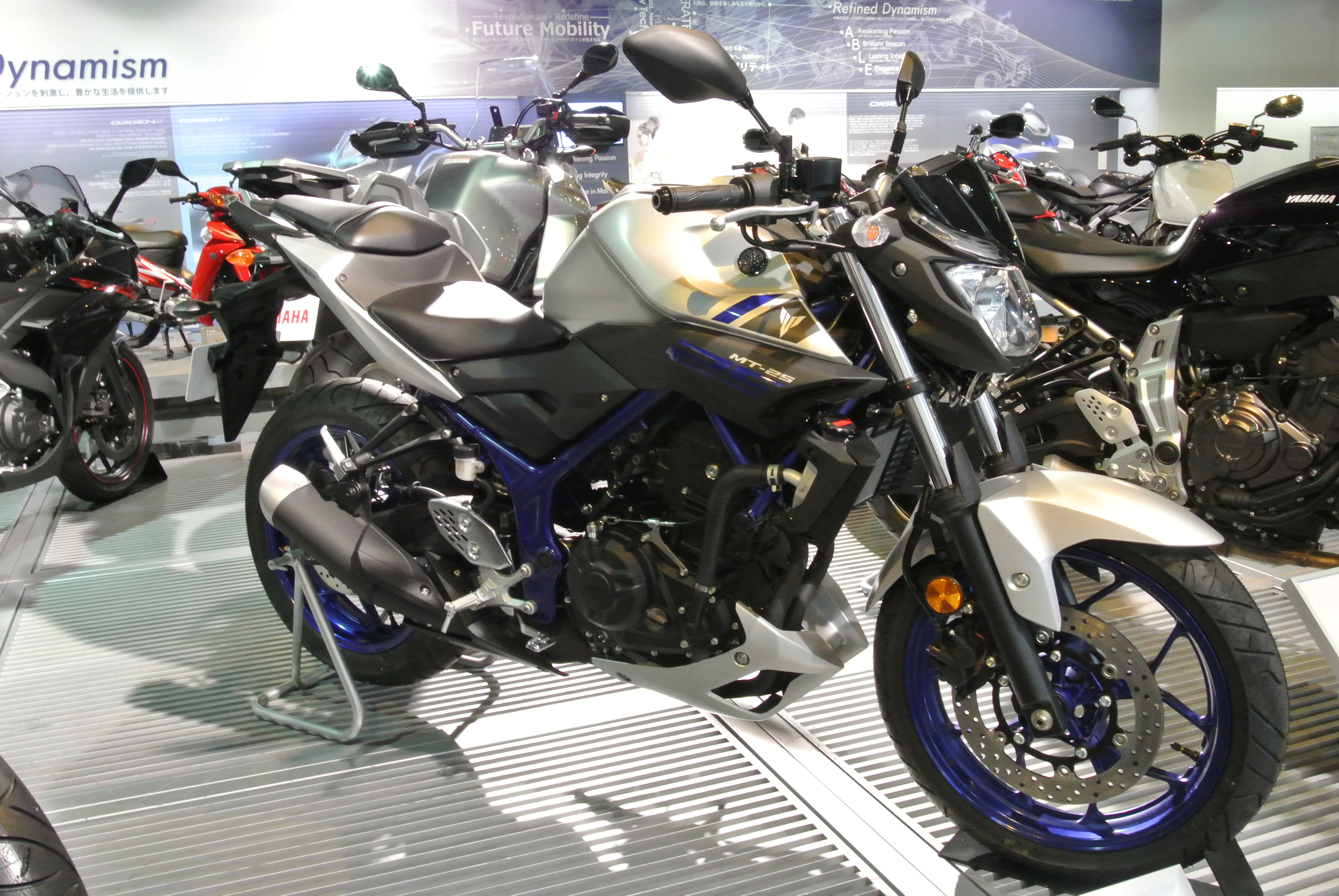
2016 Yamaha MT-25
