= Underneath the Radar (song) =

1988 single by Underworld

Single by Underworld

from the album Underneath the Radar
- B-side: "Big Red X"
- Released: April 1988 (US)
- Genre: Synth-pop
- Length: 6:05
- Label: Sire
- Songwriters: Karl Hyde; Rick Smith; Alfie Thomas
- Producer: Rupert Hine

Underworld singles chronology
"Underneath the Radar" (1988)	"Glory! Glory!" (1988)

Music video
- "Underneath the Radar" on YouTube

"Underneath the Radar" is a song by British electronic music group Underworld, released in April 1988 from their debut album, Underneath the Radar (1988). It was featured prominently in the fifth-season premiere of Miami Vice, during the opening aerial shots of Miami and subsequent nightclub shootout. The Morse code in the first 30 seconds of the song reads "Think global, act local". Commercially, the song reached number two in South Africa, number five in Australia, number 14 in New Zealand, number 69 in Canada, and number 74 in the United States.

Big Brother Australia 2006 contestant Danielle Foote released a cover of the song in 2006 as her debut single which reached number 41 on Australia's ARIA Singles Chart.

== Track listings ==
7-inch and cassette single

A. "Underneath the Radar" (edit)
B. "Big Red X"

UK 12-inch single

A1. "Underneath the Radar" (8:00 remix)
B1. "Underneath the Radar" (6:00 dub)
B2. "Big Red X"

International 12-inch single

A1. "Underneath the Radar" (12-inch remix) – 8:00
A2. "Underneath the Radar" (instrumental) – 6:35
B1. "Big Red X" – 4:59
B2. "Underneath the Radar" (dub) – 6:00

== Charts ==
=== Underworld version ===
==== Weekly charts ====
Chart (1988)	Peak position
Australia (ARIA)	5
Canada Top Singles (RPM)	69
New Zealand (Recorded Music NZ)	14
South Africa (Springbok Radio)	2
US Billboard Hot 100	74

==== Year-end charts ====
Chart (1988)	Position
Australia (ARIA)	23
South Africa (Springbok Radio)	16

=== Danielle version ===
Chart (2006)	Peak position
Australia (ARIA)	41
