= Yamaha YZF-R3 =

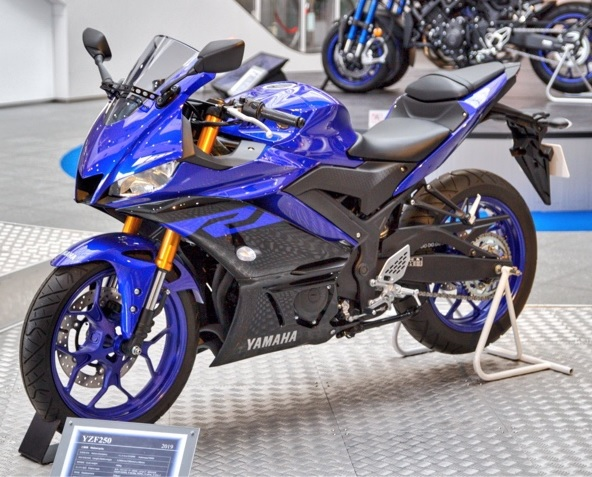
- 2019 YZF-R3
- Manufacturer: Yamaha Motor Company
- Production: 2015–present
- Assembly: Indonesia: Karawang, West Java (Yamaha Indonesia Motor Manufacturing); Brazil: Guarulhos, São Paulo (Yamaha Motor da Amazônia) (since 2022)
- Class: Sport bike
- Engine: 320.3 cc (19.55 cu in) liquid-cooled 4-stroke 8-valve DOHC 180° inline-twin
- Bore / stroke: 68.0 mm × 44.1 mm (2.68 in × 1.74 in)
- Compression ratio: 11.2:1
- Top speed: 181 km/h (112 mph) (Estimated) 166 km/h (103 mph)
- Power: 31 kW (42 hp) @ 10,750 rpm (claimed) 27.4 kW (36.7 hp) @ 10,750 rpm (rear wheel)
- Torque: 21.8 lb⋅ft (29.6 N⋅m) @ 9,000 rpm (claimed) 19.8 lb⋅ft (26.8 N⋅m) @ 9,100 rpm (rear wheel)
- Transmission: 6-speed constant mesh
- Frame type: Steel diamond
- Suspension: Front: 41 mm telescopic fork Rear: swingarm
- Brakes: Front: Single 298 mm hydraulic disc Rear: Single 220 mm hydraulic disc
- Tires: Front: 110/70-17H; Rear: 140/70-17H
- Rake, trail: 25°, 95 mm (3.7 in)
- Wheelbase: 1,380 mm (54 in)
- Dimensions: L: 2,090 mm (82 in); W: 735 mm (28.9 in); H: 1,140 mm (45 in)
- Seat height: 780 mm (31 in)
- Weight: 167 kg (368 lb) (wet)
- Fuel capacity: 14.0 L (3.1 imp gal; 3.7 US gal)
- Oil capacity: 2.1–2.5 L (2.2–2.6 US qt)
- Fuel consumption: 4.2–4.9 L/100 km; 67–58 mpg_{‑imp} (56–48 mpg_{‑US})
- Related: Yamaha MT-03; Yamaha YZF-R25; Yamaha YZF-R Series

The Yamaha YZF-R3, commonly R3, is a 321 cc (19.6 cu in) parallel-twin sport bike made by Yamaha since 2015. The R3 and the R25 are the first Yamaha twins with an offset cylinder design.

== Design ==
The Yamaha R3 is an entry-level sport motorcycle in the same range as other 250–400 cc motorcycles like the Kawasaki Ninja 300, Honda CBR300R, and KTM 390. It has some design similarity to the R25, such as the engine which uses a downdraft induction fuel injection system, and the 10-spoke cast aluminum wheels reduce Unsprung mass. The cylinders are all-aluminum.

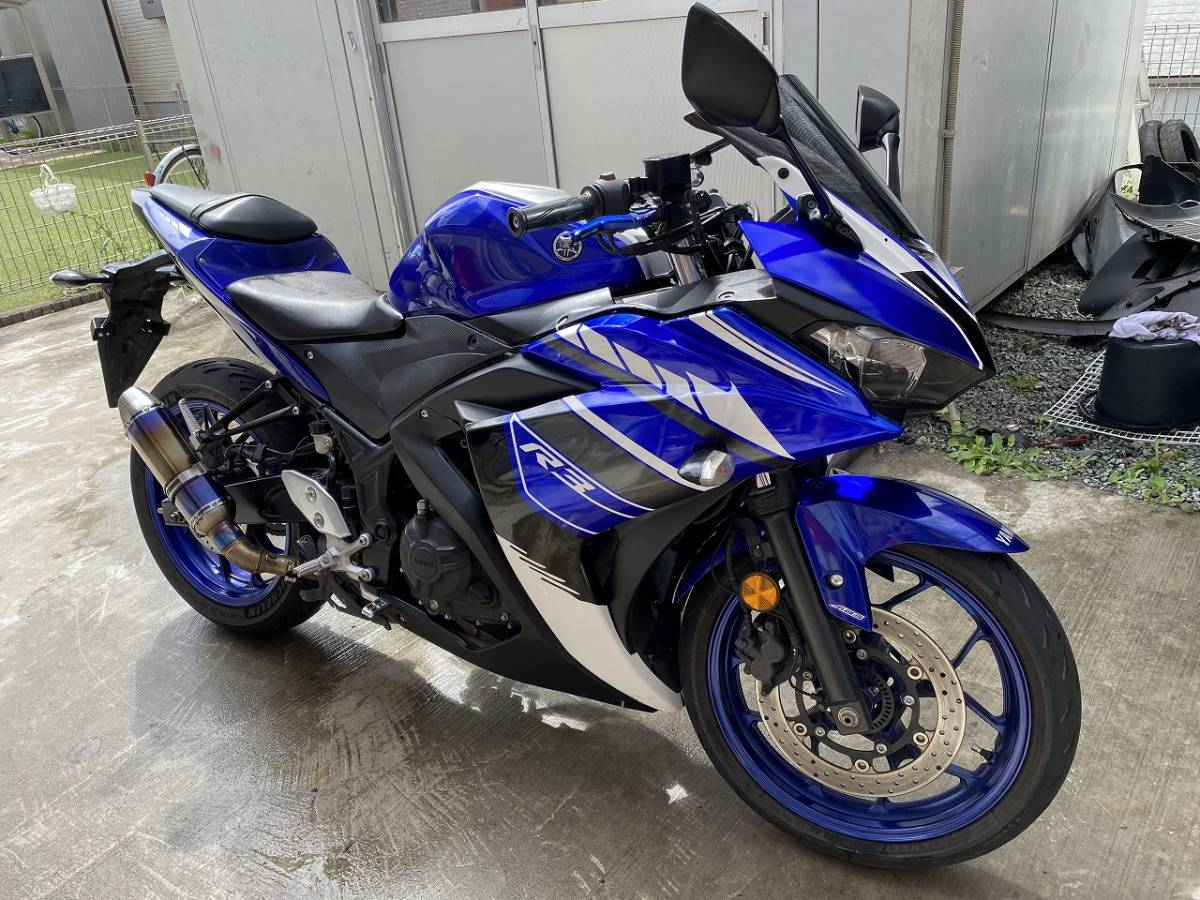
2015 Yamaha YZF-R3

For 2017, the YZF-R3 offers optional ABS. The 2018 Model has dual channel ABS and is EURO 5 compliant.

The YZF-R3 was updated for 2019. The update brought a new fairing design, KYB upside down forks and the clip-on handlebars lowered by 22mm. The update also saw a revised fuel tank cover to improve cornering capability, as well as a full LCD, replacing the analogue needle in the old model. The 2019 model was available in 3 different colours: Yamaha Black, Icon Blue and the 60th Anniversary Edition colours, which featured a special white, red and gold livery.

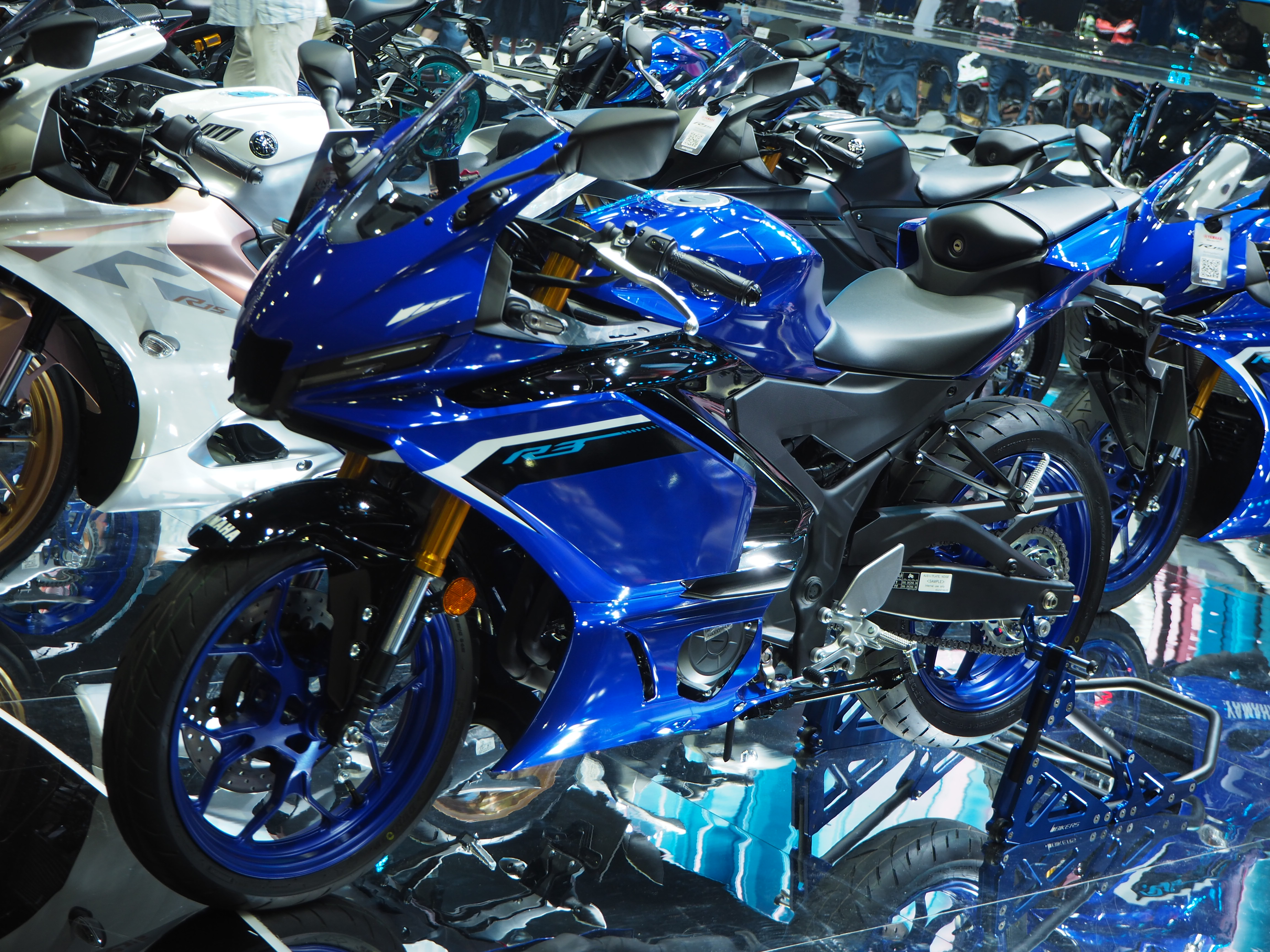
2025 Yamaha R3

In 2024, Yamaha unveiled the 2025 Yamaha YZF-R3. This included a brand new fairing design with integrated winglets for aerodynamics, an Assist and Slipper clutch and further electronic updates to the bikes LCD instrumentation. The bike carried on the same engine from its predecessors.

For 2025, the Yamaha R3 was made to be EURO 5+ compliant. The bike also received a slipper clutch and a new headlight design reminiscent of the Yamaha YZF-R7 and the 2024 Yamaha YZF-R9.

== Performance ==
The 2015 R3 has a braking distance of 40 meters from 100-0 kph. According to some reviewers, the braking system is not powerful enough to match the engine power and that, without ABS, the R3 is also prone to fishtailing under hard braking.

The R3 has also proved to be a competent race bike, scoring two WSSP300 Championship titles in 2017 and 2022 by Marc García and Álvaro Diaz respectively. In 2023, the bike saw multiple victories under the hands of Matteo Vannucci and Mirko Gennai.

The bike has a 0-60 mph time of 5.1 seconds. 0-100 mph takes 19.82 seconds.

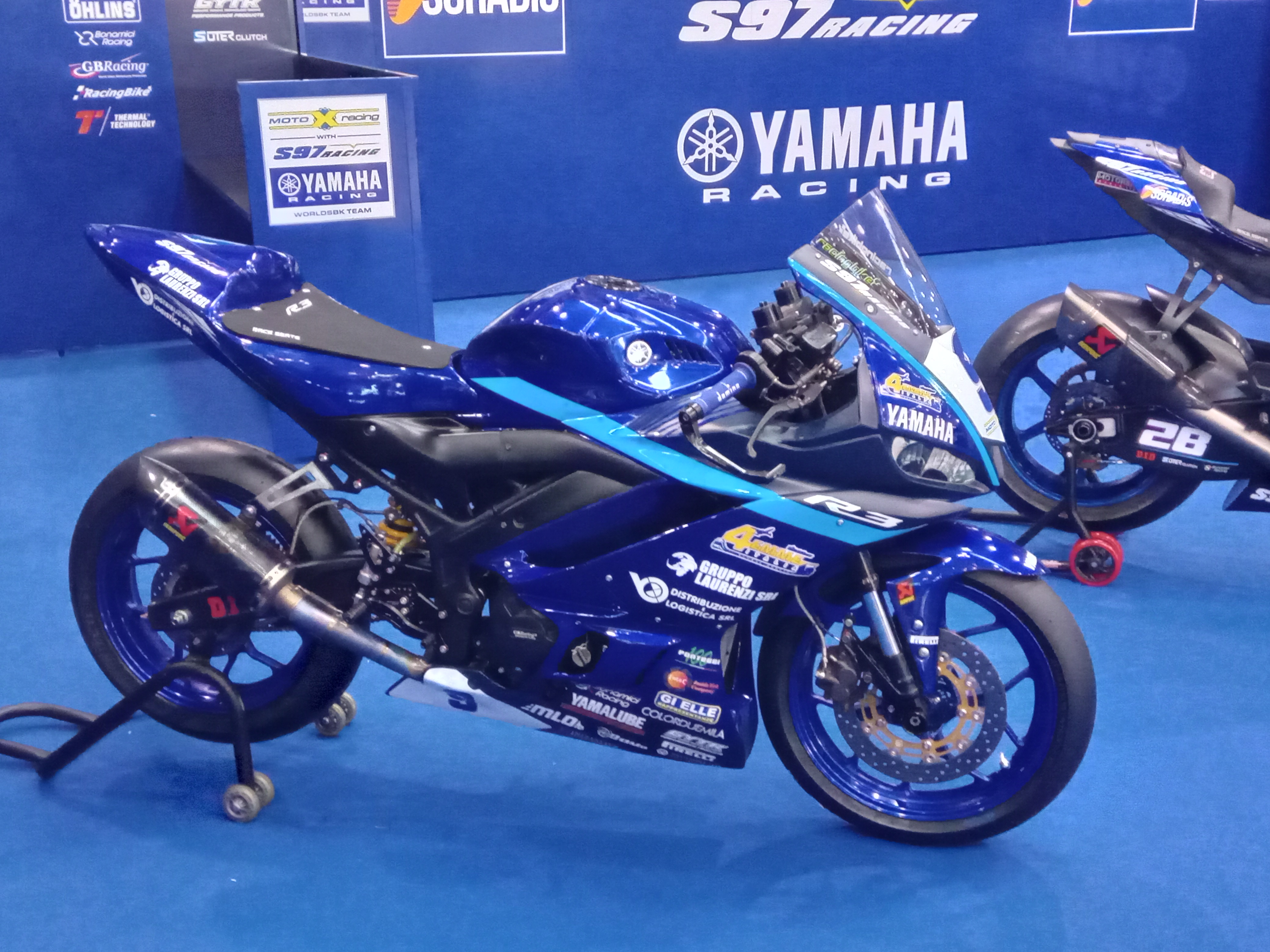
Yamaha R3 GYTR

Yamaha Racing Division offer GYTR parts for the 2019 Yamaha R3.
