= Semi-Permanent =

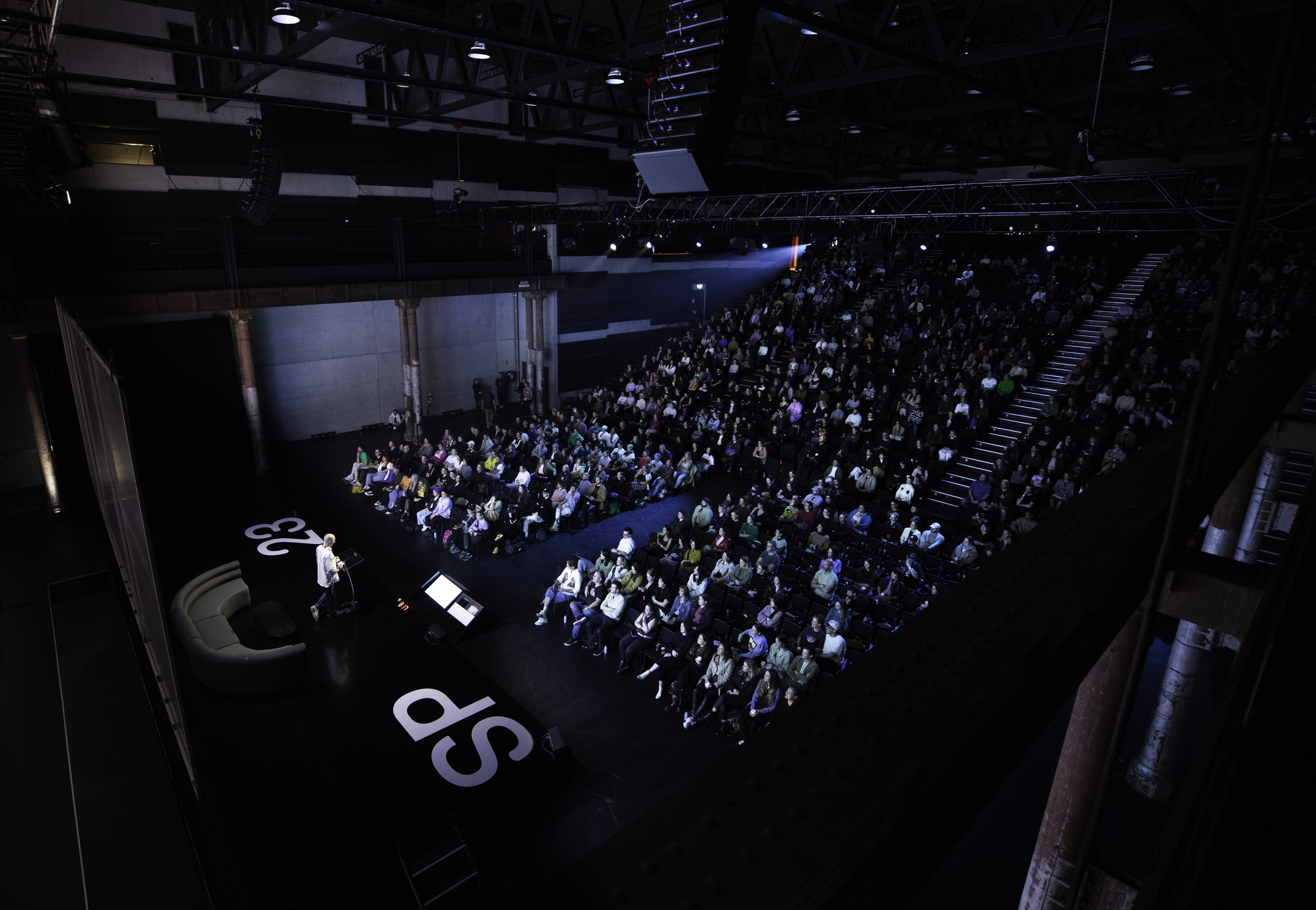
- Semi Permanent Sydney, 2023
- Genre: Design Festival
- Frequency: Annually
- Years active: 1 January 2003 – present
- Founder: Murray Bell and Andrew Johnstone
- Website: semipermanent.com

Semi Permanent is an international annual design festival and a company that hosts events throughout Australia, New Zealand, the United States, United Kingdom and China.

The first Semi Permanent event was hosted in Sydney, Australia in 2003. Previous festival line-ups have included presentations from Francesco Zizola, Brian Roettinger, Numskull, and others. Some of the past event attendees included Industrial Light & Magic, Ed Templeton, Wieden+Kennedy, Shepard Fairey, Jeffrey Deitch, Paula Scher, Oliver Stone, Radiohead and Paul Pope.

Since 2013 Semi Permanent has been part of the Vivid Ideas calendar. In 2020 Semi Permanent announced their partnership with digital publisher Highsnobiety.

Additionally, Semi Permanent is a creative experience company that provides creative and production services via SP Studio and SP Productions. Semi Permanent produces creative experiences for clients including Google, Dropbox and National Geographic.

== Background ==
Founded in 2002 in Australia by Murray Bell and Andrew Johnstone, Semi Permanent encompasses three businesses: Semi Permanent, SP Brand Studio and SP Productions.

Semi Permanent brand includes a global design festival, annual book, and website. Semi Permanent have been running creativity festivals since 2003 in cities across the globe, including Sydney, Auckland, Singapore, Abu Dhabi, London, New York, Los Angeles, Hong Kong and Portugal. Past speakers and collaborators include filmmakers Oliver Stone, Michel Gondry, and the Coppola family; artists Tom Sachs, CJ Hendry and Alex Israel; and creatives including Nike's Tinker Hatfield, Pentagram's Paula Scher, pro skater Tony Hawk, architect Bjarke Ingels and others. Previous festivals have included the collaborations with Google Tilt Brush and National Geographic. Previous festival themes include "Truth" in 2019, and "Restless" in 2020.

Semi Permanent publishes an annual book, featuring interviews with creative thought leaders. Previously featured interviews included Alicia Keys, Cara Stricker, Takashi Murakami, Nadia Lee Cohen, and Kevin Parker.

SP Brand Studio co-created a two-day live sport and creativity experience in 2021, and created an immersive retrospective with Stanley Donwood and Radiohead with sound design by Thom Yorke.

SP Productions is an events and production agency. They worked with Google to curate and produce their global diversity and inclusion program, Rare.

The Semi Permanent office is located in Sydney, Australia.

== Past speakers and collaborators ==
- Radiohead
- Roman Coppola
- Alicia Keys
- Namila Benson
- Jeffrey Deitch
- Kevin Parker, Tame Impala
- Takashi Murakami
- Olivier Zahm (Purple)
- Michael Leon
- Nicholas Felton
- Kelly Slater
- Gia Coppola
- Carl Lewis
- Oliver Stone
- Chris Burkard
- Shaun White
- Carli Lloyd
- Perks and Mini|PAM
- Willo Perron
- Vince Frost
- Platon
- Danny Yount
- Scott Dadich (Wired)
- United Visual Artists
- Wieden+Kennedy
- Jonathan Zawada
- Cory Arnold
- The Monkeys advertising (The Monkeys)
- Industrial Light & Magic
- Banksy
- Seb Lester
- The Talks website (The Talks)
- Fafi
- Michael Muller
- Jill Greenberg
- Ron English
- Droga 5
- Kris Moyes
- Nabil
- Paul Pope
- Floria Sigismondi
- WETA Digital
- Taj Burrow
- Shepard Fairey
- March Studio
- AKQA
- R/GA
- Tara McPherson
- Moving Picture Company (MPC)
- Aaron Rose
- Ed Templeton
- Reg Mombassa
- Pixar
- Stefan Sagmeister
