= Blank page (disambiguation) =

Blank page may refer to:

- An intentionally blank page in printing
- about:blank

== Art ==
- The Blank Page, a 1967 painting by René Magritte

== Books ==
- The Blank Page, a 1974 crime novel by K.C. Constantine

== Film and TV ==
- "The Blank Page", an episode of Strangers with Candy
- Blank Page (2021 film)

== Music ==
=== Bands ===
- "Blank Page" - an American country duo composed of Jack Robert and Avery Grace.

=== Songs ===
- "Blank Page", a 2012 song by Christina Aguilera
- "Blank Page", a song by The Smashing Pumpkins from their 1998 album Adore
- "White Blank Page", a song by Mumford and Sons from their 2009 album Sigh No More
- "Blank Pages" (Patricia Conroy song), a 1992 song

== See also ==
- Emptiness (disambiguation)
