= Neo Sans =

Geometric sans-serif typeface

Neo Sans and Neo Tech are the typefaces designed by the British type designer Sebastian "Seb" Lester. The typefaces were released by Monotype Corporation on 19 April 2004. The design concept called for a versatile, futuristic typeface that didn't look "crude, gimmicky or ephemeral".

The typeface gained popularity after a custom variant was used as the main typeface for the Vancouver 2010 Olympic and Paralympic Winter Games. It has been used as branding for many organizations since.

== Neo Sans Intel ==
Neo Sans Intel is a customized version of Neo Sans based on the Neo Sans and Neo Tech, designed by Sebastian Lester in 2004. It was replaced by Intel Clear in 2014, a typeface commissioned by Intel to Red Peek Branding and Dalton Maag, and was in 2020 supplemented with Intel One typeface. Despite no longer being fully used by Intel, Neo Sans is still used to describe the processor type and socket on boxed processor packaging.

== Users ==
- A customized version of Neo Sans, called Neo Sans Intel, was created for use in the 2005 redesigned logo and identity for the Intel Corporation.
- The Canadian media conglomerate Astral Media used this font for their logo from 2010 to 2013, albeit modified.
- The British Army Cadet Force (ACF) use Neo Sans as their primary font.
- The Labour Party UK previously used the typeface in its branding, before it was replaced by Open Sans.
- Virgin Rail Group used Neo Sans in its branding.
- Gojek used Neo Sans in its branding until 2019.
- Kia Motors used Neo Sans for its branding until it adopted another typeface.
- Valve used Neo Sans for the 2010 freeware game Alien Swarm.
- Veikkaus, Finland’s national lottery operator, uses Neo Sans.
- The ITV network (including ITV1 in England and Wales) breakfast show Daybreak and Lorraine used this font in its onscreen graphics before the 2012 rebrand. The font stopped being used in 2023.
- Go North East and Go South Coast (British public transport companies) use the font in their promotional leaflets and informative posters.
- Neo Sans itself, as well as its unicase and rounded variant, were used as the official typeface by Vancouver Organizing Committee for the 2010 Olympic and Paralympic Winter Games.
- The popular British teen drama Skins, uses this font as its logo.
- NRK, the Norwegian national broadcaster, used Neo Sans Pro as its main font on television until 2013, when it was replaced by the LFT Etica typeface and a slab version customised for NRK.
- The Technical University of Denmark use Neo Sans as its main sans serif font, for logotypes, headers and shorter texts.
- UK student radio station Pure FM uses Neo Sans in its logo.
- The Melbourne train operator Metro Trains Melbourne, uses the font in their branding and advertising.
- Oxford Bus Company uses the typeface heavily for the logo and other text.
- The online television archive TVARK uses the font in its logo.
- National Express West Midlands uses Neo Sans for its updated branding and logo.
- Rede Telecine used Neo Sans on its branding from 2010 until 2019.
