= Danielle Foote =

Danielle Foote (born 8 June 1987 in Adelaide) is an Australian former reality series star and business person. She appeared on Big Brother Australia 2006 and lived in Sydney. Her debut single, a cover of Underworld's "Underneath the Radar", was released on 7 August 2006. It debuted at No. 52 on the ARIA singles chart, and peaked at No. 41. In January 2015, Foote married Hayden Cox, an Australian surfer and board designer. From 2014, Foote has worked with Cox in his board design business in El Segundo, California.

== Discography ==
=== Singles ===
List of singles, with selected chart positions
Title	Year	Peak chart positions
Title	Year	AUS
"Underneath the Radar"	2006	41
