= Haydenshapes Surfboards =

Australian surfboard company

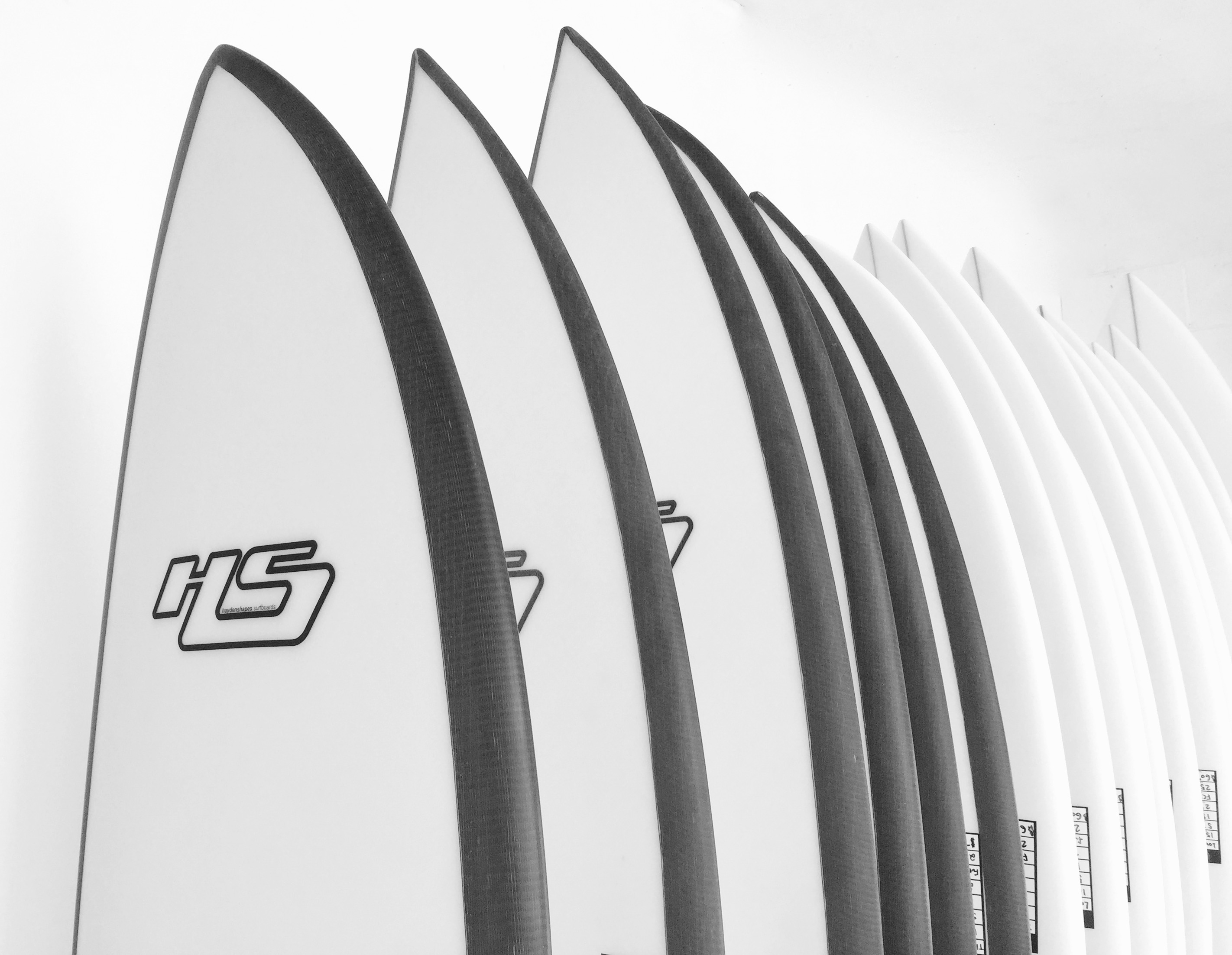
- Type: Private company
- Industry: Sporting goods
- Founded: 1996 in Sydney, Australia
- Founder: Hayden Cox
- Headquarters: Sydney, Australia
- Area served: Worldwide
- Products: Surfboards
- Website: www.haydenshapes.com

Haydenshapes Surfboards is an Australian-based performance surfboard brand founded by Hayden Cox in 1996. Haydenshapes' most notable design is the Hypto Krypto model. The brand is known for their use of parabolic carbon fibre frame surfboard technology FutureFlex. The Haydenshapes has a team of professional athletes that includes free surfer Craig Anderson (Quiksilver) and surfer Creed Mctaggart (Billabong).

== History ==
Haydenshapes Surfboards was founded in 1996 by Hayden Cox in Sydney, Australia. At the time of establishment, Hayden was 15 and in high school. After snapping his favourite surfboard and not being able to afford a new one, he decided to make one of his own instead. In 2006, Haydenshapes launched the newly invented and patented FutureFlex (formally known as FiberFlex, created by Hayden Cox) a parabolic carbon fiber frame technology, a modern take on the traditional "wooden stringer" surfboard design. In 2011, Haydenshapes signed a global distribution deal that launched the brand globally into 70 countries. In 2013, Haydenshapes opened a US manufacturing facility and office in El Segundo, California. Haydenshapes currently manufactures surfboards in Australia, USA, and Thailand.

== Awards ==
- Haydenshapes Surfboards was awarded Surfboard of the Year two consecutive years (2014 and 2015) for their Hypto Krypto surfboard design.
- Haydenshapes also received praise for style and innovation in the 'Sports and Leisure' category at the Australian Good Design Awards in 2014.
- Haydenshapes voted best Surfboard of 2012 by Stab Magazine for their Raven surfboard design.
- Other awards include news.com.au Entrepreneur of the Year in 2011 and winner of ABC Television's The New Inventors series (episode 26).
