= Blanking =

Blanking may refer to:

- Blanking (metalworking), a metalworking process to form the rough shape of a sheet metal workpiece
- Blanking (video)
  - Horizontal blanking interval
  - Vertical blanking interval

== See also ==
- Blank (disambiguation)
