= Martin Blank =

Martin Blank may refer to:

- Martin Blank (artist) (born 1962), American glass artist
- Martin Blank (politician) (1897–1972), German politician
- Martin Blank (playwright), American playwright, screenwriter, and theatrical producer
- Martin Blank (Grosse Pointe Blank), lead character in the film Grosse Pointe Blank
- Martin Blank (Marvel Comics), the alter ego of the Marvel Comics character known as Gibbon
