= Empty space =

Empty space may refer to:

== Physics ==
- Outer space, especially the relatively empty regions of the universe outside the atmospheres of celestial bodies
- Vacuum, a volume of space that is essentially empty of matter, such that its gaseous pressure is much less than atmospheric pressure
- Free space, a perfect vacuum as expressed in the classical physics model
- Vacuum state, a perfect vacuum based on the quantum mechanical model
- In mathematical physics, the homogeneous equation may correspond to a physical theory formulated in empty space
- Void, empty space.

== Arts and literature ==
- Empty Space (novel), a novel by M. John Harrison
- The Empty Space, a 1968 book by the British director Peter Brook
- Empty Space Peter Brook Award, an annual prize awarded to a British theatre

== Music ==
=== Albums ===
- Empty Space (album), a 2003 album by Lycia
- Empty Space, a 2011 album by Buckethead

=== Songs ===
- "Empty Space" (song), a 2018 song by James Arthur
- "Empty Space", a 2002 song by Lifehouse from Stanley Climbfall
- "Empty Space", a 2007 song by Air Traffic from Fractured Life
- "Empty Space", a 2013 song by The Story So Far from What You Don't See
- "Empty Spaces", a 1989 song by Spandau Ballet from Heart Like a Sky

== See also ==
- Empty (disambiguation)
- Space (disambiguation)
- Void (disambiguation)
- Negative space, in typography
