= Yamaha MT series =

Motorbike family

The Yamaha MT series is a family of standard/naked bikes manufactured by Yamaha since 2005. The name "MT" stands for "Master of Torque".

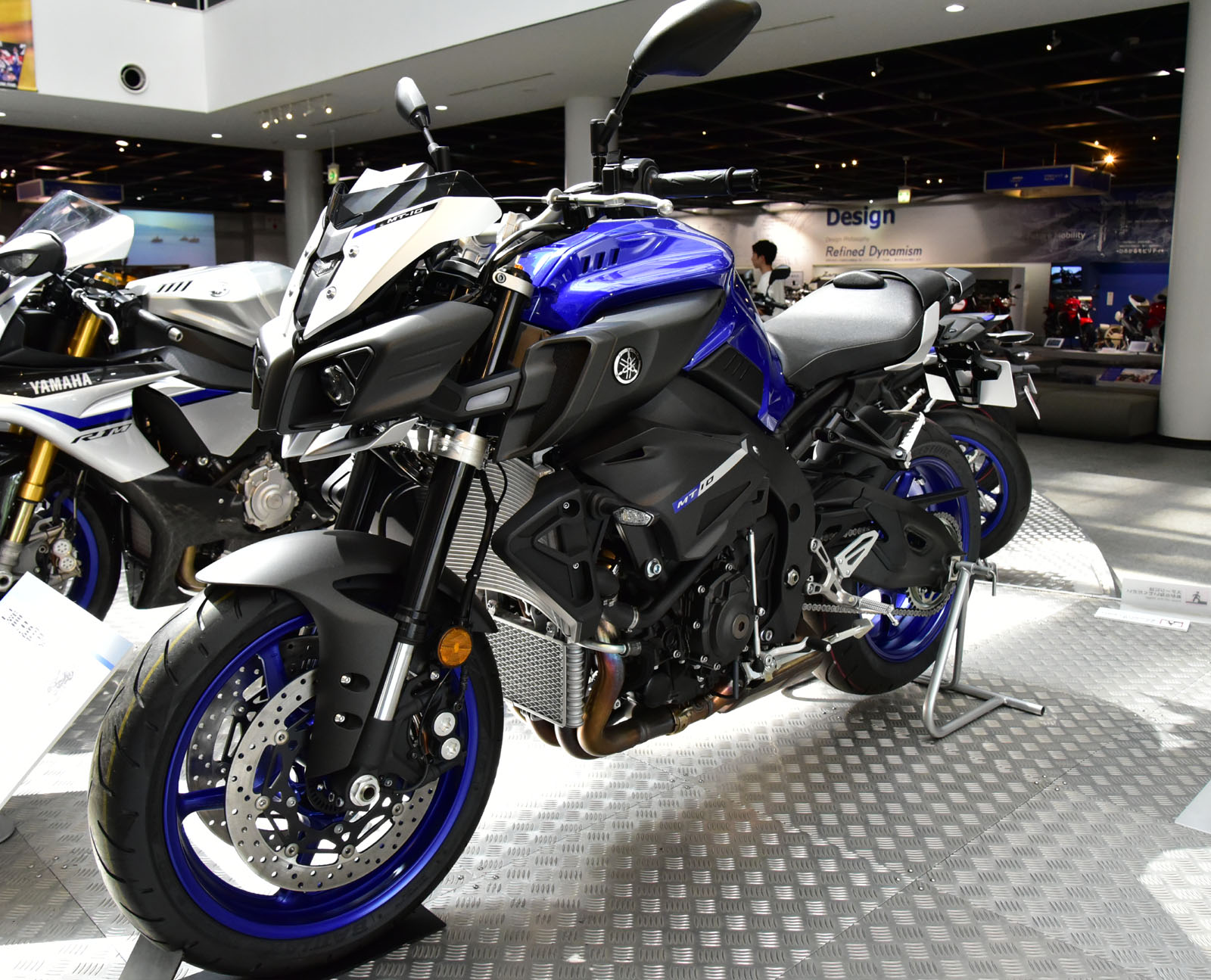
2016 Yamaha MT-10

== Single-cylinder ==
- MT-125 (2014–present)
- MT-15 (2018–present)
- MT-03 (2006–2014)

== Parallel-twin ==
- MT-25 (2015–present)
- MT-03 (2016–present)
- MT-07 (2014–present)

== Inline-three ==
- MT-09 (2014–present)

== Inline-four ==
- MT-10 (2016–present)

== V-twin ==
- MT-01 (2005–2012)
