= Emptiness (disambiguation) =

Emptiness is the state of being empty, i.e., not containing anything.

Emptiness or The Emptiness may also refer to:

== Mathematics and science ==
- Empty set, a set that contains no elements
- Empty string, string of length zero
- Vacuum, lack of matter

== Media, arts and entertainment ==
- Emptiness (film), a 2020 film
- The Emptiness (album), a 2010 album released by post-hardcore band Alesana

=== Songs ===
- "Emptiness", a song by electronic music artist Slushii
- "Emptiness", a song by Taiwanese singer Jolin Tsai for the 1999 studio album 1019
- "Emptiness", a song by The Caretaker from his 2001 album A stairway to the stars

== Other uses ==
- Emptiness (Chinese constellation), a Chinese star constellation
- Śūnyatā, a concept in Buddhist philosophy often translated as "emptiness"

== See also ==
- Empty (disambiguation)
