= Seb Lester =

English artist

Sebastian "Seb" Lester (born 1972 in London) is an English artist, type designer and calligrapher. Lester is notable for prominent type designs and calligraphic prints. He is also known for his videos of hand drawn calligraphy, often of famous brands, published on social media.

Lester is notable for his 2009–2010 redesigns for Penguin imprint Hamish Hamilton of four covers of J. D. Salinger books, including The Catcher in the Rye and Franny and Zooey. Lester is notable for his design of the official font, Neo Sans, of the 2010 Vancouver Winter Olympics. A customized version of Neo is also used by Intel. Lester also helped develop the mastheads for The Daily Telegraph and The Sunday Telegraph in the UK and the Waitrose corporate typeface. Lester designed the September 28, 2009 cover of Business Week. In 2014 it was reported he had been commissioned by NASA to design the logo for the Surface Water and Ocean Topography (SWOT) mission.

In addition to type design, Lester is famous for his prints, many of which are characterized by words built up of rich, dense calligraphic strokes and flourishes. Lester's design process is recorded in a February 11, 2010 Creative Review blog article and can also be seen in his short videos.

He can be considered to be best known by the wider public for viral videos of him hand-drawing well known logos. These have been widely reported in publications such as Huffington Post, the UK Daily Mirror, Fast Company and Buzzfeed. As of mid-June 2015 Seb Lester had nearly 1 Million followers across his social media accounts where he publishes videos of him performing his calligraphy. In March 2016, his work makes the cover of the 33rd issue of Very Nearly Almost where he talks about the effects of the digital media presence in his career and creative process. In June 2015 he was also featured in a BBC video report, where he was referred to as the "Banksy of calligraphy".

Lester studied graphic design at Central Saint Martins in London, graduating in 1997, and started designing typefaces for Monotype in the early 21st Century. He lives and works in East Sussex, England.

== Typefaces ==
- Zoroaster, for T.26 Foundry
- Cuban, for T.26 Foundry
- Equipoize, for T.26 Foundry
- Neo Sans and Neo Tech, for Monotype Imaging
- Scene, released in 2002 by Monotype Imaging
- Soho, for Monotype Imaging
