= Monica Blank =

American electrical engineer

Monica Blank is an American electrical engineer whose research focuses on gyrotrons and their use in generating millimeter-wave radiation for applications including radar and nuclear magnetic resonance. She works for Communications & Power Industries (formerly part of Varian, Inc.) in the San Francisco Bay Area.

== Education and career ==
Blank majored in electrical engineering at the Catholic University of America in Washington, D.C., graduating in 1988. She went to the Massachusetts Institute of Technology for graduate study in electrical engineering, earned a master's degree in 1991, and completed her Ph.D. in 1994.

From 1994 to 1999 she worked at the Naval Research Laboratory in its Vacuum Electronics Branch. She moved to Varian in 1999. In 2021, she became chair of the Vacuum Electronics Technical Committee of the IEEE Electron Devices Society.

== Recognition ==
Blank has been a distinguished lecturer of the IEEE Nuclear & Plasma Sciences Society. She was named an IEEE Fellow, in the 2020 class of fellows, "for development of gyrotron oscillators and amplifiers".

She was the recipient of the IEEE 2020 Plasma Science and Applications Award, given at the 2020 International Conference on Plasma Sciences, "for outstanding technical contributions to the development of high-power, high-frequency gyrotron amplifier and oscillator sources for spectroscopy, radar, fusion, and industrial applications".
