= Jonah Blank =

American author and journalist

Jonah Blank is an American author, journalist and foreign policy expert, specializing in the culture, history and affairs of the Indian subcontinent.

== Writing career ==
Blank studied history at Yale University, and worked as the financial editor of the largest English language newspaper of Japan, where he first immersed in an Asian culture. He later completed graduate studies in anthropology at Harvard (where he won the David L. Boren Fellowship, which provided funds for research outside the United States), and wrote his first book, Arrow of the Blue-Skinned God: Retracing the Ramayana through India in the same period.

Blank has traveled extensively across India and Pakistan, and learned the ancient language of Sanskrit, as well as the languages Hindi, Gujarati and Urdu. He has also extensive knowledge and experience of the traditions and teachings of Hinduism, Islam and other religions in Asia.

Blank used the Boren Fellowship to work with the Dawoodi Bohra Muslim community, primarily based in the Indian city of Bombay. He was the first anthropologist to work with this usually conservative community, publishing his work in Mullahs on the Mainframe. In Jonah Blank's important, myth-shattering book, the West gets its first look at the Daudi Bohras, a unique Muslim denomination who have found the core of their religious beliefs largely compatible with modern ideology. Combining orthodox Muslim prayer, dress, and practice with secular education, relative gender equality, and Internet use, this community serves as a surprising reminder that the central values of "modernity" are hardly limited to the west.

== Journalism and in government ==
Blank earned a PhD in 1998 from Harvard University, and joined the staff of U.S. News & World Report, as well as writing for The New Yorker and Foreign Affairs. But Blank decided to leave the magazine to work actively to influence the foreign policy of the U.S. government on Near Eastern affairs, becoming the policy advisor on South Asia/Near East policy to the Senate Committee on Foreign Relations.

He is also a member of the Council on Foreign Relations. He currently works as a Senior Political Scientist at the RAND Corporation.

== Bibliography ==
- Arrow of the Blue-Skinned God: Retracing the Ramayana through India (1990)
- Mullahs on the Mainframe: Islam and Modernity Among The Daudi Bohras (2002)
