= Maquinaria y Elementos de Transporte =

Maquinaria y Elementos de Transporte, also known as Maquitrans or by the abbreviation MT, is a former bus modification and Spanish car manufacturer based in Barcelona.

== History ==
The company was established in the 1940s as a subsidiary of Tranvías de Barcelona. Its main purpose was to adapt old buses for use as trolleybuses to avoid the fuel shortages after the Spanish Civil War. The companys name was shortened to MT. It was located on Luchana Street, Barcelona. In the 1950s it began to manufacture scooters and three wheel motor bikes. Microcar production occurred in 1957.

== Trolley Buses ==
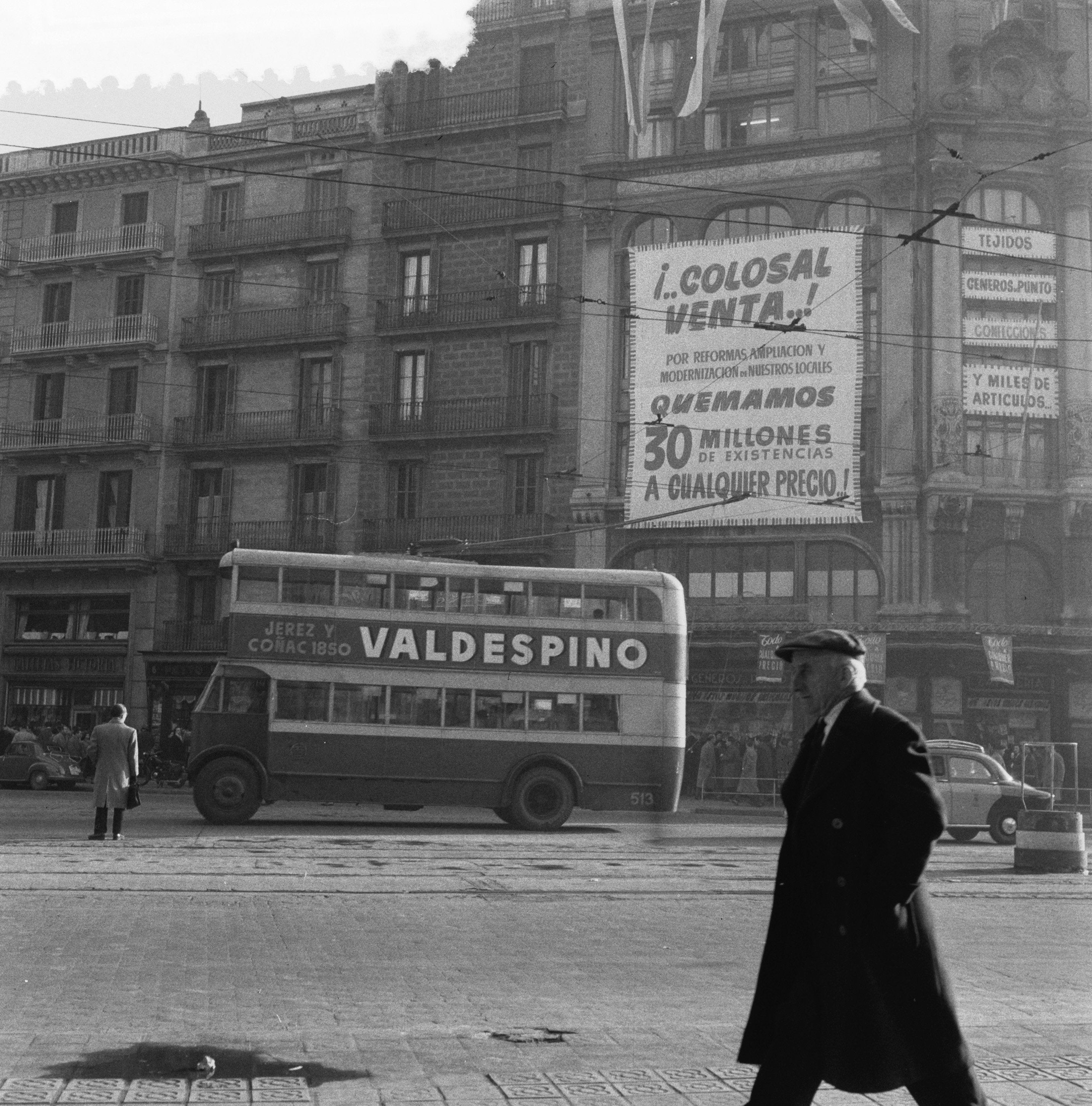
Marquitrans double decker

From 1941 to 1949 Marquitrans made two types of trolley buses, single and double deck models. In total 40 buses were built.

== Motorscooters ==
From 1950 Marquitrans began to focus on motor scooters and three wheel cargo scooters. All were powered by a single cylinder 175 cc 7 hp engine. For the cargo scooters, it was mounted in front of the single rear wheel with a mid-engine design. This engine made it possible to reach maximum speeds close to 70 km/h.

== Microcar ==
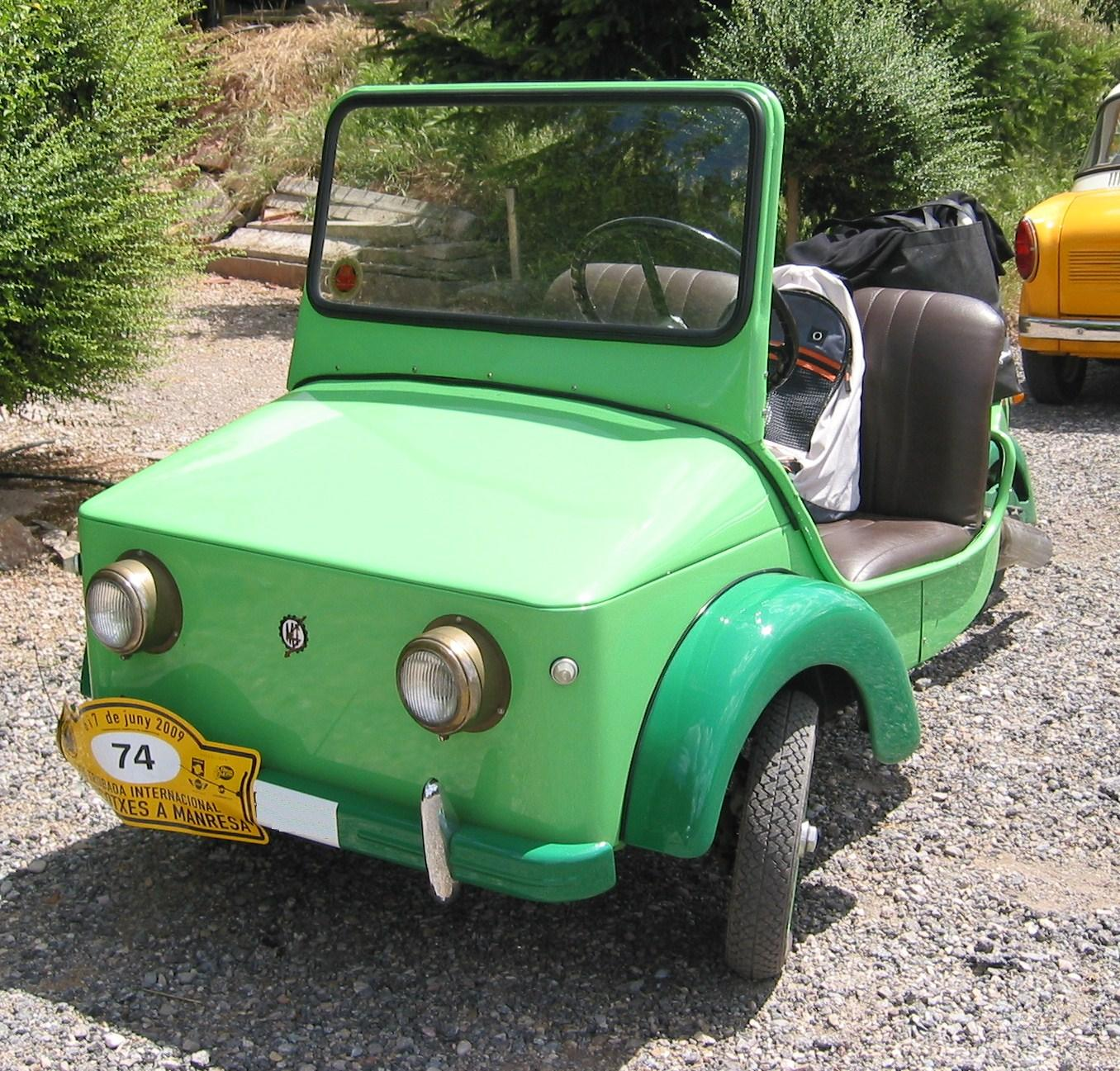
1957 prototype

The microcar was based on the three wheel cargo scooter and had the same chassis, but the handlebars were replaced by a steering wheel. The body was open and provided enough space for two people. The first prototype has been preserved. It was taken as the basis for the definitive model, after adding a complete fairing to the rear of the engine, leaving all the mechanics hidden. About 20 units were made of the final model, of which only the prototype is known to have survived.

== Mototrans ==
In 1958 the company partnered with Cliper, a Barcelona importer of Italian Ducati motorcycles and both formed Mototrans, a company dedicated to the manufacture of Ducati motorcycles. The company survived until 1982.
