= Nicholas Felton (graphic designer) =

American infographic designer

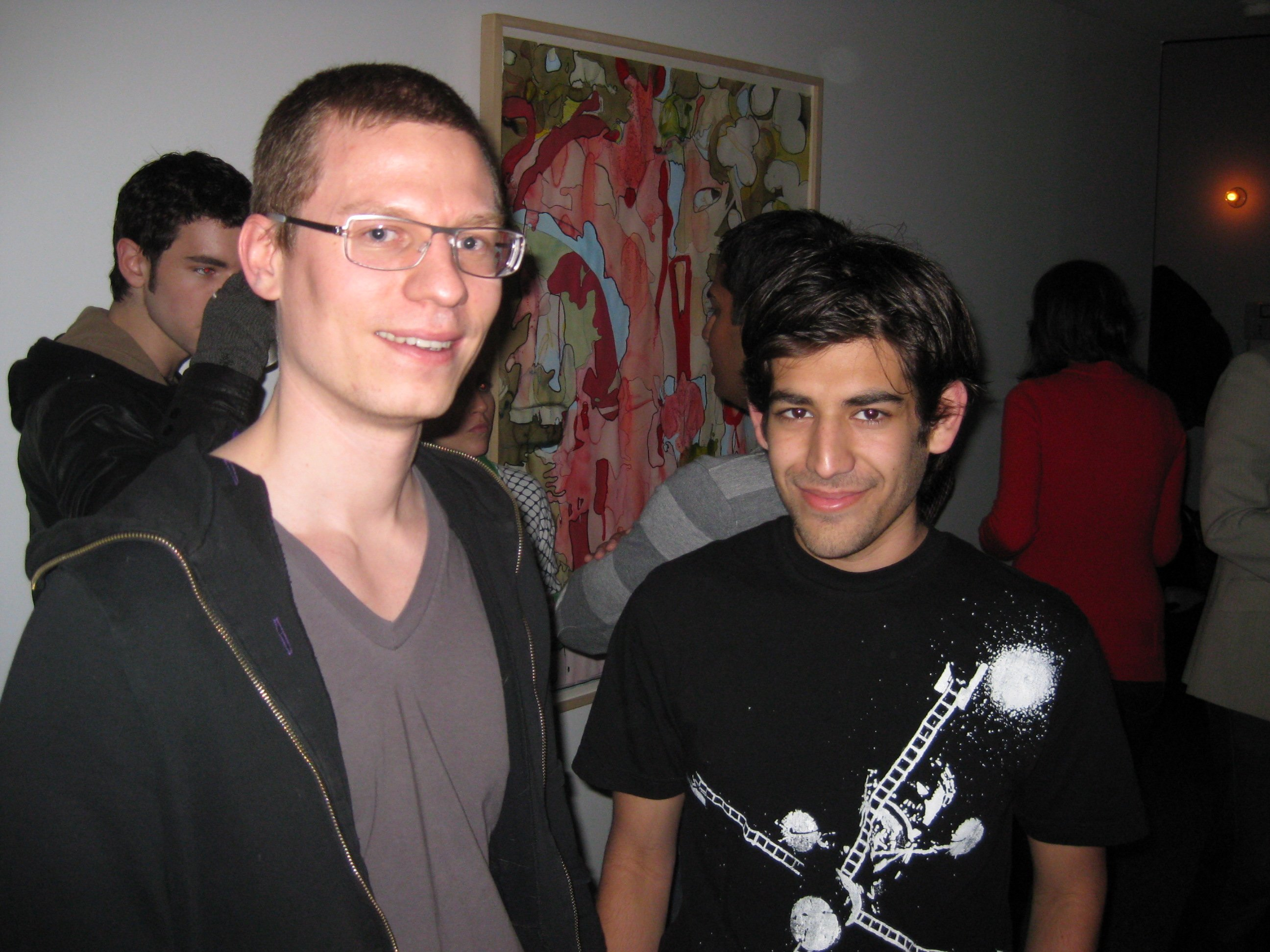
Felton and Aaron Swartz, 2009

Nicholas Felton is an infographic designer. He is the author of Personal Annual Reports that weave measurements into a tapestry of graphs, maps and statistics to reflect the year's activities. He is the co-founder of Daytum.com, and was a member of the product design team at Facebook. His work has been profiled in publications including the New York Times, Wall Street Journal, Wired and Good Magazine and has been recognized as one of the 50 most influential designers in America by Fast Company. He is credited for influencing the design of Facebook's timeline. Nicholas is currently a Human Interface designer at Apple.

== Work ==
His work focuses on "translating quotidian data into meaningful objects and experiences". His most famous art project is the Feltron Project (personal annual reports starting in 2005 until 2014), where he registers the minutiae of his life, including data regarding the places he visited, the music he listened to, and his everyday activities in general (gathered from his own memory, calendar, photos, and Last.fm data) and transforms it into a series of artistic charts. His purpose is not only analytical but also aesthetic, playing between the realms of self-quantification, design and art.

In the same vein he created in 2009 Daytum together with Ryan Case, an app destined to track personalized every-day data, which could be shared between friends. Even though it was very popular, it had some issues regarding design, so its reception was not completely positive. They are also responsible for the creation of Facebook's timeline, which was a challenge due to the impossibility to predict the user's content. That is why their design focused on being flexible enough to allow for a wide variety of content.

Felton's most recent work is the app Reporter, which via short surveys gathers data about the user and tries to "illuminate aspects of your life that might be otherwise unmeasurable".

Even though it might seem that Felton's main concern is self-quantification, he no longer quantifies his own life. After the 2014 edition, he paused his Annual Reports, stating that: "The world of personal data has changed considerably since the project began in 2005 and this edition [2014 edition] attempts to capture its current state". Regarding this last edition, he commented that: "While previous editions have relied on custom solutions to gather ethereal personal data, this edition is based entirely on commercially available applications and devices". As a consequence, he no longer gathered data manually, which generated a problem of context: devices cannot connect raw data in order to tell a story. Nonetheless Felton is confident that data extracted from these devices, if put into relation, can lead us to modify our habits to live a happier and healthier life.

He is now focused on exploring new ways to present the data rather than in the gathering itself, especially through the use of photography, as we can see in his book Photoviz: Visualizing Information through Photography. According to Felton, data is one of the main sources of information for contemporary designers: "It's one of the greatest opportunities designers have ever had to tell stories visually. It's the most exciting time to be a designer or visual artist, and it's data-driven."
