= Yamaha MT-01 =

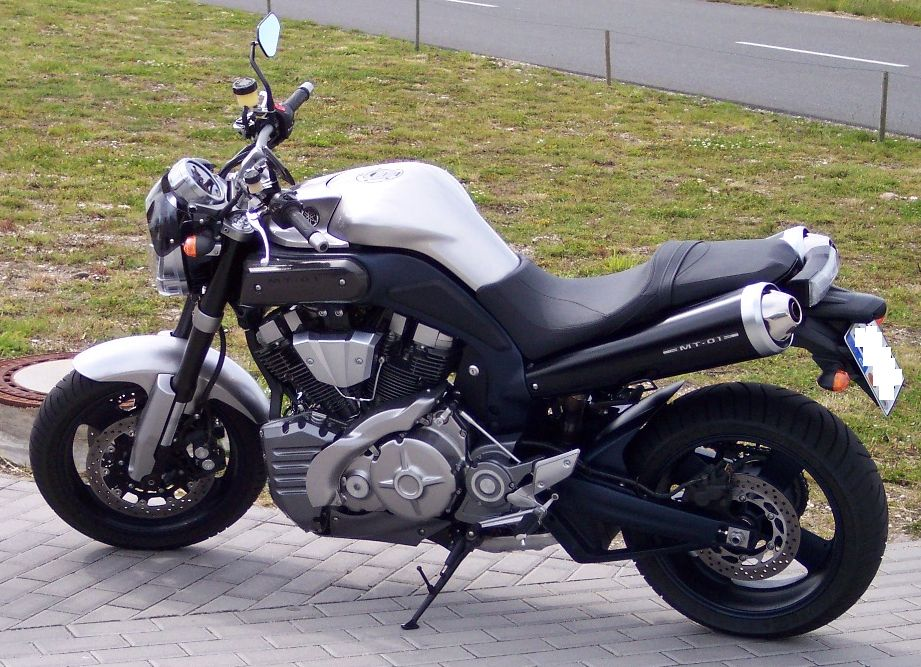
- Manufacturer: Yamaha
- Production: 2005–2012
- Class: Muscle bike
- Engine: 1,670 cc (102 cu in) air-cooled, 4-stroke, 4-valve OHV V-twin
- Bore / stroke: 97.0 mm × 113.0 mm (3.82 in × 4.45 in)
- Compression ratio: 8.36:1
- Top speed: 210 km/h (130 mph)
- Power: 66.3 kW (88.9 hp) @ 4,750 rpm
- Torque: 150.3 N⋅m (110.9 lb⋅ft) @ 3,750 rpm
- Transmission: 5-speed, wet clutch, chain drive
- Suspension: Front: Telescopic forks Rear: Swingarm (link suspension)
- Brakes: Front: dual 310 mm disc Rear: single 267 mm disc
- Tires: Front: 120/70 ZR17 M/C (58W); Rear: 190/50 ZR17 M/C (73W)
- Rake, trail: 25° / 103 mm (4.1 in)
- Wheelbase: 1,525 mm (60.0 in)
- Dimensions: L: 2,185 mm (86.0 in); W: 800 mm (31 in); H: 1,105 mm (43.5 in)
- Seat height: 825 mm (32.5 in)
- Weight: 245 kg (540 lb) (dry); 265 kg (584 lb) (wet)
- Fuel capacity: 15 L (3.3 imp gal; 4.0 US gal)
- Oil capacity: 5 L (5.3 US qt)

The Yamaha MT-01 is a MT series motorcycle made by Yamaha from 2005 to 2012, available in Australia, New Zealand, Europe, India, Japan and parts of North America. But Yamaha Motor Corp. USA declined to import it to the United States, citing a small market for this style of motorcycle. It has unconventional features with a cruiser-style 1,670 cc (102 cu in) air-cooled, overhead valve V-twin engine but a sportbike or naked bike style frame and suspension. The engine is derived from the Yamaha Warrior XV1700 and modified to suit application in the MT-01, while the forks and brakes are derived from the 2004 to 2005 Yamaha R1.

Originally unveiled as a concept motorcycle at the 1999 Tokyo Motor Show, strong public interest in the machine led Yamaha to develop a production model, which was released in 2005. The Motorcycle Design Association (MDA) awarded the MT-01 the Open Category award at the 2004 annual Motorcycle Design Awards at INTERMOT. During its production, the MT-01 remained largely unchanged.

Yamaha offered three different tuning kits developed with Akrapovič (named Stage 1, 2, and 3) for the MT-01, which provide performance increases from standard at each stage.

- Stage 1: Two Akrapovič mufflers, heat shields, and solo seat kit, street-legal.
- Stage 2: Full Akrapovič exhaust system, heat shields, solo seat kit, and Stage 2 high performance ECU, track-use only.
- Stage 3: As above, and a velocity stack kit, valve spring set, stronger diaphragm clutch spring, gasket kit, high compression piston kit, high performance camshaft, and high performance ECU, track-use only.

Mick Withers set the 'Sports Compact' group 5 Australian record for a twin-cylinder motorcycle on a Stage 3 Yamaha MT-01 at a time of 11.77 seconds for a standing quarter mile pass @ 113.57 mph (182.77 km/h) at Compak Attak, Western Sydney International Dragway on 18 May 2008.

For the 2009 model year, Yamaha released a SP (special production) version of the MT-01, upgraded with Öhlins suspension, Pirelli Diablo Rosso tires and a specific color scheme of red and white paint with a black and red seat.

== Gallery ==
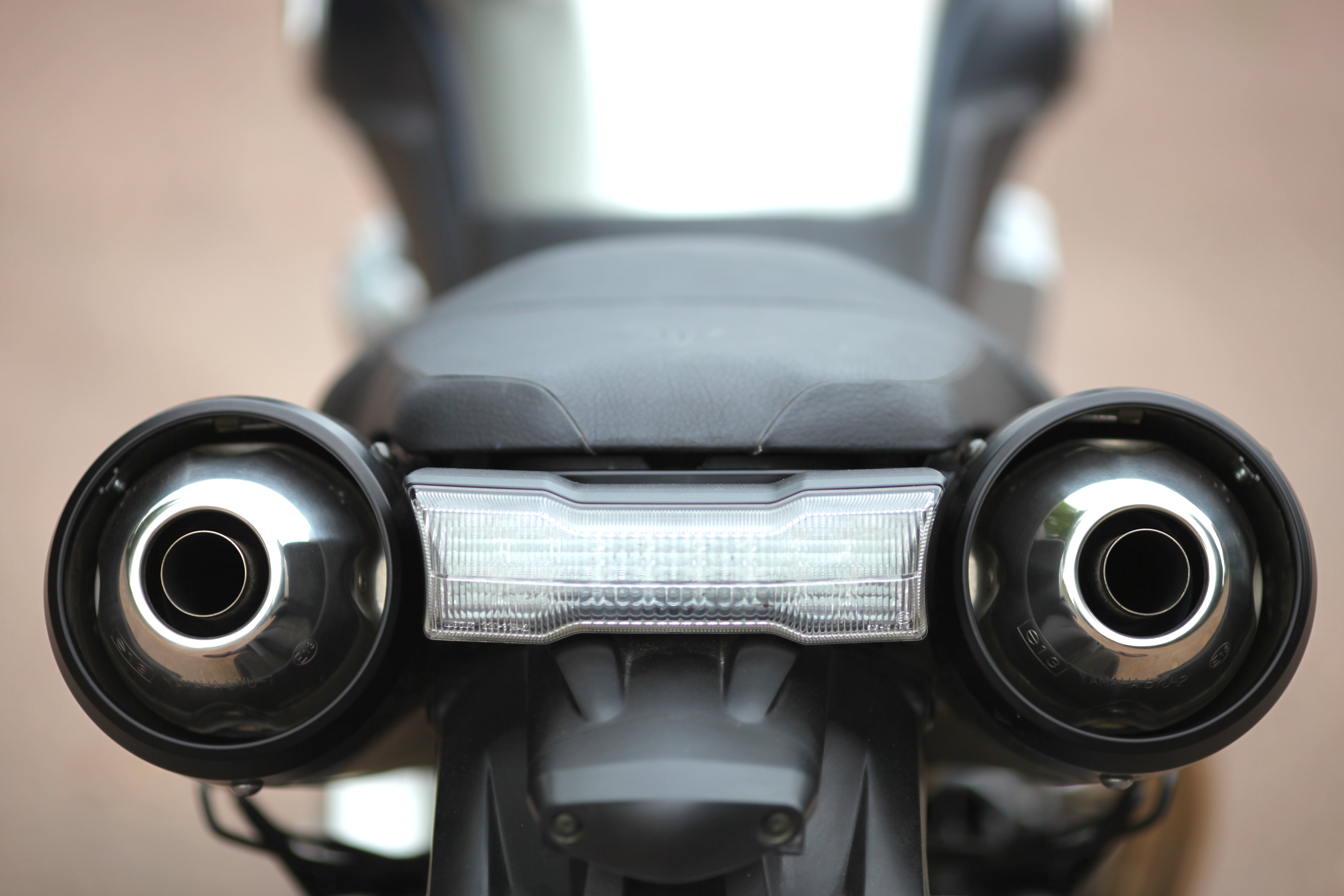
Yamaha MT-01 - 2006 model - rear view

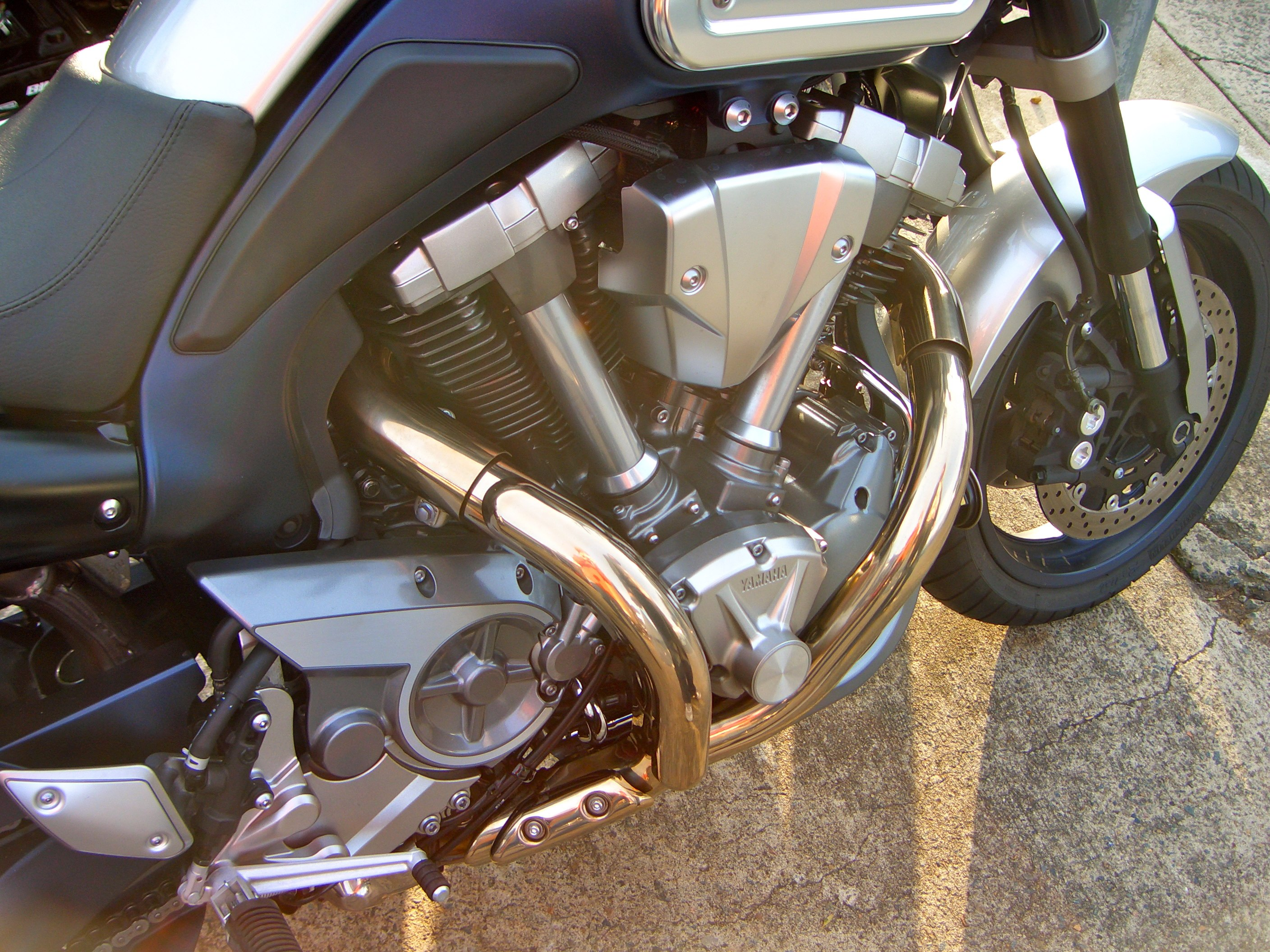
Closeup of MT-01 engine

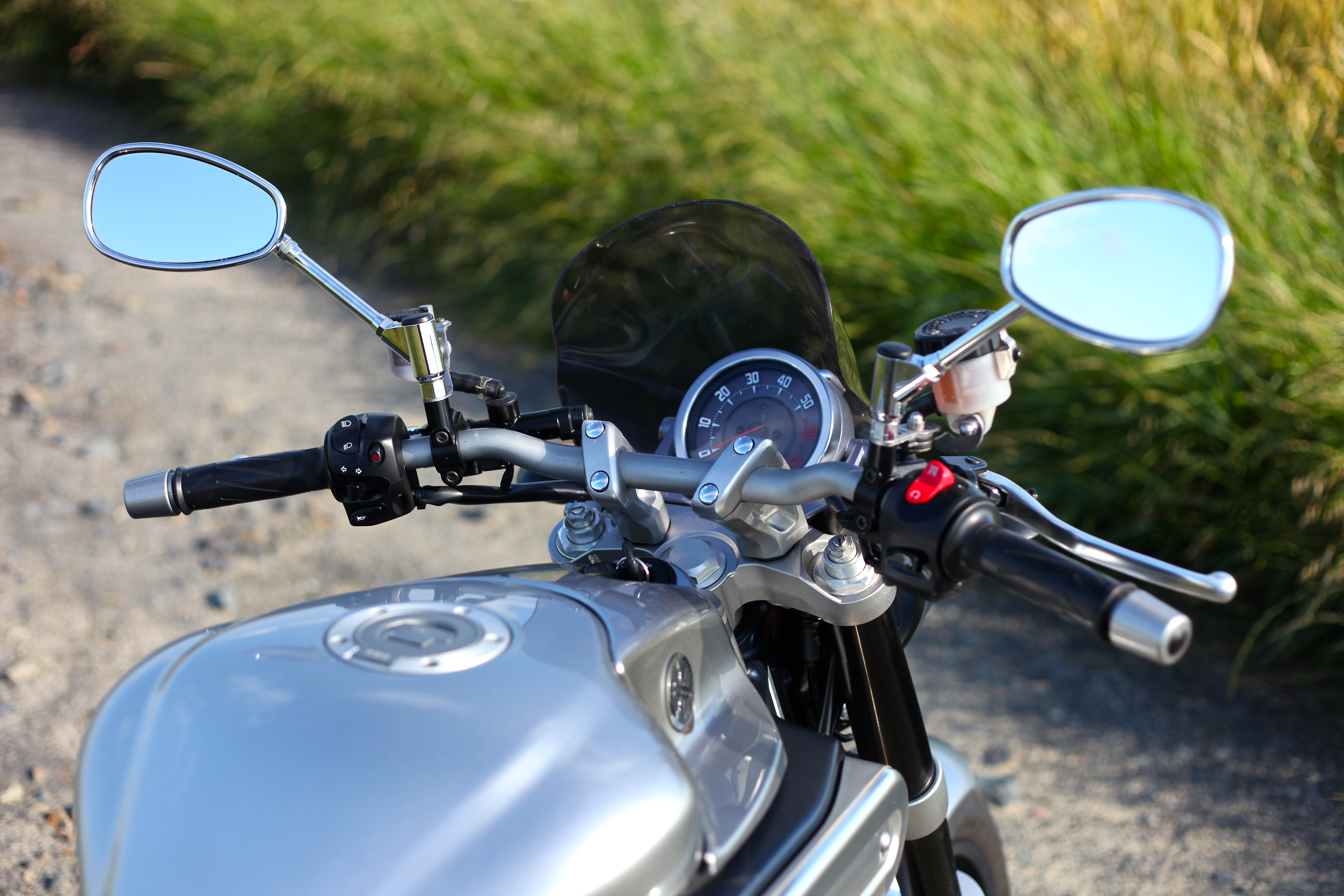
Yamaha MT-01 - 2006 model - handlebar view

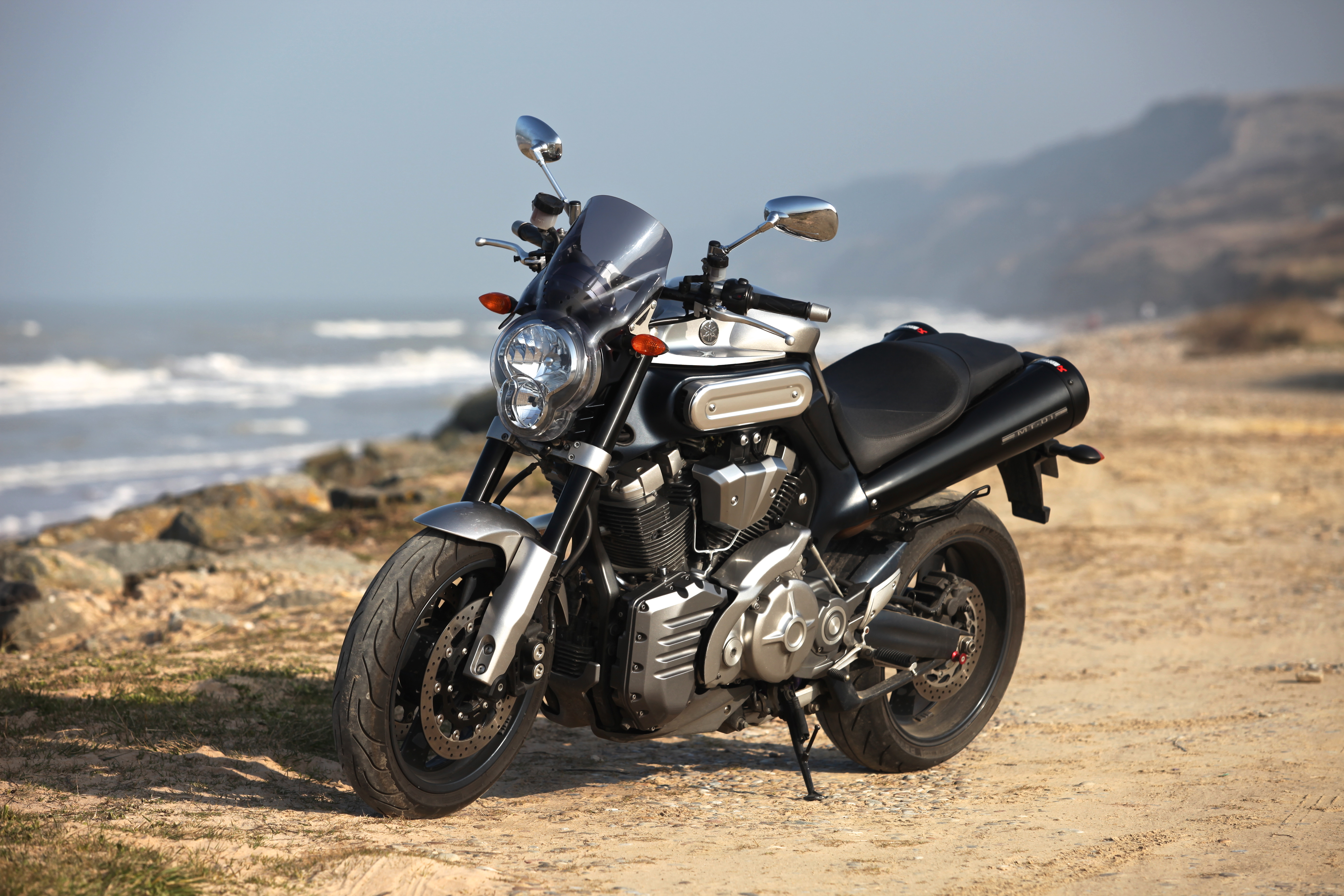
Yamaha MT-01 - 2006 model - front Left

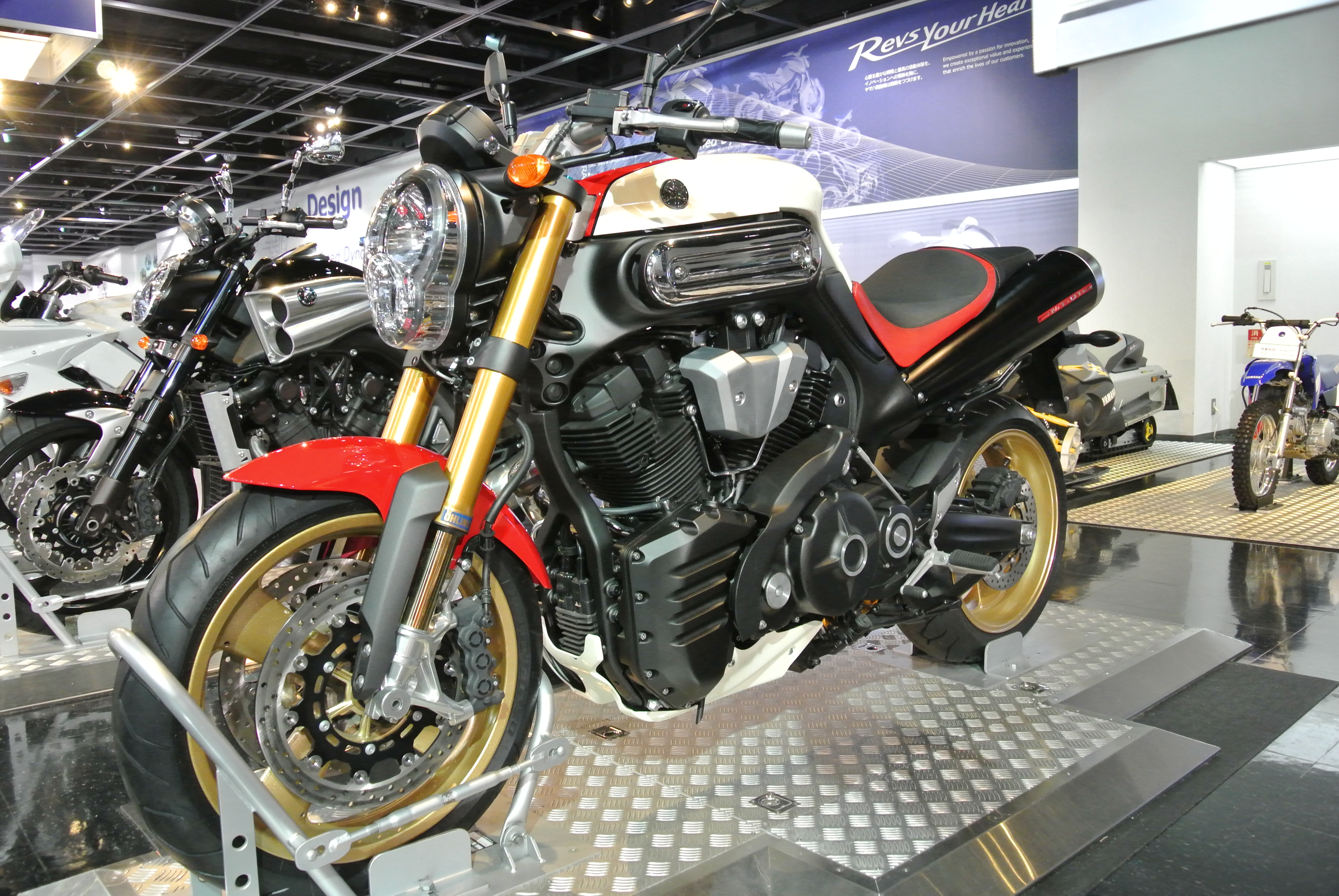
Yamaha MT-01 SP special limited-edition version

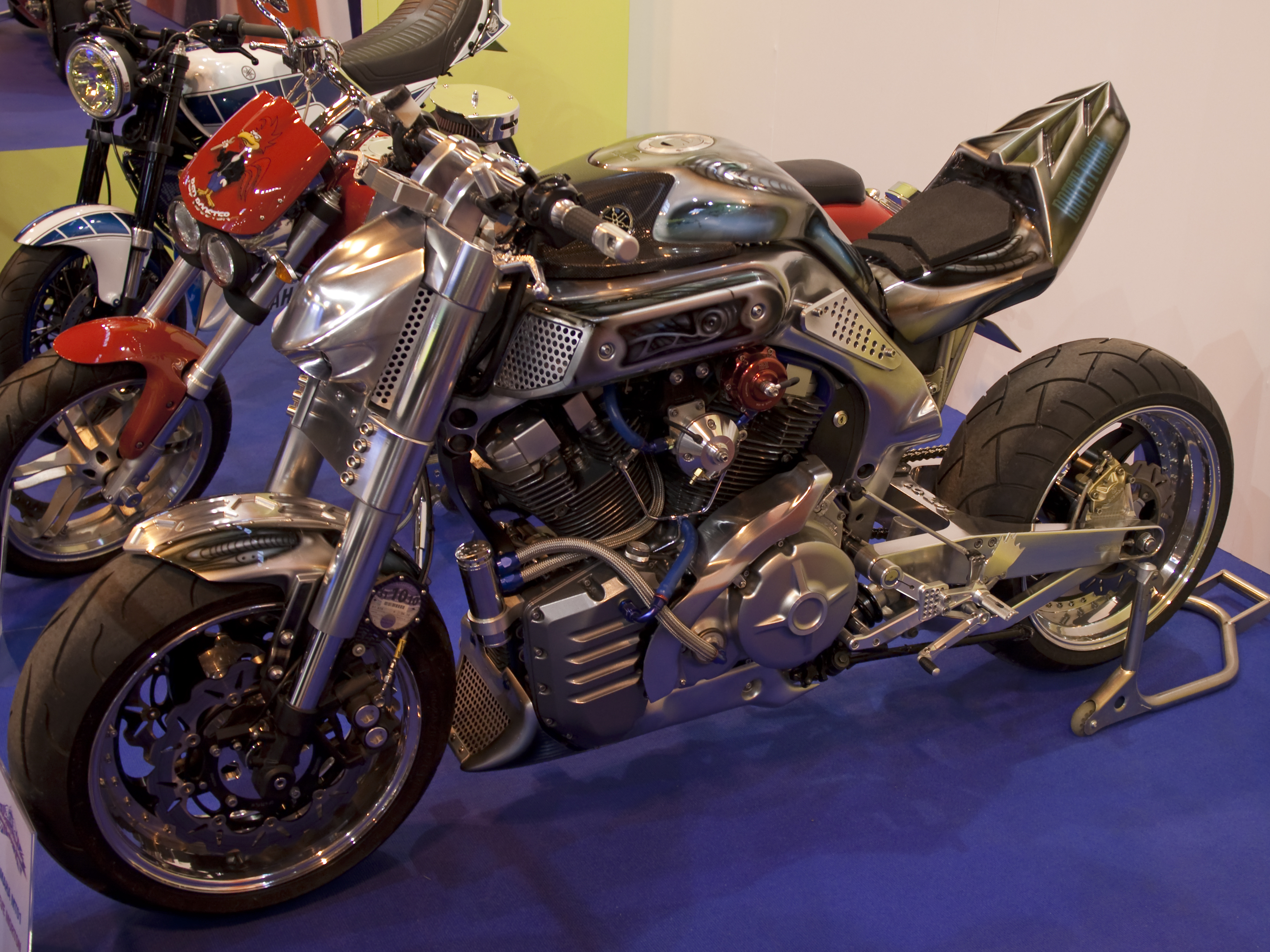
Yamaha MT-01 custom
