= Filler =

In general, a filler is something that is used to fill gaps. Specialized meanings include:

== Materials ==
- Filler (animal food), dietary fiber and other ingredients added to pet foods to provide bulk
- Filler (materials), particles added to a matrix material, usually to improve its properties
- Filler (packaging), a machine designed to fill packaging, usually occurs in food packaging
- Filler metal, metal added in the making of a joint through welding, brazing, or soldering
- Grain filler, a product that is used to achieve a smooth-textured wood finish
- Injectable filler, a soft tissue filler injected into the skin to help fill in facial wrinkles
- Star filler, a plastic insert in computer cables which separates wires

== Media and entertainment ==
- Filler (media), in television and other media, material that exists outside the story arc to pad out other material
- "Filler", song by hardcore punk band Minor Threat, from their debut E.P.

== Other uses ==
- Filler (linguistics), a sound spoken to fill up gaps in utterances
- Placeholder word
- Filler (surname)
- Seat filler, a person who fills an empty seat during an event

== See also ==
- fillér, name of various small change coins throughout Hungarian history, and one hundredth of a Hungarian forint
- Filer (disambiguation)
- Placeholder (disambiguation)
