= Sub =

Sub or SUB may refer to:

== Places ==
- Juanda International Airport, Surabaya, Indonesia, IATA code SUB

== People ==
- Bottom (BDSM), or "sub" for "submissive"
- Substitute teacher

== Christianity ==
- Sub tuum praesidium, an ancient hymn and prayer dedicated to the Blessed Virgin Mary

== Computing and technology ==
- <sub>, an HTML tag for subscript
- SUB designates a subroutine in some programming languages
- SUB, substitute character, ASCII character 26
- SUB, subtraction processor command
- .sub (disambiguation), several file extensions
- Subeditor
- Subwoofer loudspeaker

== Typography ==
- Subscript and superscript
- Subtitle

== Entertainment and media ==
- MTV Sub, a Finnish television channel
- Sub (album), a 2000 album by Swiss industrial metal band Apollyon Sun
- The Sub, a 2017 American short horror film
- Subs (novel), a 2011 novel by Thor Kunkel

== Other uses ==
- Seafarers' Union of Burma, or SUB
- Submarine sandwich, or hero sandwich
- Submarine, a warship with underwater travel capabilities.
- Submersible, an underwater vehicle designed to be completely submerged or operate while submerged.
- Subnature concept
- Subscription

== See also ==
- Semisub
- Süß
- Substitute (disambiguation)
- Submarine (disambiguation)
