= Maung =

Maung may refer to:

== Places ==
- Batu Maung

== People ==
- Maung people of Australia
  - Maung language
- Maung, an honorific in Burmese names
- Bawa Maung
- Cynthia Maung
- Kin Maung
- Kyi Maung
- Maung Khin
- Maung Maung (disambiguation)
- Maung Wunna
- Maung Sein Pe
- Nay Win Maung
- Saw Maung
- Saw Maung (painter)
- Shu Maung
- Shwe Maung
- Thakin Chit Maung
- Thant Sin Maung
- Tin Maung
- Win Maung

== Vehicles ==
- Pindad Maung
