= Filer =

Filer may refer to:

== Places ==
- Filer, Idaho
- Filer, Missouri
- Filer Charter Township, Michigan
  - Filer City, Michigan
- Filer Haven, a cove on Signy Island, Antarctica
- Filer Hill, a mountain near east of Rootville, New York

== Other ==
- Filer (surname)
- Network-attached storage (NAS), device, a specialized device that acts as a file server
  - NetApp filer, a computer storage product

== See also ==
- Filler (disambiguation)
- Filer and Stowell
