= Spacing =

Spacing may refer to:

- Spacing (magazine), a Canadian magazine
- Spacing effect in psychology; the opposite of cramming
- Spacing (typography)
- Spacing, a science fiction term for a theoretical method of execution by space exposure
- Spacing, the distance between microphones in an AB microphone system (see time-of-arrival stereophony)

== See also ==
- Space (disambiguation)
- Spacer (disambiguation)
- Spaced, a British television series
