= FTUB =

FTUB may refer to:

- Federation of Trade Unions of Belarus
- Federation of Trade Unions of Burma
