= Fillery =

Fillery is a surname. Notable people with the surname include:

- Mike Fillery (born 1960), English footballer
- Richard Fillery (1842–1881), English cricketer

== See also ==
- Filler (surname)
