= Spacer =

A spacer can refer to something used to separate two parts in an assembly.

Spacer can also refer to:

== Arts and entertainment ==
- Spacer (album), a 2011 album by Jason Adasiewicz
- "Spacer", a song by Sheila and B. Devotion from the 1980 album King of the World
- "Spacer", a 1938 short story by Sydor Rey
- Spacers, a fictional sociocultural group in Isaac Asimov's Robot series of novels and short stories

== Science and technology ==
=== Biology and medicine ===
- Asthma spacer, medical equipment
- Orthodontic spacer
- Spacer DNA, in genetics
- Spacer in joint replacement

=== Other uses in science and technology ===
- Spacer, an element in HTML web design
- Spacers and standoffs, unthreaded pieces of rigid tubing, often used in electronic equipment
- Rebar spacer, in concrete construction

== Oil and gas industry ==
- Spacer, a viscous fluid used to remove drilling fluids ahead of cement slurry. The spacer is made up with specific fluid attributes, such as viscosity and density that are designed to prohibit the interaction between the mud and cement slurry.

== Other uses ==
- Spacer (self-storage), an Australian online market for self storage
- Spacer or flesh tunnel, a type of body piercing

== See also ==
- Space (disambiguation)
- Spacing (disambiguation)
- Placeholder (disambiguation)
