= Submarine Force =

A Submarine Force or Submarine Service is the branch of a navy responsible for operating submarines.

- Argentine Submarine Force
- Brazilian Submarine Force Command
- People's Liberation Army Navy Submarine Force (China)
- Pakistan Navy Submarine Force
- Royal Australian Navy Submarine Service
- Royal Navy Submarine Service
- Royal Netherlands Navy Submarine Service
- Submarine Forces of France
- Submarine force, Vietnam People's Navy

== See also ==
- Submarine (disambiguation)
- Service (disambiguation)
