= Subbing =

Subbing may refer to:

- Sub-editing
- Submission (BDSM)
- Subsidy (informal, where one person pays in part or full for another person)
- Substitution (disambiguation)
- Subtitling
- Subway (restaurant)
- Subscribing to a user on YouTube
