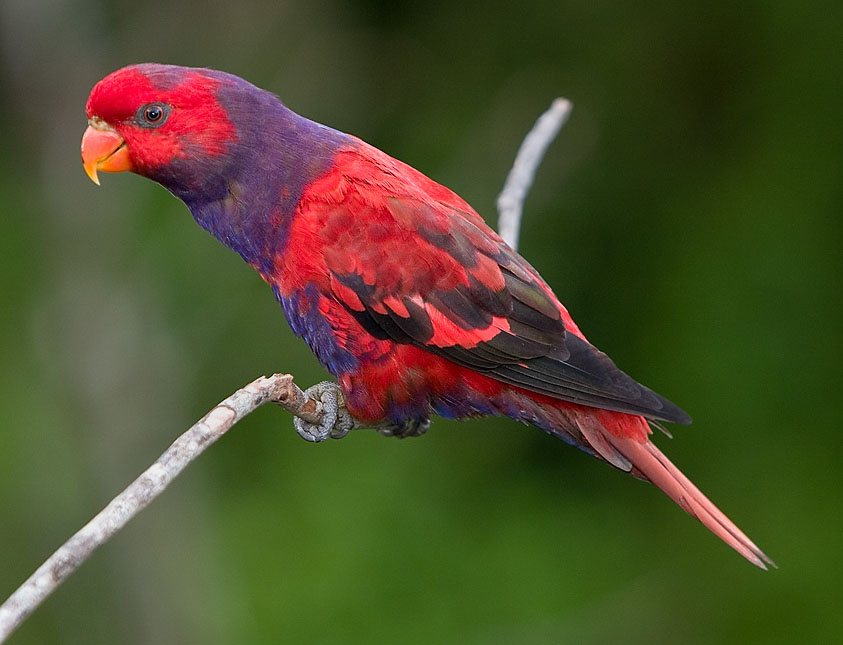

Conservation status
- Least Concern (IUCN 3.1)

Scientific classification
- Kingdom: Animalia
- Phylum: Chordata
- Class: Aves
- Order: Psittaciformes
- Family: Psittaculidae
- Genus: Trichoglossus
- Species: T. squamatus

Binomial name
- Trichoglossus squamatus (Boddaert, 1783)

Synonyms
- Eos squamata

= Violet-necked lory =

The Violet-necked lory (Trichoglossus squamatus) is a parrot species in the Psittaculidae family. It is endemic to eastern Indonesia, and classified as “Least Concern” by the IUCN.

== Taxonomy ==
The violet-necked lory (Trichoglossus squamatus), historically classified as Eos squamata, belongs to the Old World parrot family Psittaculidae and sits within the tribe Loriini, which holds the nectivorous lories and lorikeets. Following recent molecular phylogenetic analyses, the violet-necked lory’s genus shifted from Eos to Trichoglossus, so Eos squamata may still appear in older literature. The six red lory species that formally made up the Eos genus form a monophyletic group whose sister clade is the Wallacean and Philippine lorikeets.

The violet-necked lory has three recognized subspecies within its eastern Indonesia range, separated primarily by geographic isolation:

- Trichoglossus squamatus riciniata (Bechstein, 1811) – north Moluccas
- Trichoglossus squamatus obiensis Rothschild, 1899 – Obi and Bisa Islands (north central Moluccas)
- Trichoglossus squamatus squamatus (Boddaert, 1783) – west Papuan islands

The violet-necked lory was described by the French polymath Georges-Louis Leclerc, Comte de Buffon in 1780 in his Histoire Naturelle des Oiseaux from a specimen obtained from the island of Gebe in the Maluku Islands of eastern Indonesia. The bird was also illustrated in a hand-coloured plate engraved by François-Nicolas Martinet in the Planches Enluminées D'Histoire Naturelle which was produced under the supervision of Edme-Louis Daubenton to accompany Buffon's text. Neither the plate caption nor Buffon's description included a scientific name but in 1783 the Dutch naturalist Pieter Boddaert coined the binomial name Psittacus squamatus in his catalogue of the Planches Enluminées. The violet-necked lory is now placed in the genus Trichoglossus that was introduced by the English naturalist James Francis Stephens in 1826. The specific epithet squamatus is from the Latin squamatus meaning "scaled".

== Description ==
Measuring approximately 27 cm in length, the violet-necked lory is a medium-sized parrot with striking red and violet-blue plumage. Its body is predominantly red, with dark purple-blue extending from its belly to undertail coverts. Depending on the subspecies, its dark blue collar ranges from broad and well defined, to narrow and incomplete, or almost absent. Their scapular feathers are purple with black tips, while the greater wing coverts and flight feathers are red with black edges, and their underwings are mostly red. The lory’s tail has a purple-red colouration and its underside is brownish-red. They have a bright orange bill, a red-orange iris, and grey legs.

In flight violet-necked lories appear dark red and slim bodied with long narrow wings.

There is no sexual dimorphism in the violet-necked lory, as males and females have identical colouration and are similar in size. The juveniles have a much duller plumage colouration, with underparts and mantle margins being darker and slightly barred. Unlike the red-orange iris in adults, the juveniles have a brown iris. They also sometimes exhibit blue plumage on their ear-coverts and crown.

The violet-necked lory bears a strong resemblance to the female eclectus parrot except it has an orange-yellow beak.

== Habitat and distribution ==
The violet-necked lory is endemic to eastern Indonesia, distributed throughout the islands of northern Moluccas and western New Guinea year-round, and uses a wide range of habitats within their small distribution. They are found in lowland forests, along the forest edges, mangroves, disturbed forest, and along the scrubby secondary growth near cultivation and coconut plantations. They can also be found in montane primary forests up to an elevation of 1220 m.

== Behaviour ==
=== Vocalizations ===
Violet-necked loris have a large vocalization repertoire. When perched, they make short metallic notes, high pitched hissing notes, short flat-pitched whistles, nasal screeches, and shrill notes. In addition, they make a series of repeated single short notes, either well-spaced or in a fast sequence. In flight, lories make short ksi-leet! calls similar to those of the Rainbow Lorikeet, but more musical and less harsh.

=== Social structure and movement ===
Violet-necked lories are often observed in mated pairs, trios or small foraging groups of up to ten individuals but will occasionally aggregate in larger flocks of ~25 individuals. They are nectivorous and locally nomadic, moving within their range to follow seasonally fluctuating nectar and pollen resources. While searching for food, they often undertake daily flights across open sea channels between main islands and smaller offshore inlets to forage and roost communally.

== Diet ==
They are nectivorous, and their diets primarily consist of liquid floral nectar and pollen grains, such as flowering sago palm, unripe figs, and the nectar of Erythrina flowers.

=== Feeding physiology ===
The violet-necked lory has key digestive track adaptations as a nectarivore. They have a specialized muscular tongue with brush tips that enables them to easily harvest nectar and pollen. With no need to mechanically grind their food they have a reduced gizzard size, wall thickness, and muscle mass compared to those of seed-eating parrots. The esophagus is adapted to a soft and liquid diet, and they have a longer digestive storage zone between the proventriculus and gizzard to increase the retention time and facilitate the amino acid and protein extraction from the pollen grains they swallow.

== Reproduction ==
There is no information about the breeding ecology of violet-necked lories in the wild. However, in captivity they have been observed laying two eggs, with egg incubation lasting 27 days, and chicks fledging after about 80 days.

== Gallery ==
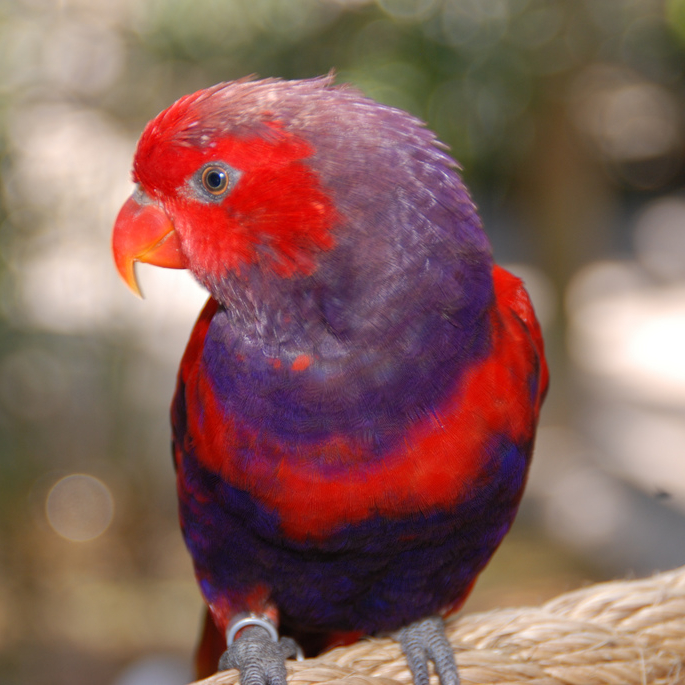
Front

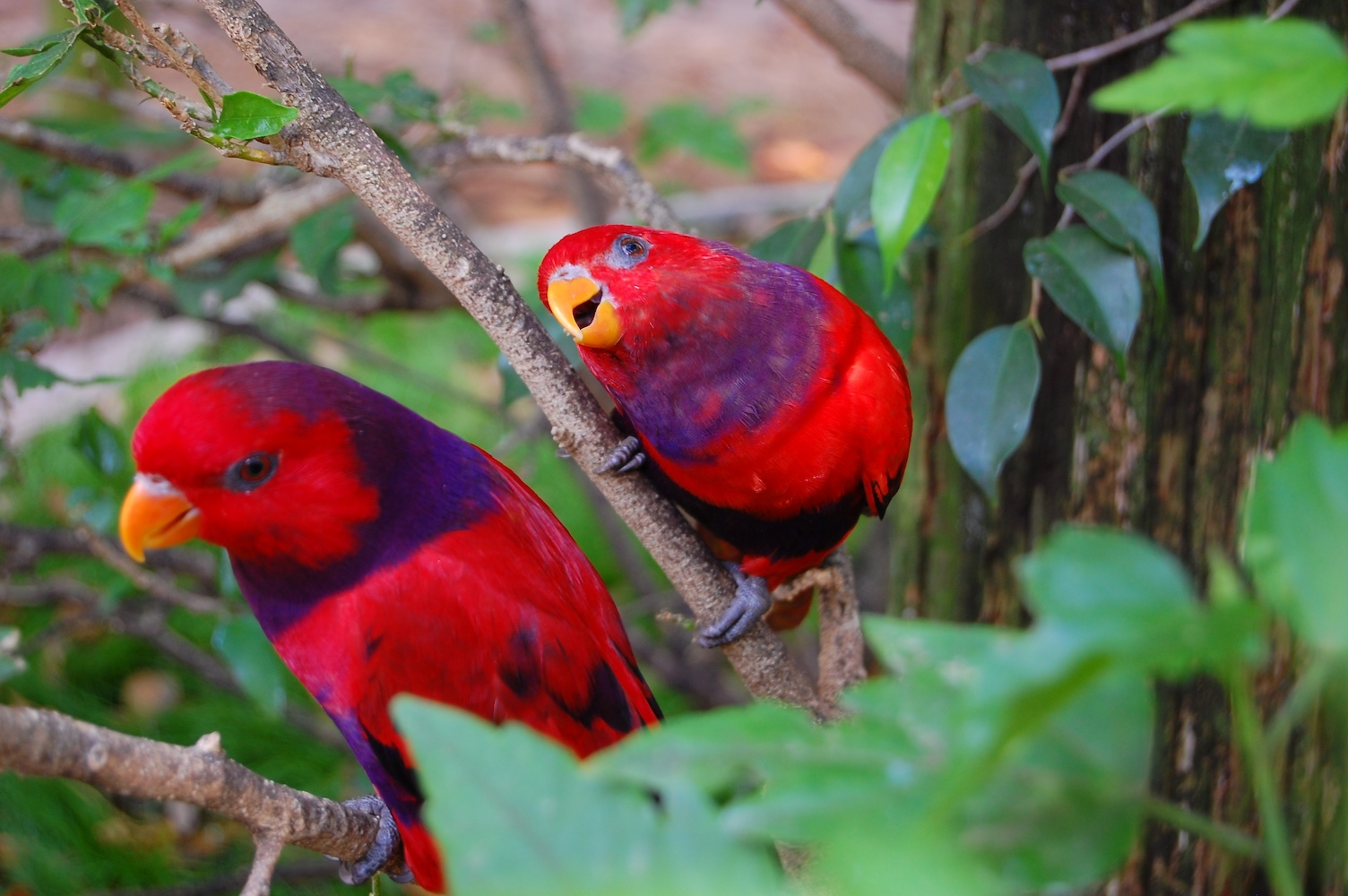

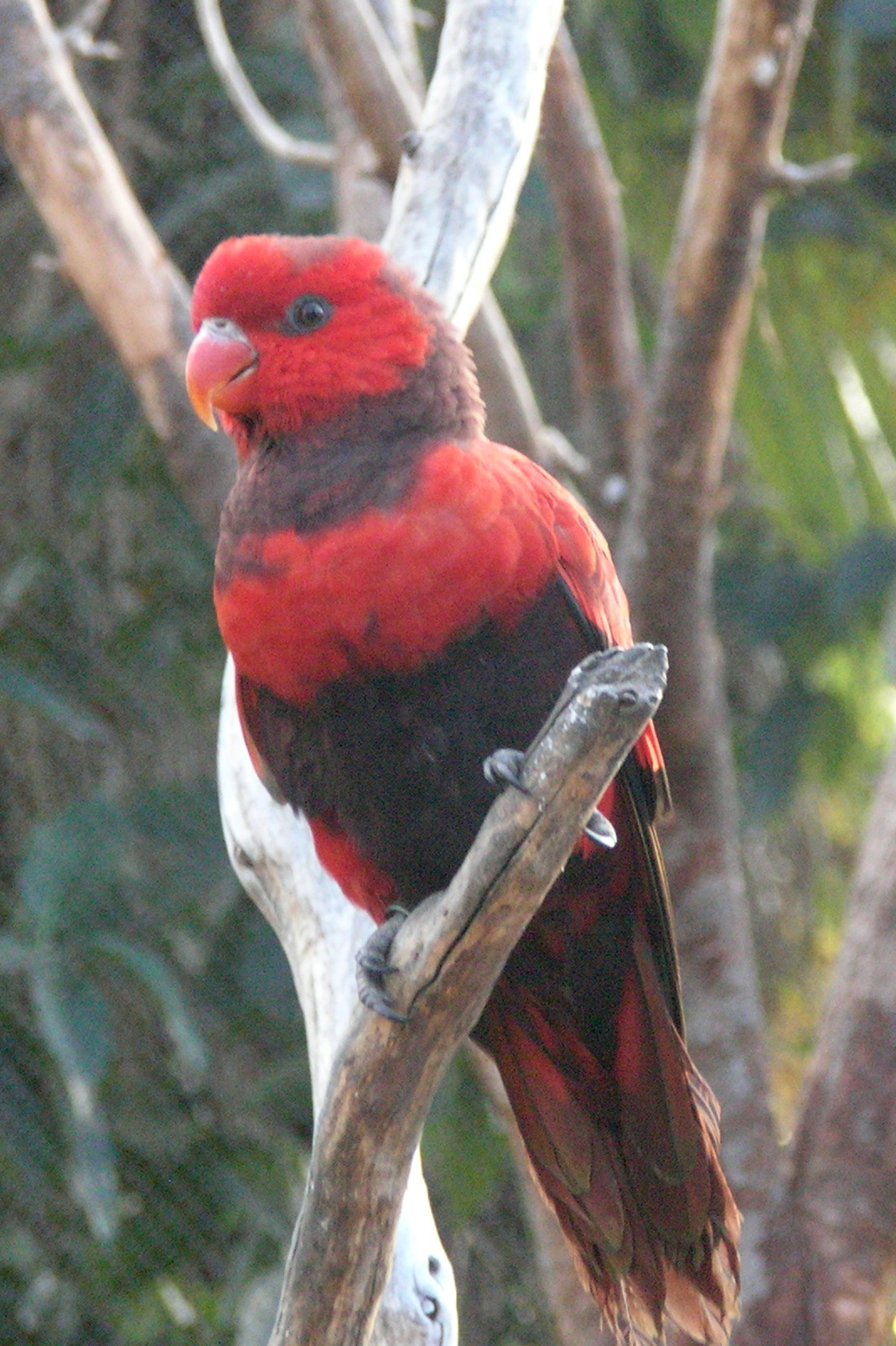

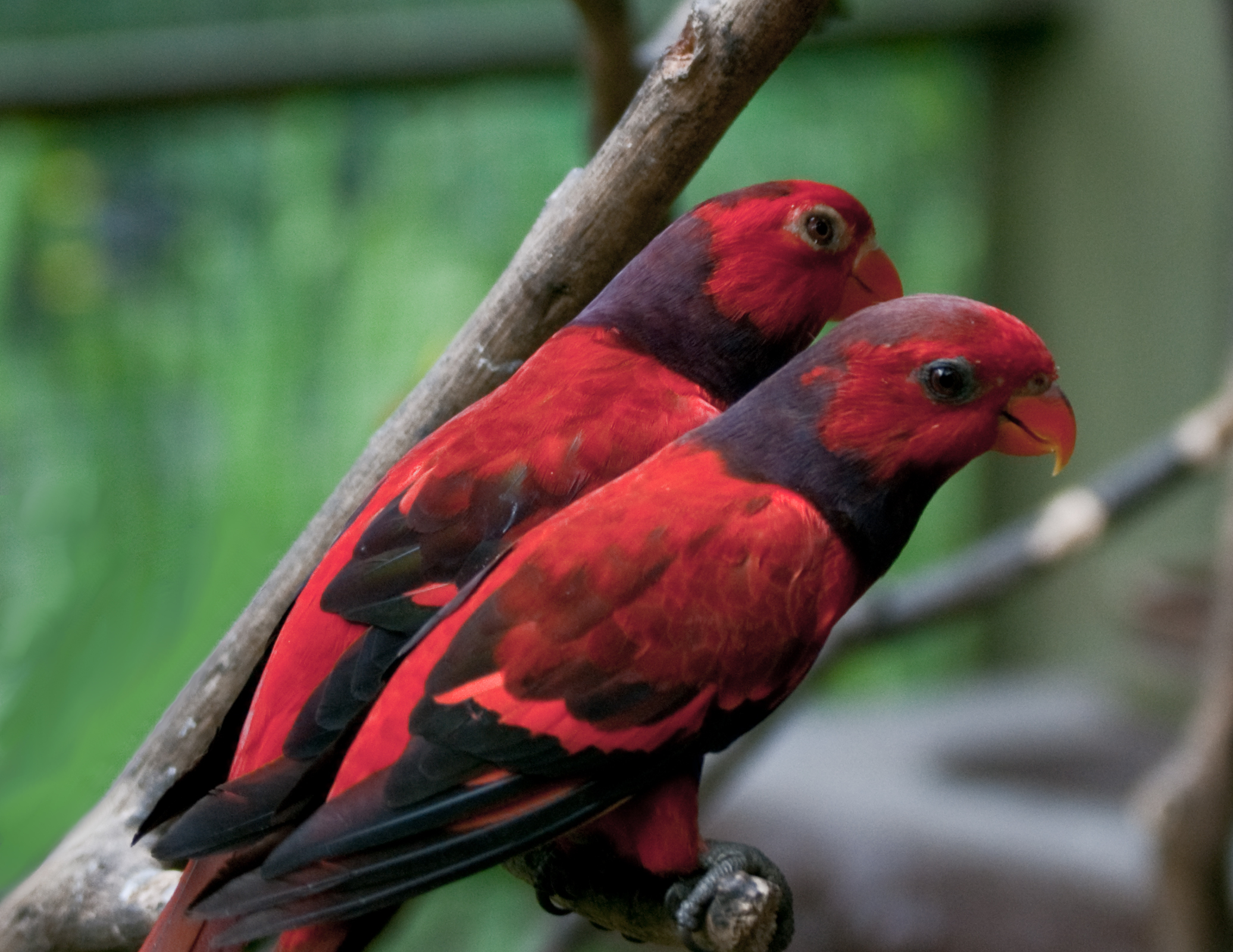

== Cited texts ==
- Forshaw, Joseph M. (2006). Parrots of the World; an Identification Guide. Illustrated by Frank Knight. Princeton University Press. ISBN 0-691-09251-6.
