= Placeholder =

Placeholder may refer to:

== Language ==
- Placeholder word, a term or terms referring to something or somebody whose name is not known or, in that particular context, is not significant or relevant.
- Placeholder name
- Filler text, text generated to fill space or provide unremarkable and/or standardised text.
- Lorem ipsum, a standard Latin text most commonly used to demonstrate a font, typography or layout.

== Mathematics and computer science ==
- Free variable, a symbol subsequently replaced by a value or string.
- Interpoled variable of a string interpolation process.
- Metasyntactic variable, a placeholder name (see above) as used in computer science.
- Format placeholder, used in computing to format strings within print functions (printf).

== Other uses ==
- Line stander, a person standing in a queue for another.
- Placeholder (politics), a person temporarily appointed to an office that would otherwise remain vacant.

== See also ==
- Filler (disambiguation)
- Spacer (disambiguation)
- Stand-in
- Substitute (disambiguation)
- Stadtholder
