= Karol Madaj =

Polish board game designer (born 1980)

- Born: 9 February 1980 (age 46); Warsaw, Poland
- Occupation: Board game designer

Karol Madaj ([ˈkarɔl ˈmadaj]; born 9 February 1980) is a Polish board game designer. Best known for Kolejka, he has designed games for Poland's Institute of National Remembrance, the Polish Humanitarian Organisation, and the National Centre for Culture. In 2013, he was awarded Poland's Gold Cross of Merit for services in the development of historical awareness.

Madaj studied theology at John Paul II Catholic University of Lublin.

== Board games ==
- Awans (2009)
- Pamięć '39 (2009).
- 303 (2010). The game centres on the No. 303 Polish Fighter Squadron during World War II.
- Kolejka (game) (2011). English: Queue. The game teaches about the hardships under communism.
- Kolejka: Ogonek (2011)
- Znaj znak (2012)
- Znaj znak - Pamięć (2013)
- Letnisko (2013). English: Summer Resort
- Strajk. Skok do wolności (2013). English: Strike! For Solidarity. The game focuses on the Solidarity movement.
- 111 (2013). A prequel to 303.
- Reglamentacja. Gra Na Kartki (2014). English: Regulation: The Coupons Game. The game focuses on rationing of food and other goods during communism.
