= Roost =

Roost may refer to:

== Animal resting ==
- Human to rest or sleep.
- Roosting, resting behavior of birds
- Communal roosting, a behavior of some birds and other animals
- Monarch butterfly roosts, communal resting sites in monarch butterfly migration
- Bat roost, a list of places where bats roost

== Other uses ==
- Roost Records, an American jazz record label
- Roost Books, an imprint of Shambhala Publications
- Roost Shared Storage, an American self-storage company acquired by the Australian company Spacer
- The Roost, a 2005 American horror film
- The Roost (podcast network), a division of Rooster Teeth Productions
- The Roost (Washington), a mountain in Washington state, US

== See also ==
- Jan Van der Roost (born 1956), Belgian composer
- Roost-Warendin, France
- Roest, a surname
