= Roest =

Roest is a Dutch toponymic surname. Roest is an archaic term for a reed bed, indicating an ancestor living in or nearby one. People with this surname include:

- Elbert Roest (born 1954), Dutch politician and historian
- Meyer Roest (1821–1889), Dutch bibliographer
- Nikki de Roest born 1993), Dutch football player
- Niklas Roest (born 1986), Norwegian hockey player
- Patrick Roest (born 1995), Dutch speed skater
- Robert Roest (born 1969), Dutch football player
- Stacy Roest (born 1974), Canadian hockey player
- Theodorus Marinus Roest (1832–1898), Dutch naturalist
- Theodorus Marinus Roest van Limburg (1806–1887), Dutch journalist

== See also ==
- Roost (disambiguation)
- Røst Municipality, a municipality in Nordland county, Norway
- Røstlandet, an island in Nordland county, Norway
