= Kolejka (game) =

Polish educational game about shortage economies

Kolejka (Polish) Queue (English)
- Designers: Karol Madaj
- Illustrators: Natalia Baranowska, Marta Malesińska
- Publishers: Institute of National Remembrance
- Publication: 2011
- Genres: board game
- Languages: Polish, English, German, Spanish, Japanese, French, Romanian, Russian, Czech
- Players: 2–5
- Playing time: 60 minutes
- Age range: 12 and up

Kolejka ([kɔˈlɛi̯ka]; Polish for "queue" or "line (of people)") is a board game designed by Karol Madaj and launched in February 2011 by Poland's Institute of National Remembrance. It was designed to teach young generations about the hardships under Poland's communist regime (1945–1989), particularly the difficulty of acquiring consumer goods in the shortage economy. The game has been described as inspired by Monopoly.

== Educational purpose ==
Kolejka is one of several educational and historical games released by Poland's Institute of National Remembrance (IPN). Karol Madaj, the game's creator, said the goal was to "show young people and remind the older ones what hard times these were and what mechanisms were at play".

In keeping with its educational goal, the cards illustrate historical goods of the era in which they were sold, and the game is accompanied by an historical brochure explaining the economic realities of the shortage economy in communist Poland. The first Polish edition was also distributed with a documentary film. Polish historian Andrzej Zawistowski supervised the game's design for historical accuracy.

== Gameplay ==
The game is played by two to five players, each controlling five pawns, representing their family members. Each family needs to do some shopping for events such as birthdays or holidays, however, each player faces the problem of a shortage of needed goods. The stores are mostly empty, and there is no certainty as to what will be delivered or when and where it will be delivered. The players have to decide which store to queue in front of, and can play various event cards such as "This isn't your place", "Colleague in the government", or "Store closed", changing the order of the pawns in the queue (which represents jumping the queue, or forcing other players out of it). Goods can also be exchanged on the bazaar (black market). The first player to collect the required set of goods cards is the winner.

== Versions and expansion ==
An international version of the board game, which includes manuals and translation stickers in Polish, English, German, Spanish, Japanese and Russian, was released in 2012. A French edition was added in 2013, and a Romanian version called "Stai la coadă" (Stand in line) was released later that year, on November 26.

An expansion, "Ogonek" (Polish for "curved end of the queue", lit. "tail"), adding another player and a number of additional cards and supplementary educational materials, was also released.

== Reception ==
By July 2012 the game has sold 20,000 copies of the Polish edition within a year and has been described as best selling. By June 2014, the total production run of the game was almost 100,000 copies. It has also proven popular abroad. In the summer of 2014, IPN sold the game's license to a private company (Trefl), citing its inability to efficiently manage the game's production, demand for which regularly exceeded IPN's production budget, and led—ironically, as numerous sources described—to shortages in the game's availability.

The game has received good reviews, both for its game play and its educational value. It has been used in history classes. The game received the 2012 "Gra Roku" (Game of the Year) Polish board gaming award, becoming the first Polish board game to receive this particular award.

In 2016, some rumours appeared that Rospotrebnadzor declared Kolejka "anti-Russian" and excessively critical of the Soviet system; it said the game would be banned in Russia unless direct historical references were removed, which IPN refused to do. Andrzej Zawistowski, IPN's director of education, said that "When Russia takes the Soviet Union's history as its own, it leads to some Russians thinking that criticizing the Soviet Union as a totalitarian regime is the same as attacking contemporary Russia.". Later on, it was revealed that it was the initiative of the distributing company, and the staff of Rospotrebnadzor first heard the story from mainstream news.

== See also ==
- Line stander (stacz kolejkowy)
