= Line stander =

Person who takes a position in a queue in place of another

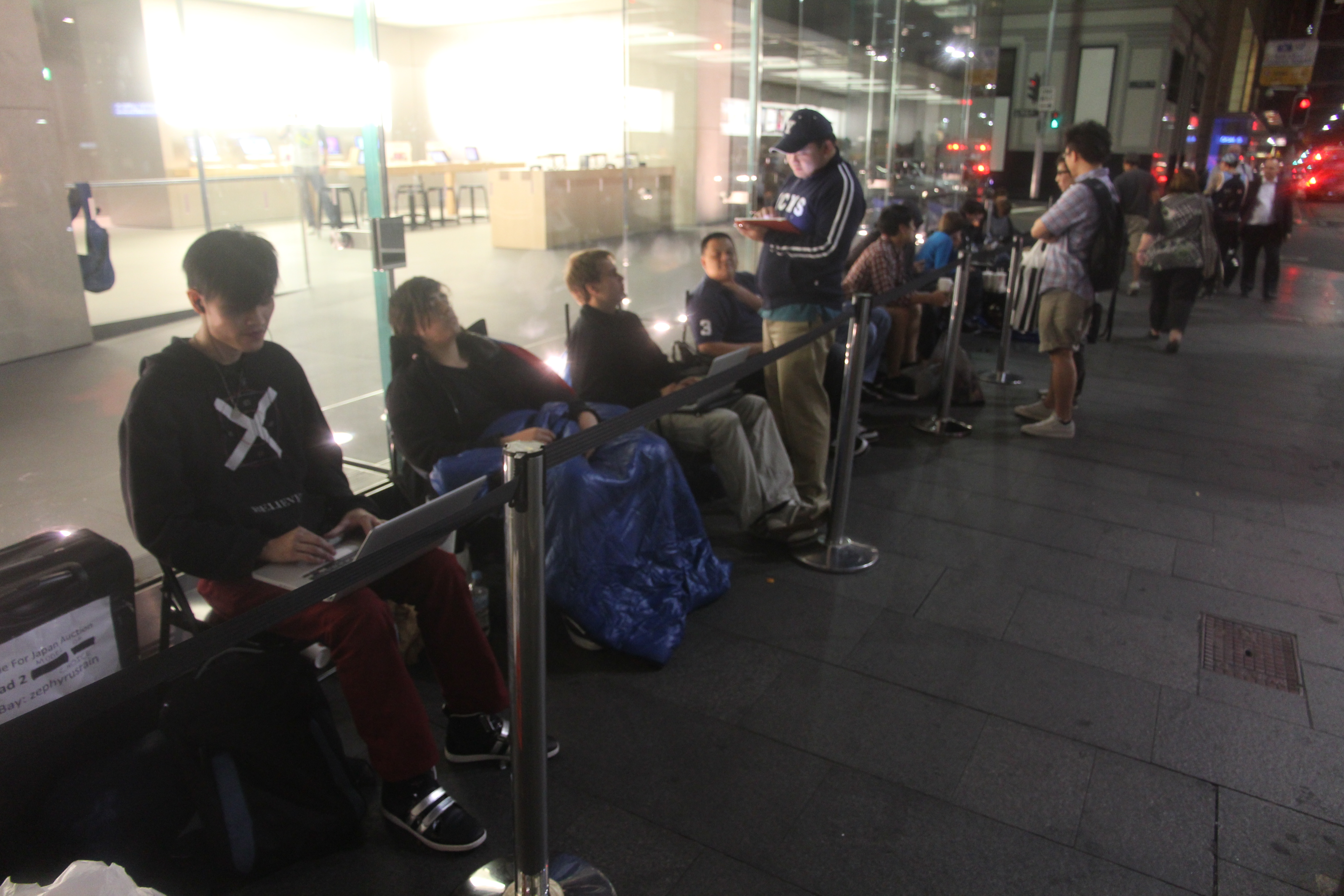
People in line at the Sydney Australia Apple Store for the launch of the iPad 2

A line stander, queue stander, line sitter or queue professional is a person who takes a position in a queue in place of another, often for payment. This informal occupation came to an existence out of the necessity to stand long times in queues.

== Practice ==
Line sitting is often a paid endeavor, with companies recruiting people, sometimes homeless people, to sit in lines for a price. In some circumstances, people can make sufficient money to line sit professionally.

In rare cases, people also choose to sit in line for non-monetary purposes, e.g. for media attention at major events, Greg Packer is an example of this.

The practice of line sitting has drawn academic research. A study conducted by Georgetown University and Johns Hopkins University employs queueing theory and game theory to study the economic and operational dynamics of line sitting. The researchers contrast line sitting with the commonly used pay-for-priority scheme and show why line sitting can be a win-win for the service provider and customers alike.

== Around the world ==
=== Poland ===
In Poland, this peculiar occupation (Polish: stacz kolejkowy) was reported as a neologism during the early 1980s. By the end of the Communist regime there were severe shortages of consumer goods. With the transition to a market economy, shortages gradually went away, but the business opportunities for linestanders remained.

A Polish professional line stander, Tadeusz Żak, has said that his profession requires certain personal traits: honesty, credibility, activity, persistence, and perseverance. He says he once stood in line for 40 hours. His specialization is lines in hospitals for registration to high-demand and rare specialists. In 2013 Żak lost his 13-year-old business, because local hospitals introduced advance registration. Fortunately, Polish newspapers made "pan Tadek" a celebrity, and he started receiving various offers, some unrelated to his "business", for example, a role of a marionette in opera Rigoletto (because he is a dwarf). In 2014 he even accepted an invitation from the Democratic Left Alliance to stand for the city council in his home city of Tarnów.

Recently, line standers have started to take advantage of modern technology. In 2015, one of the winners of the Business Intelligence Hackathon API (BIHAPI) contest in Poland was a mobile app with a recognizable name "Stacz Kolejkowy" ("line stander").

Another peculiarity of Polish shortage economy and the resulting long queues were "queue list" (lista kolejkowa) and "queue committee" (komitet kolejkowy). When the waiting time was long, conflicts often arose about the place in the queue. (The corresponding phrase "Pan tu nie stał!" ("You didn't stand here, sir!") has become an element of PRL nostalgia.) To mitigate these conflicts, a spontaneous "queue list" used to be established, and in many cases, especially when waiting could be for a day or even several days, due to delivery delays, an ad-hoc volunteer "queue committee" used to be formed to maintain the queue list.

=== United States ===
The practice of "linestanding" or "seatholding" is a service provided in Washington, D.C. to lobbyists, corporate legislative offices, non-profit organizations, lawyers, and other people having an interest in matters being debated or bills being marked up by the United States House of Representatives or United States Senate. The linestanding company will send someone to Capitol Hill to stand in line well in advance of the hearing or mark-up to help the client gain entry into the hearing room with a good seat in the visitors gallery. This practice had reportedly existed for 20 years, but it attracted media attention in March 2012, when during the Supreme Court hearings on the Affordable Care Act, professional linestanders stood there for four days.

Part-time line stander Robert Samuel came up with the idea after making a Craigslist post offering to queue for the iPhone 5 in 2012.

On October 18, 2007, Senator Claire McCaskill from Missouri proposed that linestanding for registered lobbyists be made illegal. Her feeling was that lobbyists should have to stand in line with everyone else. A linestanding company wrote in response to McCaskill's bill that eliminating the linestanding industry would eliminate hundreds of entry-level jobs and increase costs for all involved.

In March 2012, the Supreme Court heard an unprecedented three days of oral arguments in regards to the Affordable Care Act (President Obama's Health Care Reform Law). Linestanders stood on 1st Street NE for four days holding spaces for various State Attorneys General, industry lobbyists, healthcare professors, and other interested parties.

Other examples of linestanding services include a service launched in Birmingham, AL as a response to the long wait times at the Jefferson County Courthouse Department of Motor Vehicles.

=== Venezuela ===
In 2015, a line stander from Venezuela, Krisbell Villarroel, a 22-year-old single mother of two small children, made the news around the globe. Her "business model", based on consumer good shortage, is different. Early in the morning she is on the phone to figure out what and where is to be on sale, then she stands in lines to buy various stuff and resell it to her customers who don't have time to stand in lines. She is one of many representatives of a new occupation of "profesionales de la fila" ("queue professionals") in Venezuela. Reportedly, a number of restaurants in Caracas have a dedicated person on their staff whose duties are solely to stand in lines in supermarkets to get necessary supplies.

=== Italy ===
In 2014, all major Italian media outlets covered Giovanni Cafaro, "il Primo Codista Italiano" (the First Italian Queue Professional). He even started giving classes for aspiring line-standers.

=== Russia ===
In Russian, the word ocherednik (from the word очередь, "queue") has long referred to a person who is listed in some formal queue. In modern Russia professional ocheredniks call themselves by the Spanish term "tramitador" (трамитадор), which (in Spanish) refers to a person who pushes the paperwork through a bureaucratic process (trámite). While the serviced queues include tickets for sports, pop concerts, etc., a large number of queues may be created by the sloppiness of Russian bureaucracy: most popular requests for tramitadors are for queues to tax inspectorate and the recorder of deeds, followed by the Federal Migration Service and the passport office.

== See also ==
- Cutting in line
- Placeholder
- Kolejka (game)
