= Clear Secure =

American technology company

Clear Secure, Inc.
- Trade name: CLEAR
- Formerly: Verified Identity Pass, Inc.; AlClear, LLC
- Type: Public
- Traded as: NYSE: YOU; S&P 600 component
- Industry: Identity verification
- Founded: 2003 (as Verified Identity Pass); 2012 (as Clear)
- Founders: Caryn Seidman-Becker; Ken Cornick
- Headquarters: 85 10th Avenue; New York, NY 10011; U.S.
- Number of locations: 55+ airports, stadiums, and other venues (2024)
- Area served: United States
- Products: CLEAR Plus; TSA PreCheck Enrollment Provided by CLEAR
- Services: Identity Verification; Platform
- Revenue: ▲US$770 million (2024)
- Net income: ▼US$−170 million (2024)
- Total assets: ▲US$1.19 billion (2024)
- Total equity: ▼US$238 million (2024)
- Number of employees: 4,022 (2024)
- Website: clearme.com

Clear Secure, Inc. is a biometrics-based technology company headquartered in New York City. The company operates travel document verification systems at numerous airports and stadiums. It was founded in 2003, but shut down in 2009 after filing for bankruptcy. It was relaunched in 2012 and went public in 2021.

Clear partners with airports, who allow it to operate in exchange for commissions on new members. It has received scrutiny for security incidents in which people were able to pass through its system without proper identification. It has also been subject to ethical criticism for enabling wealthier flyers who can afford its service to bypass security lines without speeding up the security process as a whole.

== History ==
=== Origin and founders ===
Steven Brill and Ajay Amlani were the original owners of Clear, a subsidiary of Verified Identity Pass, founded in 2003. Ajay Amlani left the company in 2006 to pursue another identity technology company named YOU Technology. Steven Brill stepped away from the company in 2008. Clear shut down in 2009 after filing for bankruptcy.

=== 2010s ===
Caryn Seidman-Becker purchased CLEAR out of bankruptcy in 2010 with her partner and co-founder Ken Cornick. They relaunched the company in 2012. Clear operates out of its headquarters in Manhattan, New York.

=== 2020s ===
In 2021, Clear went public as Clear Secure, Inc. on the NYSE with the ticker symbol 'YOU'.

In 2022, Clear's verification service allowed an airline passenger using a false identity to pass through its system; the passenger was also found by the TSA to be carrying ammunition. The company noted in a formal statement that it was due to "a single human error". The program's facial-recognition system for enrolling new customers was also noted as sometimes relying on inadequate photos such as the chin or shoulder.

Two further security incidents occurred in 2023, where individuals not enrolled in the company's security program were escorted through a TSA security checkpoint without having presented their identification. One of the incidents involved a passenger who had used a boarding pass that was picked out of a trash bin.

In November 2024, Clear debuted new EnVe Pods that it claims will reduce the time it takes to verify travelers; no fingerprint or eye scan will be required. Instead, the pods will use high-resolution, wide-angle cameras to identify users. According to Clear, the process will be five times faster than the current system.

== Corporate affairs ==
=== Business model ===
The business model of Clear involves partnerships with airports, with the company sharing a portion of its revenue with these entities. For example, Los Angeles International Airport (LAX) receives 12.5% of Clear's revenue generated at the airport, while San Francisco International Airport (SFO) and Chicago's O'Hare and Midway International Airport receive similar percentages.

While Clear can expedite the security screening process for its customers, the effectiveness of TSA's PreCheck program has increased in recent years. In some cases, PreCheck may offer comparable or even faster screening times, potentially reducing the perceived value of Clear's services.

=== Patents ===
The company has received patents for "physical token-less security screening using biometrics", which allows a person to be identified using their individual and distinctive biometric identity that the company creates. The company has been successful in filing and receiving several patents throughout the years. On February 4, 2020, the company was granted the ability to ticket people through their biometric identities. Before this patent, the company was also granted two patents on January 14, 2020, to conduct pre-identification before an individual approached the stationed device and to use individual biometric identities to expedite interactions with people in the close vicinity. To simplify and expedite the process even further, on December 31, 2019, the company was granted a patent to use mobile devices in enrolling into the system.

Clear has partnerships with the European company Oberthur Technologies. Oberthur provides Clear with identification cards encoded with information that is beyond a normal ID card. They follow the NIST standard FIPS 201 (Federal Information Processing Standard Publication 201) for Personal Identity Verification (PIV), a requirement for all U.S. government employees and contractors.

=== Marketing and collaborations ===
Clear has partnerships with airlines and stadiums. The airline currently partners with Delta Air Lines, United Airlines, and Alaska Airlines. This includes partnerships with Major League Baseball and National Football League. CLEAR has also partnered with Lyft which grants people a 3-month free trial to test out Clear and gives them a $20 voucher for Lyft customers to use towards a trip to any airport.

Clear has pursued partnerships with airlines, sports leagues, and technology platforms to integrate identity verification in travel and ticketing contexts, with arrangements varying by partner.

Clear is a member of the FIDO Alliance and the CARIN Alliance. In June 2012, Clear received certification under the SAFETY Act (Support Anti-Terrorism by Fostering Effective Technologies Act of 2002) by the United States Department of Homeland Security.

=== Revenue ===
The company charges its customers $219 per year for a premium program named CLEAR Plus, however, it can be lowered if the user is a member of Delta SkyMiles, United MileagePlus, or holds an American Express Centurion, Platinum, or AmEx Green Card. This membership allows them to potentially skip long lines, whether they are at a stadium, an arena, or an airport. By expanding and diversifying their locations, Clear also receives additional revenue from sports teams, who pay licensing fees.

== Reception ==
=== Security incidents ===
Clear's security incidents have gathered the attention of the House Homeland Security Committee, with members Bennie Thompson and John Katko in December 2022 requesting that the TSA require all passengers, including those using Clear, have their ID verified by TSA. In August 2023 TSA advised the company and participating airports to increase the number of IDs to be checked by a TSA officer.

=== Ethical criticism ===
Clear has been criticized for enabling wealthier flyers who can afford its service to bypass airport security lines. David Zipper, writing for Slate, argued that "the entirety of Clear's offer to American flyers [is,] pay us money and give us your biometric data, and in return you can jump in front of other people to access an essential federal service." He contrasted its program with TSA's PreCheck, which provides some value to all flyers by speeding up the overall security process. He also criticized the commissions paid to airports, which, he argued, create a perverse incentive for them to make the security process for non-Clear customers worse.

Some lawmakers have proposed legislation curtailing the company's practices. North Carolina U.S. Representative Wiley Nickel told Slate, "Airport security is an essential government function, funded by taxpayers. We should level the field to let everyone travel as quickly as possible, regardless of whether you have the extra money to push to the front of the line." A 2024 bill authored by California State Senator Josh Newman would prevent Clear from bypassing lines in the state's airports.
