= Greg Packer =

American highway maintenance worker (born 1963)

Gregory F. Packer
- Born: December 18, 1963 (age 62); Huntington, New York
- Occupation: Highway maintenance worker
- Years active: 1995–present
- Known for: Being quoted as a "man on the street"

Gregory F. Packer (born December 18, 1963) is a retired American highway maintenance worker from Huntington, New York, best known for frequently being quoted as a "man on the street" in newspapers, magazines and television broadcasts from 1995 to the present. He has been quoted in hundreds of articles and television broadcasts as a member of the public (that is, a "man on the street" rather than a newsmaker or expert). Although he always gives his real name, he has admitted to making things up to get into the paper.

Packer's status as a frequent interviewee is due to a number of factors, including seeking out members of the press and appearing friendly, although mostly it is due to his hobby of attending public appearances of celebrities and other media events and attempting to be first in line on such occasions. This has led to him being dubbed a professional line sitter. It has also led to Packer's other claim to fame: being the first person in the world to buy an iPhone, on June 29, 2007 at Apple Fifth Avenue in New York City, after having camped out for five days in front of the store. (He tried to similarly be the first to buy an iPad in 2010, but was bumped from the first position in line due to not having a reservation.) His efforts to be first in line have also allowed him to meet people including Mariah Carey, Garth Brooks, Dennis Rodman and Ringo Starr, as well as at least four presidents of the United States: Jimmy Carter, Bill Clinton, George W. Bush and (before he became president) Donald Trump.

== Early life ==
Greg Packer was born to Eleanor and Sidney Packer in Huntington, New York. He is the youngest of four siblings: Aileen, Marcia and Jeffery. He attended Huntington High School, in Huntington on Long Island, graduating in 1983.

== Notable man on the street quotes ==
The first known quote of Packer ran in The Tampa Tribune on October 6, 1995, when Packer was 31:

"The Jewish people are fans of Pope John Paul II", said Greg Packer of Huntington, N.J. [sic] "He does not limit his message to one faith; he reaches out to everybody."

The identification of Packer's home state as New Jersey appears to have been an error: there is no Huntington, New Jersey.

According to a 2002 article about Packer, "He was first in the line to see ground zero when the viewing platform opened at the World Trade Center site December 30, 2001. He was the first in line in 1997 to sign the condolence book at the British consulate when Princess Diana died. He slept outside in the snow in Washington, D.C., in January 2001 to be the first in line to greet President George W. Bush after his inauguration."

His quotes have ranged from the expression of common sentiments, such as "It's a day for happiness and to be together", regarding the New York City St. Patrick's Day Parade, to colorful statements such as his opinion of a New York Yankees game played on Yom Kippur: "There's no way the Yankees will lose, but if they do, they will certainly have something to atone for."

== Notoriety as frequent man on the street ==
In June 2003, columnist Ann Coulter and blogger Mickey Kaus, commenting on media coverage of Hillary Rodham Clinton's memoir Living History, noted that Packer was "the centerpiece of The New York Times' 'man on the street' interview about Hillary-mania." Packer had been quoted in the Times as stating, "I'm a big fan of Hillary and Bill's. I want to change her mind about running for president. I want to be part of her campaign." Coulter said:

It was easy for the Times to spell Packer's name right because he is apparently the entire media's designated "man on the street" for all articles ever written. He has appeared in news stories more than 100 times as a random member of the public. Packer was quoted on his reaction to military strikes against Iraq; he was quoted at the St. Patrick's Day Parade, the Thanksgiving Day Parade and the Veterans Day Parade. He was quoted at not one—but two—New Year's Eve celebrations at Times Square. He was quoted at the opening of a new "Star Wars" movie, at the opening of an H&M clothing store on Fifth Avenue and at the opening of the viewing stand at Ground Zero. He has been quoted at Yankees games, Mets games, Jets games—even getting tickets for the Brooklyn Cyclones. He was quoted at a Clinton fund-raiser at Alec Baldwin's house in the Hamptons and the pope's visit to Giants stadium.

According to the Nexis database, from 1994 through 2004 Packer was quoted or photographed at least 16 separate times by the Associated Press, 14 times by Newsday, 13 times by the New York Daily News, and 12 times by the New York Post. He had also been quoted in the Los Angeles Times, The Philadelphia Inquirer, and The Times, as well as having appearances on CNN, MSNBC and Fox News.

As a result of Coulter's column, Packer was profiled in his own right by The New York Times. The Associated Press sent out a memo to its news editors and correspondents, stating in part:

The world is full of all kinds of interesting people. One of them is Greg Packer of Huntington, N.Y., who apparently lives to get his name on the AP wire and in other media. It works: A Nexis search turned up 100 mentions in various publications… Mr. Packer is clearly eager to be quoted. Let's be eager, too—to find other people to quote.

After the ubiquity of Packer's quotes became public, he was still quoted and referred to occasionally, but sometimes with more disclosure of his identity provided. When Bill Clinton began his book tour for his memoir My Life, Packer was first in line for Clinton's first signing; a 2004 New York Times article on Clinton's appearance referred to Packer as "Greg Packer, 40, wearing a New York Yankees shirt, who has been cultivating the press for several years now and manages to attend at least two news events a week."

The blog TechCrunch reported on Packer in 2010 when he was first in line to buy an iPad. This caused Nicholas Carlson of Silicon Alley Insider to refer to Packer as "the same stupid guy who's first in line for everything."

In 2010, New York Times reporter Nicholas Confessore wrote a short humorous essay about soliciting a quote from a man holding an Andrew Cuomo 2010 poster, finding out that it was Packer, and moving along to find someone else to quote.

== Additional man on the street quotes ==
Even after 2003, many journalists have remained unaware, or unconcerned, about Packer's reputation. When Packer attended the Super Bowl victory rally for the Pittsburgh Steelers in 2006, the Pittsburgh Tribune-Review identified him only as "Greg Packer, 42, a lifelong Steelers fan from Huntington, N.Y." In 2008, now celebrating the Super Bowl victory rally of the New York Giants, he was identified by the Rocky Mountain News only as "Greg Packer, 44, a retired highway maintenance worker." Though he had previously claimed to be a Steelers fan, Packer stated he was "all about the Giants", and "as proud as [he] was in the Yankees' dynasty years." Later in 2008, he attended the victory parade for the World Series champion Philadelphia Phillies. He told the New York Times on that occasion that "In New York right now, we have no Mets, no Yankees, no stadiums… I came here to represent and cheer our neighbors." On New Year's Eve in Times Square, Packer told the New York Daily News, "I love it. I mean, everybody from all over the world comes just to watch a Waterford crystal ball. It's great."

In 2016, Packer was quoted in Time magazine at the Strawberry Fields memorial in New York City on the anniversary of John Lennon's death, saying, "With everything going on in the world, we really need to listen to John's message about more peace and love, and more understanding and more acceptance in the world."

In August 2017, Packer was interviewed by The Independent as part of a crowd gathered in New York City to watch the solar eclipse over the U.S. Several months later, he was interviewed in the New York Daily News before attending Midnight Mass at St. Patrick's Cathedral, saying "It's Cardinal Dolan that keeps me coming back year after year." Several days after that, he was interviewed by Reuters while in Times Square for New Year's Eve, saying "It feels more like Antarctica than New York. But everybody in the world is here."

Packer has also been interviewed after being the first, or one of the first, in line to, among other things, buy copies of Donald Trump's book Think Big and Kick Ass in New York City in 2007, buy soup at the newly-reopened The Original Soupman location in New York City in 2010, buy a meal at the first Sonic Drive-In location in Long Island in 2011, shop at a Best Buy location in New York City on Black Friday in 2011, attend the funeral of Whitney Houston in the public spectator area in Newark, New Jersey in 2012, buy tickets for a touring production of Hamilton in Hartford, Connecticut in 2018, and attend the memorial for George Floyd in Raeford, North Carolina in 2020.

== Personal views on notoriety ==
In 2004, Packer described his success at being quoted as, "I always come up with an answer for everything, number one. And… I always give everybody… the respect and the time that they need." He has also said that he tries to "just be myself, [and] show how happy I am to be in the front row".

In a 2013 interview, Packer stated that "The first time I saw my name in print, I couldn't believe that I made a major newspaper. That made me feel that I accomplished something." He also expressed disappointment at the directives issued by various news organizations to not quote him, saying, "if I'm their source for an interview, I don't see where the problem is at all. What I do is not only helping reporters do their jobs, but it's also helping me tell my family and friends where I've been. So it's a case of helping each other."
