= Myanmar Maritime Trade Unions Federation =

Myanmar Maritime Trade Unions (MaPaTha MMTU)
- Headquarters: Bangkok, Thailand & Yangon, Myanmar
- Location: Burma (Myanmar)
- Key people: Aung Thu Ya, President Ko Ko Aung, Vice President
- Affiliations: CTUM, ITF
- Website: www.myanmaritf.org

The Myanmar Maritime Trade Unions Federation, formerly known as Seafarers Union of Burma (SUB) is a trade union in Myanmar. It represents an estimated 20,000-30,000 workers in the international shipping industry, many of whom work on Flag of Convenience ships and suffer from poor work and pay conditions.

Founded in 1991 by the Burmese seafarers who are in trouble and get contact with the International Transport Workers Federation (ITF) and its affiliated maritime unions around the world and supported by the Federation of Trade Unions of Burma (FTUB) in opposition to the government sanctioned "Myanmar Overseas Seafarers Association" (MOSA), SUB remains banned in Burma (Myanmar) but is recognized as the legitimate representative of Burmese sailors by other maritime unions, and is affiliated with Confederation of Trade Unions, Myanmar and a member of the International Transport Workers' Federation.
