= Queuing Rule of Thumb =

Mathematical formula for queueing

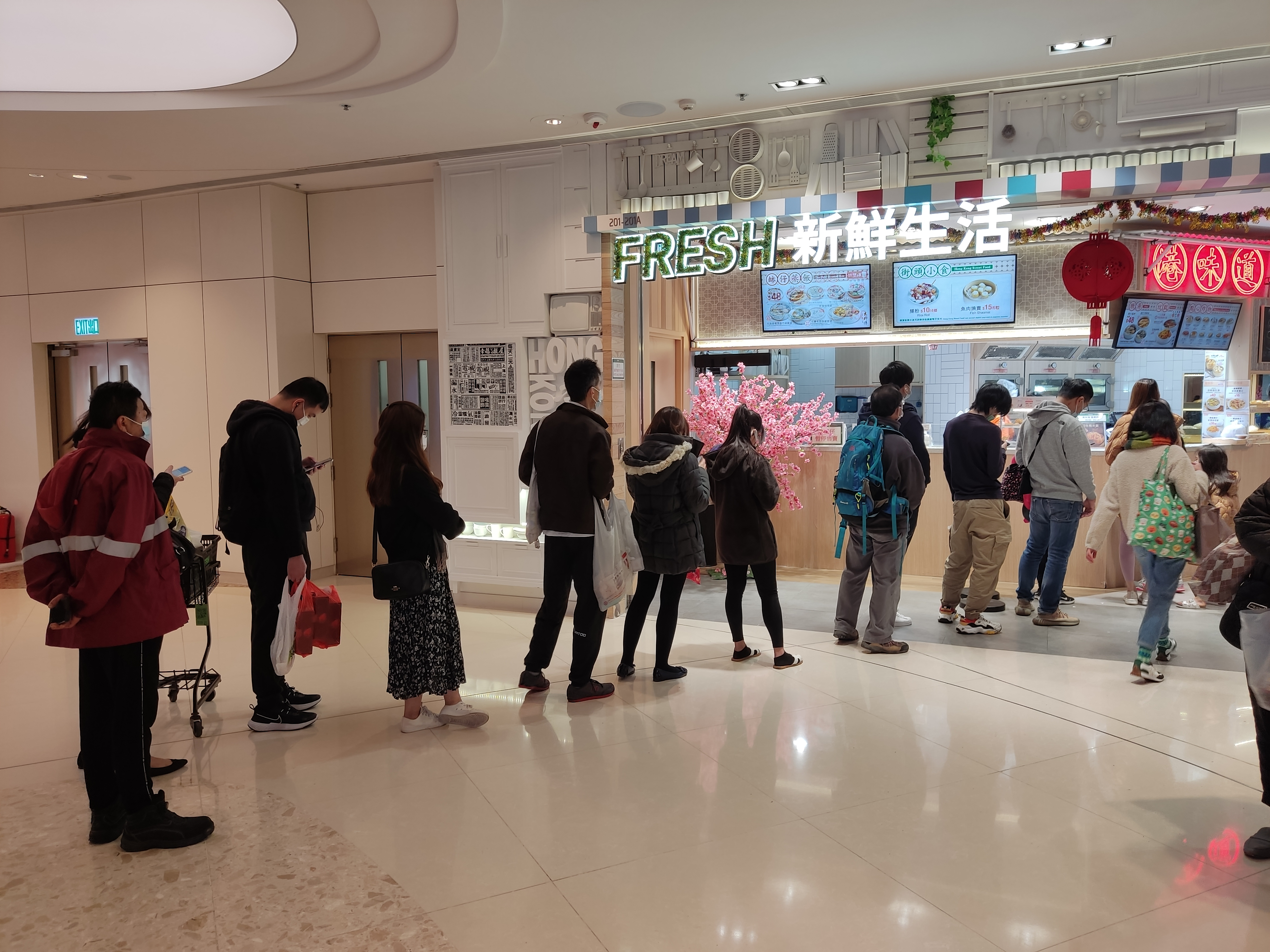
A queue for a fast food counter with a single server

The Queuing Rule of Thumb (QROT) is a mathematical formula known as the queuing constraint equation when it is used to find an approximation of servers required to service a queue. The formula is written as an inequality relating the number of servers (s), total number of service requestors (N), service time (r), and the maximum time to empty the queue (T):

$s>\frac{Nr}{T}$

QROT serves as a rough heuristic to address queue problems. Compared to standard queuing formulas, it is simple enough to compute the necessary number of servers without involving probability or queueing theory. The rule of thumb is therefore more practical to use in many situations.

== Formula ==
A derivation of the QROT formula follows. The arrival rate is the ratio of the total number of customers N and the maximum time needed to finish the queue T.

$$\lambda=\frac{N}{T}$$

The service rate is the reciprocal of service time r.

$$\mu=\frac{1}{r}$$

It is convenient to consider the ratio of the arrival rate and the service rate.

$$\rho=\frac{\lambda}{\mu}$$

Assuming s servers, the utilization of the queuing system must not be larger than 1.

$$U=\frac{\rho}{s}<1$$

Combining the first three equations gives $\rho=\frac{\lambda}{\mu}=\frac{Nr}{T}$. Combining this and the fourth equation yields $U=\frac{\rho}{s}=\frac{Nr}{Ts}<1$.

Simplifying, the formula for the Queuing Rule of Thumb is $s>\frac{Nr}{T}$.

== Usage ==
The Queuing Rule of Thumb assists queue management to resolve queue problems by relating the number of servers, the total number of customers, the service time, and the maximum time needed to finish the queue. To make a queuing system more efficient, these values can be adjusted with regards to the rule of thumb.

The following examples illustrate how the rule may be used.

=== Conference lunch ===
Conference lunches are usually self-service. Each serving table has 2 sides where people can pick up their food. If each of 1,000 attendees needs 45 seconds to do so, how many serving tables must be provided so that lunch can be served in an hour?

Solution: Given r = 45, N = 1000, T = 3600, we use the rule of thumb to get s: $s>\frac{Nr}{T}\Longrightarrow s>\frac{1000\times45}{3600}\Longrightarrow s>12.5$. There are two sides of the table that can be used. So the number of tables needed is $\frac{12.5}{2} = 6.25$. We round this up to a whole number since the number of servers must be discrete. Thus, 7 serving tables must be provided.

=== Student registration ===
A school of 10,000 students must set certain days for student registration. One working day is 8 hours. Each student needs about 36 seconds to be registered. How many days are needed to register all students?

Solution: Given s = 1, N = 10,000, r = 36, the rule of thumb yields T: $s>\frac{Nr}{T}\Longrightarrow T>\frac{Nr}{s}\Longrightarrow T>\frac{10,000\times36}{1}\Longrightarrow T>360,000$. Given the work hours for a day is 8 hours (28,800 seconds), the number of registration days needed is $\left\lceil\frac{360,000}{28,800}\right\rceil=13$ days.

=== Drop off ===
During the peak hour of the morning about 4500 cars drop off their children at an elementary school. Each drop-off requires about 60 seconds. Each car requires about 6 meters to stop and maneuver. How much space is needed for the minimum drop off line?

Solution: Given N = 4500, T = 60, r = 1, the rule of thumb yields s: $s>\frac{Nr}{T}\Longrightarrow s>\frac{4500\times1}{60}\Longrightarrow s>75$. Given the space for each car is 6 meters, the line should be at least $75\times6=450$ meters.

== See also ==
- Little's law
