= Maung Maung (disambiguation) =

Maung Maung is the name of:

- Maung Maung (1925-1994), 7th president of Myanmar.
- Phaungkaza Maung Maung (1763–1782), King of Burma for a week in 1782
- Maung Maung (union leader) (born 1952), Burmese trade union leader
- Maung Maung (1920–2009), Burmese diplomat, brigadier and author.
