= Substitute =

Substitute may refer to:

== Film ==
- Substitute (film), a 2006 film by Vikash Dhorasoo
- The Substitute (1993 film), a telefilm by Martin Donovan
- The Substitute, a 1996 thriller film starring Tom Berenger
- The Substitute 2: School's Out, a 1998 action-crime-thriller starring Treat Williams
- The Substitute 3: Winner Takes All, a 1999 action thriller starring Treat Williams
- The Substitute: Failure Is Not an Option, a 2001 action thriller starring Treat Williams
- The Substitute (2007 film), a Danish science fiction horror film
- The Substitute (2015 film), a short film
- The Substitute (2022 film), a 2022 film directed by Diego Lerman

== Politics ==
- Substitute (elections)

== Television ==
- "Substitute" (Beavis and Butt-Head), a 1996 episode
- "The Substitute" (Glee), a 2010 episode
- "The Substitute" (Lost), a 2010 episode
- "The Substitute" (Recess), a segment from a 1998 episode
- "The Substitute" (Saved by the Bell), a 1989 episode
- The Substitute (Chinese TV series), a 2015 Chinese thriller television series released on iQIYI
- The Substitute (American TV series), a 2019 American television series on Nickelodeon

== Music ==
- "Substitute" (The Righteous Brothers song), 1975
- "Substitute" (The Who song), 1966
- The Substitute (soundtrack), the soundtrack to the 1996 crime film

== Other ==
- Substitute (association football)
- Substitute (cricket)
- Substitute goods, in economics, a good that can be used instead of another
- Ersatz good, in economics, a substitute good, inferior in quality
- Substitute character, on keyboards, a control character used in the place of another character
- Substitute natural gas
- Substitute teacher, a temporary replacement in a teacher's absence

== See also ==
- Interchange (Australian rules football)
- Makeshift (disambiguation)
- Placeholder (disambiguation)
- Sub (disambiguation)
- Substitution (disambiguation)
