= Makeshift =

Makeshift may refer to:

- "Makeshift" (Death Note episode), an episode of the anime series Death Note
- Makeshift (Transformers), any of several Transformers characters
- Makeshift Miracle, a surreal fantasy coming-of-age webcomic

== See also ==
- Interim (disambiguation)
- Substitute (disambiguation)
