= Queue area =

Places where people queue or "line up" for goods or services

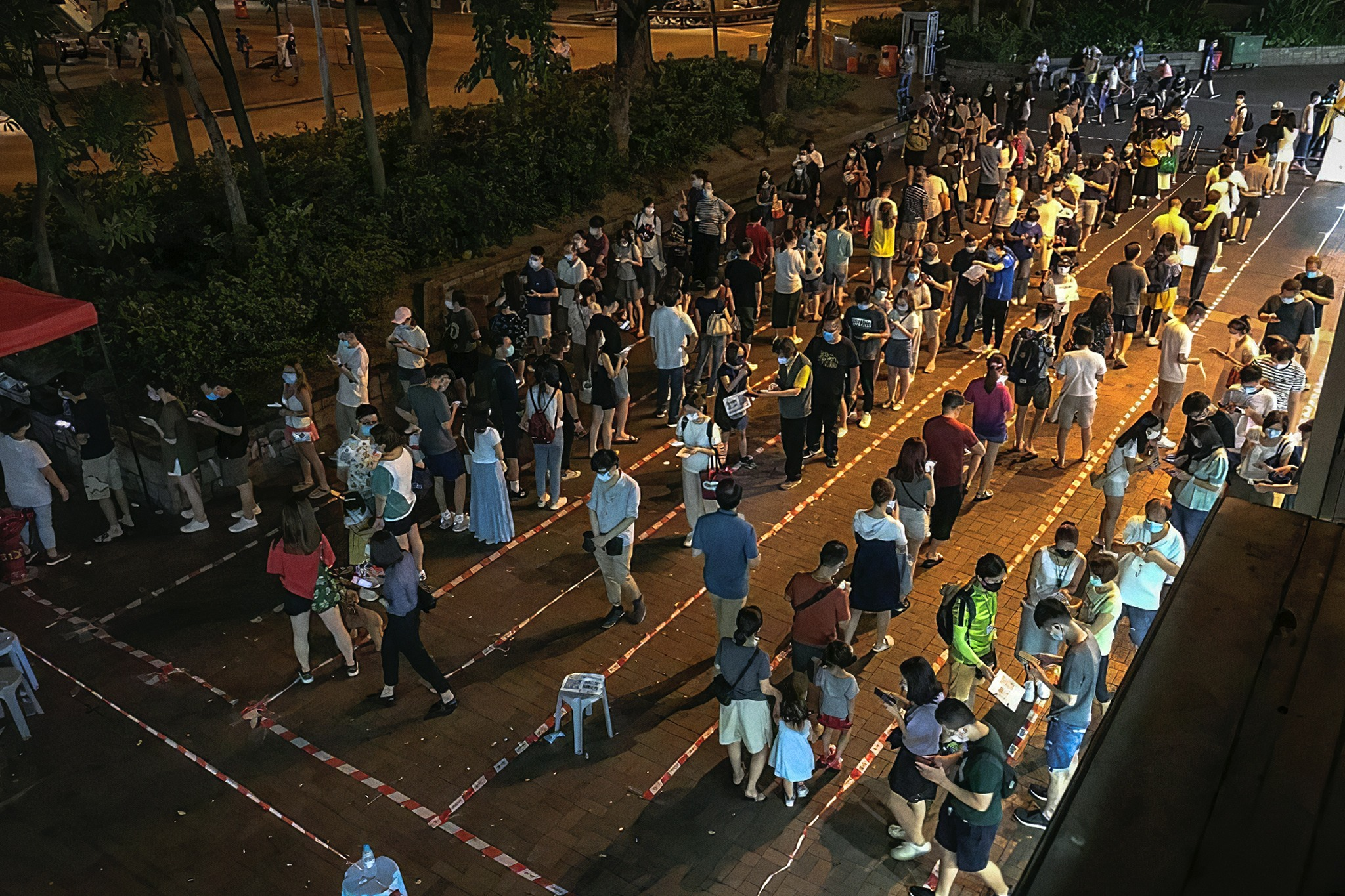
Voting queue in Hong Kong

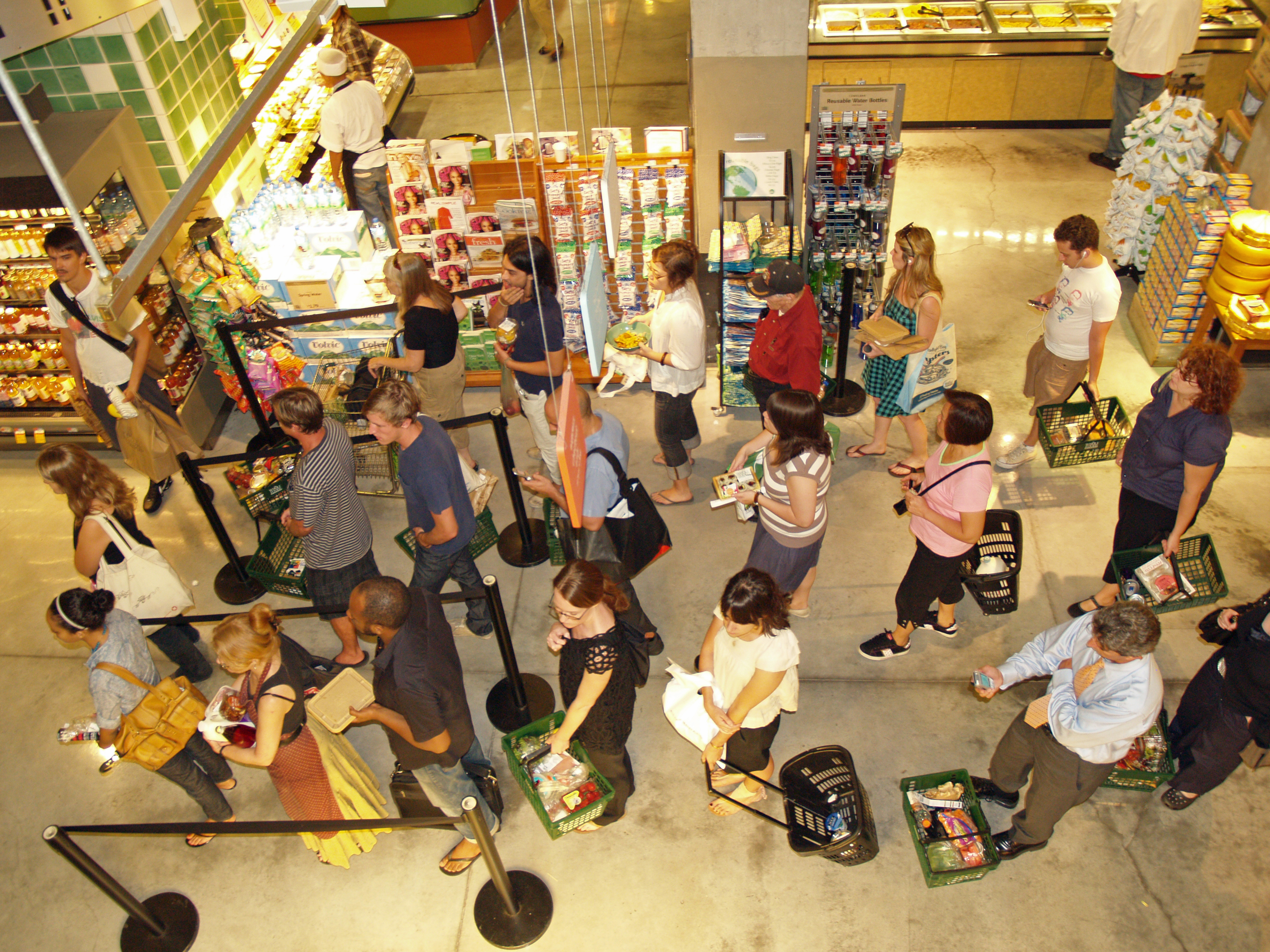
A queue area at a food store in New York City

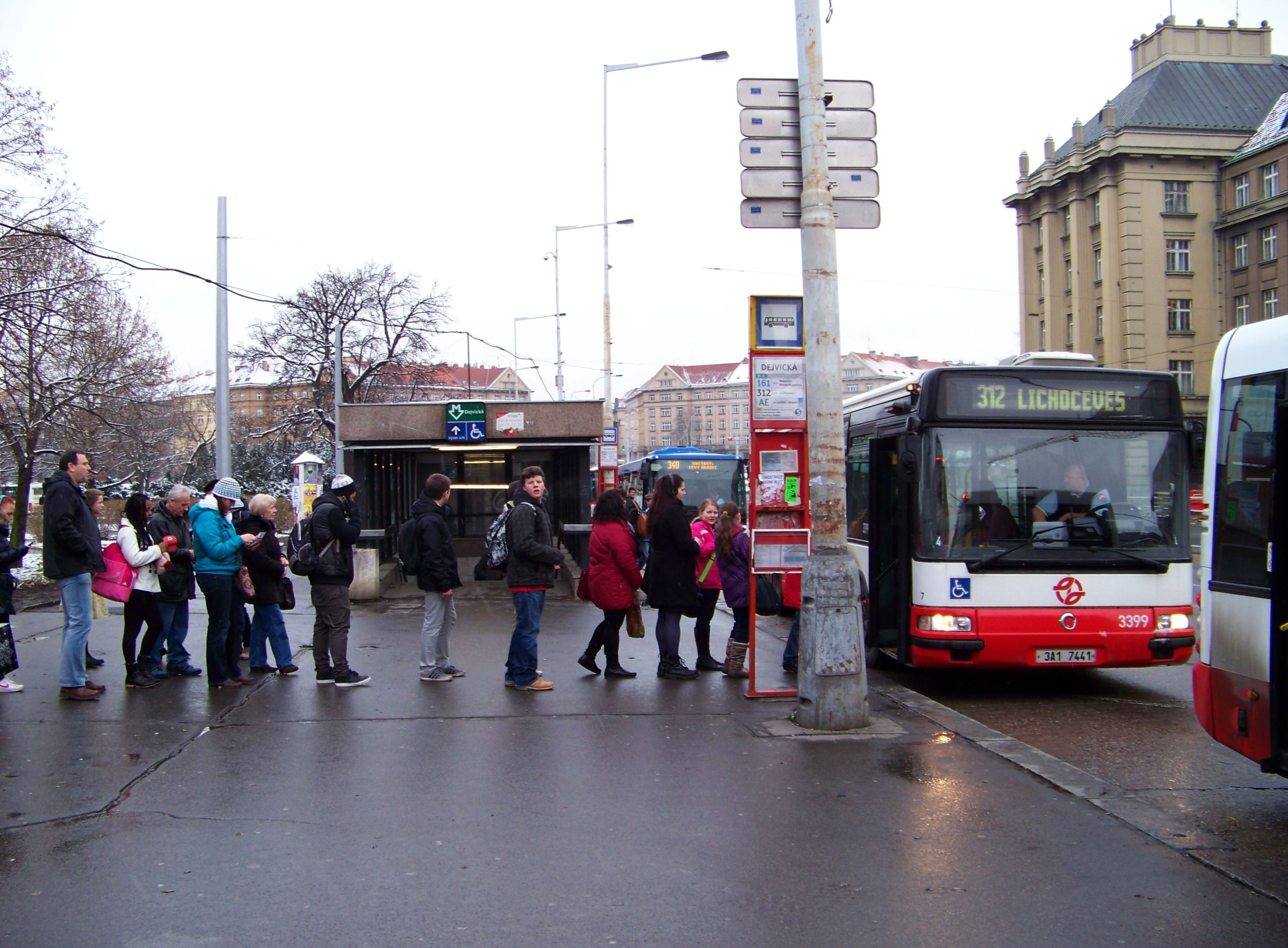
People lined up when boarding a suburban bus in Prague

Queue areas are places in which people queue (first-come, first-served) for goods or services. Such a group of people is known as a queue (British usage) or line (American usage), and the people are said to be waiting or standing in a queue or in line, (Note: In the New York area, the phrase on line is often used in place of in line.) respectively. Occasionally, both the British and American terms are combined to form the term "queue line".

Examples include checking out groceries or other goods with a cashier, at a self service shop, at an ATM, at a ticket desk, a city bus, or in a taxi stand.

Queueing is a phenomenon in a number of fields, and has been extensively analysed in the study of queueing theory. In economics, queueing is seen as one way to ration scarce goods and services.

== Types ==
=== Physical ===
==== History ====
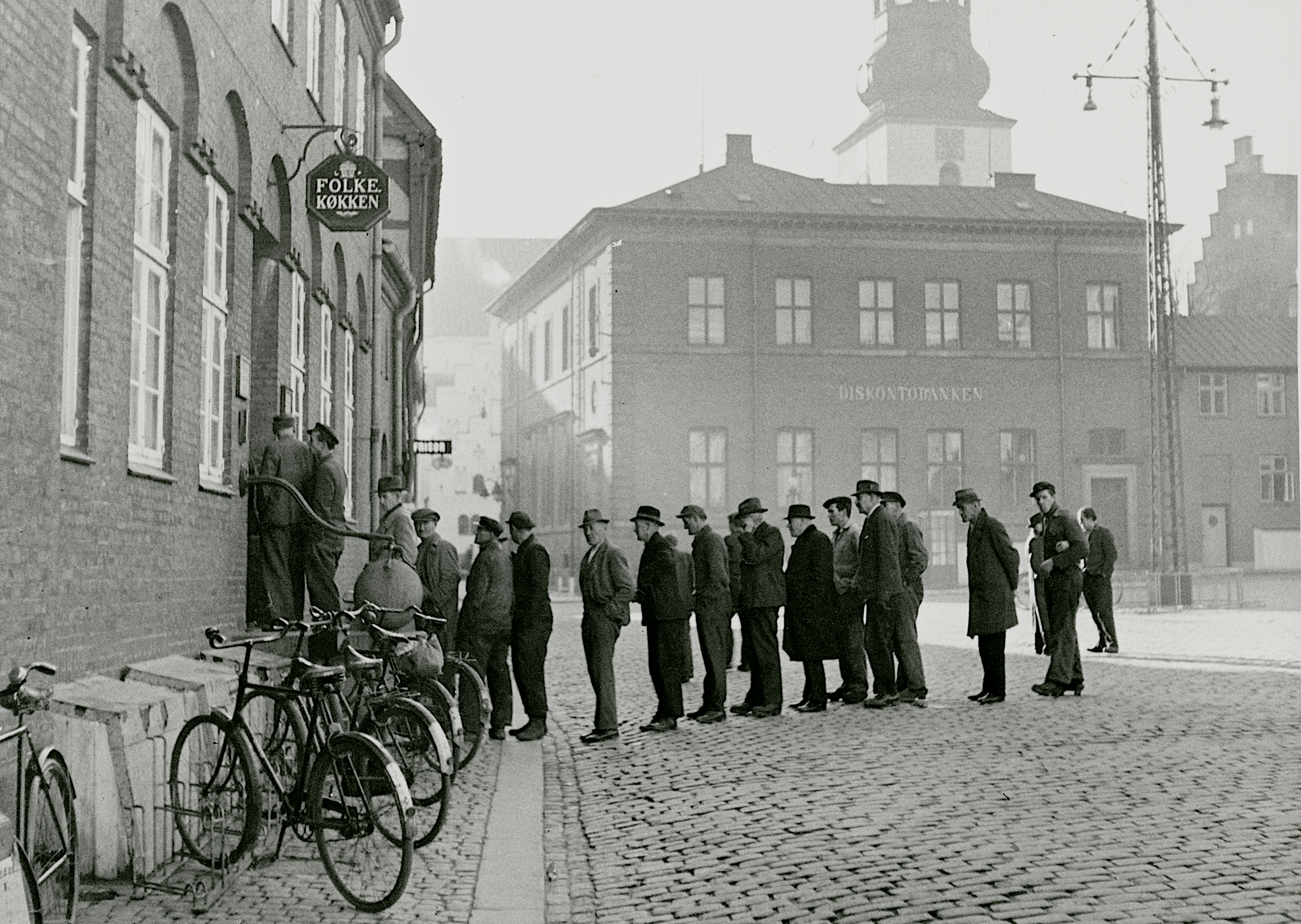
1943 soup kitchen queue in Aalborg, Denmark

The first written description of people standing in line is found in an 1837 book, The French Revolution: A History by Thomas Carlyle. Carlyle described what he thought was a strange sight: people standing in an orderly line to buy bread from bakers around Paris.

==== Typical applications ====
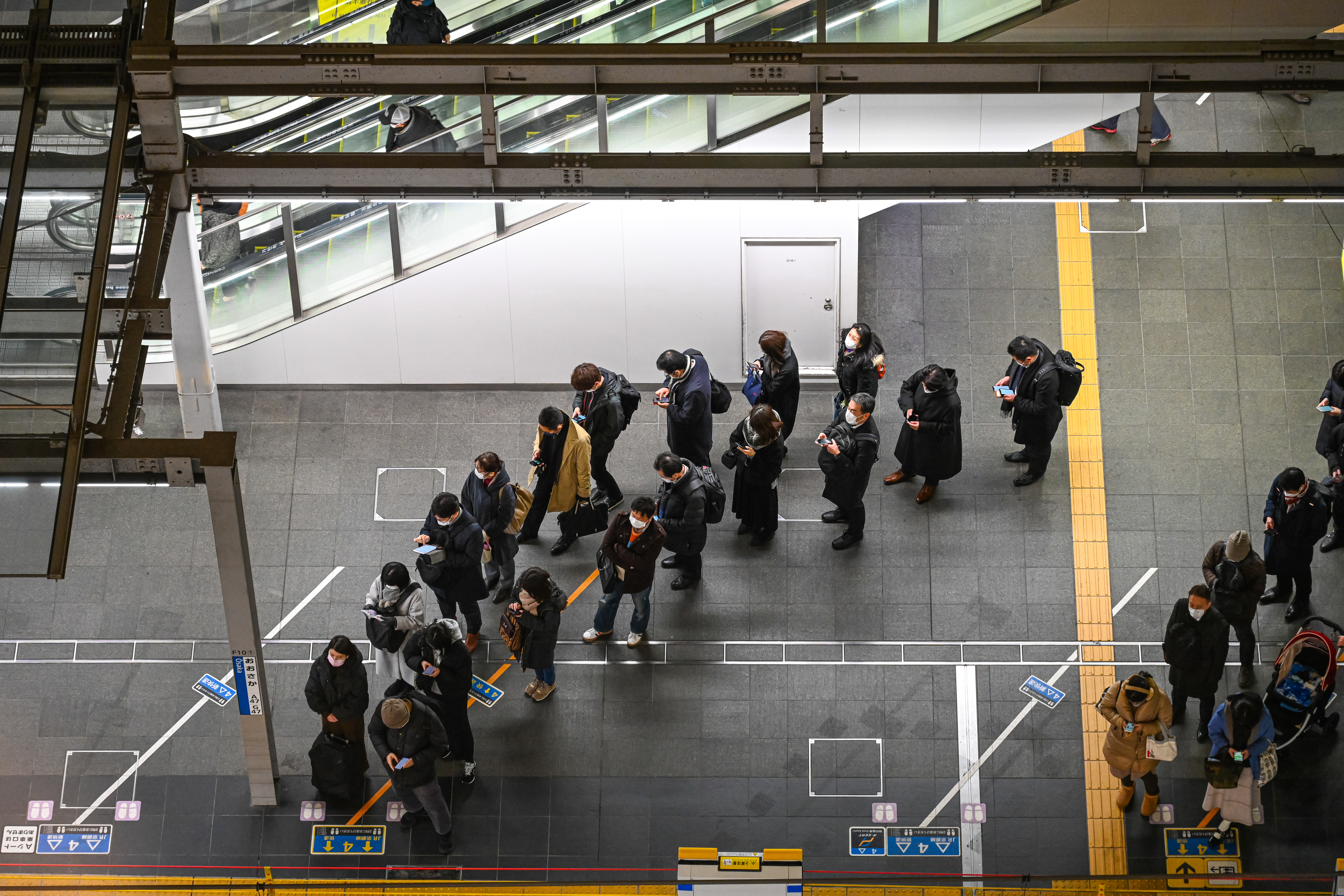
Commuters at Osaka Station waiting to board a train. Queues for specific trains are marked by color-coded lines on the platform.

Queues can be found in railway stations to book tickets, at bus stops for boarding and at temples.

Queues are generally found at transportation terminals where security screenings are conducted.

Large stores and supermarkets may have dozens of separate queues, but this can cause frustration, as different lines tend to be handled at different speeds; some people are served quickly, while others may wait for longer periods of time. Sometimes two people who are together split up and each waits in a different line; once it is determined which line is faster, the one in the slower line joins the other. Another arrangement is for everyone to wait in a single line; a person leaves the line each time a service point opens up. This is a common setup in banks and post offices.

Organized queue areas are commonly found at amusement parks. Each ride can accommodate a fixed number of guests that can be served at any given time (which is referred to as the ride's operational capacity), so there has to be some control over additional guests who are waiting. This led to the development of formalized queue areas—areas in which the lines of people waiting to board the rides are organized by railings, and may be given shelter from the elements with a roof over their heads, inside a climate-controlled building or with fans and misting devices. In some amusement parks – Disney theme parks being a prime example – queue areas can be elaborately decorated, with holding areas fostering anticipation, thus shortening the perceived wait for people in the queue by giving them something interesting to look at as they wait, or the perception that they have arrived at the threshold of the attraction.

==== Design ====
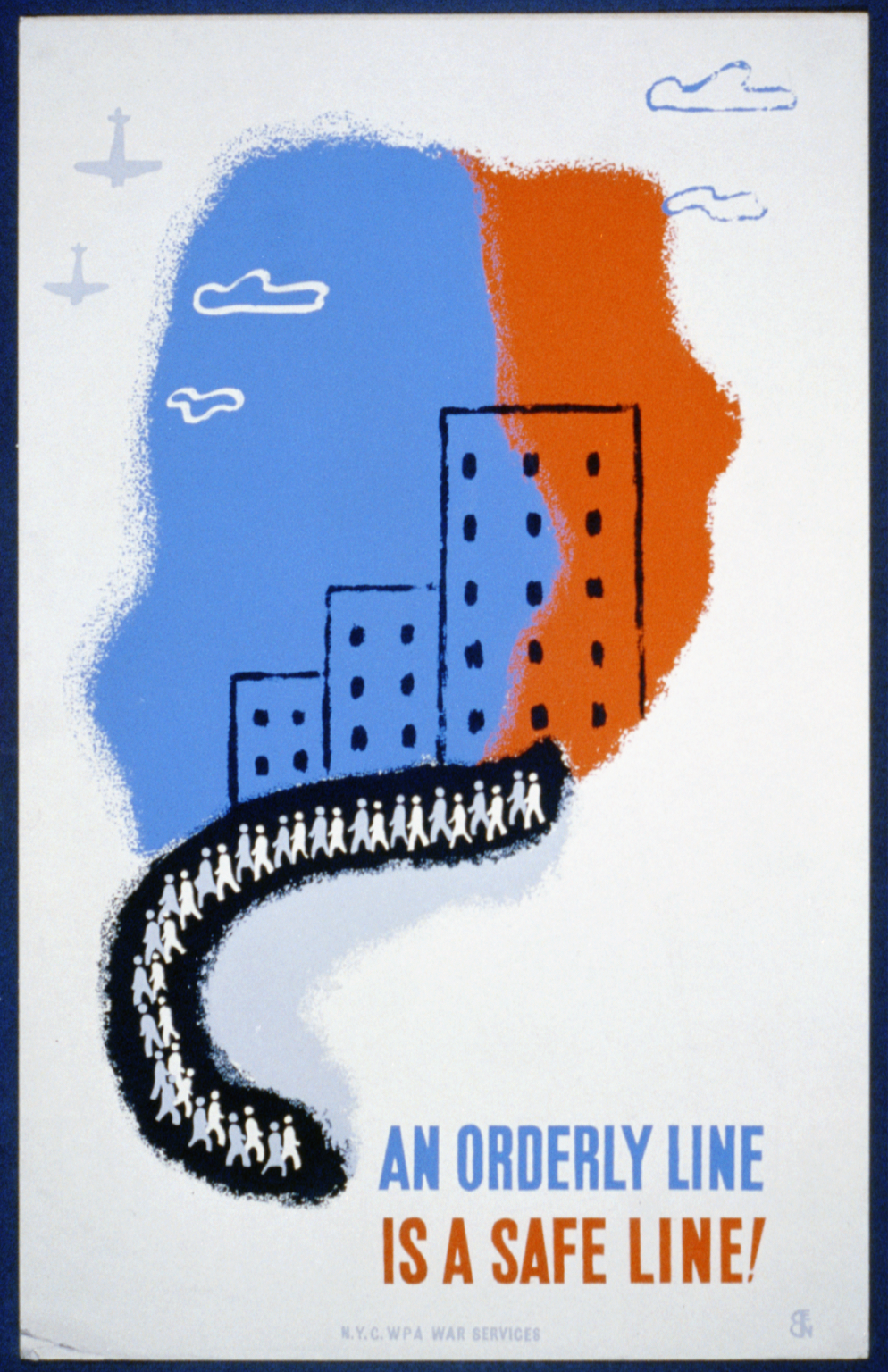
1940s poster promoting safety procedures during civil defense air raid drills

When designing queues, planners attempt to make the wait as pleasant and as simple as possible. They employ several strategies to achieve this, including:

- Expanding the capacity of the queue, thus allowing more patrons to have a place. This can be achieved by:
  - Increasing the width of the lanes within the queue
  - Increasing the length of the queue, sometimes by designing the line in a zig-zag shape that holds a large number of guests in a smaller area. This is used often at amusement parks. Notable rides have a large area of this kind of line to hold as many people as possible in line. Portions of the line can be sectioned off and bypassed by guests if the queue is not crowded.
- In-line entertainment can be added. This is popular at amusement parks like Walt Disney World, which uses video screens and other visuals to keep people in the queue area occupied.
- Secondary queue areas for patrons with special tickets, like the FastPass system used at Disney parks, or the Q-bot as used in Legoland Windsor.

==== Psychology ====
People experience "occupied" time as shorter than "unoccupied" time, and generally overestimate the amount of time waited by around 36%.

The technique of giving people an activity to distract them from a wait has been used to reduce complaints of delays at:

- Baggage claim in the Houston, Texas airport, by moving the arrival gates further away so passengers spend more time walking than standing around waiting
- Elevators, by adding mirrors so people can groom themselves or watch other people
- Retail checkout, by placing small items for purchase so customers can continue shopping while waiting

Other techniques to reduce queueing anxiety include:

- Hiding the length of a line by wrapping it around a corner.
- Having only one line, so there is no anxiety about which line to choose and a greater sense of fairness. Even though the average wait over time is the same, customers tend to notice lines that are moving faster than they are compared to other lines moving more slowly.
- Putting up signs that deliberately overestimate the wait time, to always exceed customer expectations.

Cutting in line, also known as queue-jumping, can generate a strong negative response, depending on the local cultural norms.

=== Virtual ===
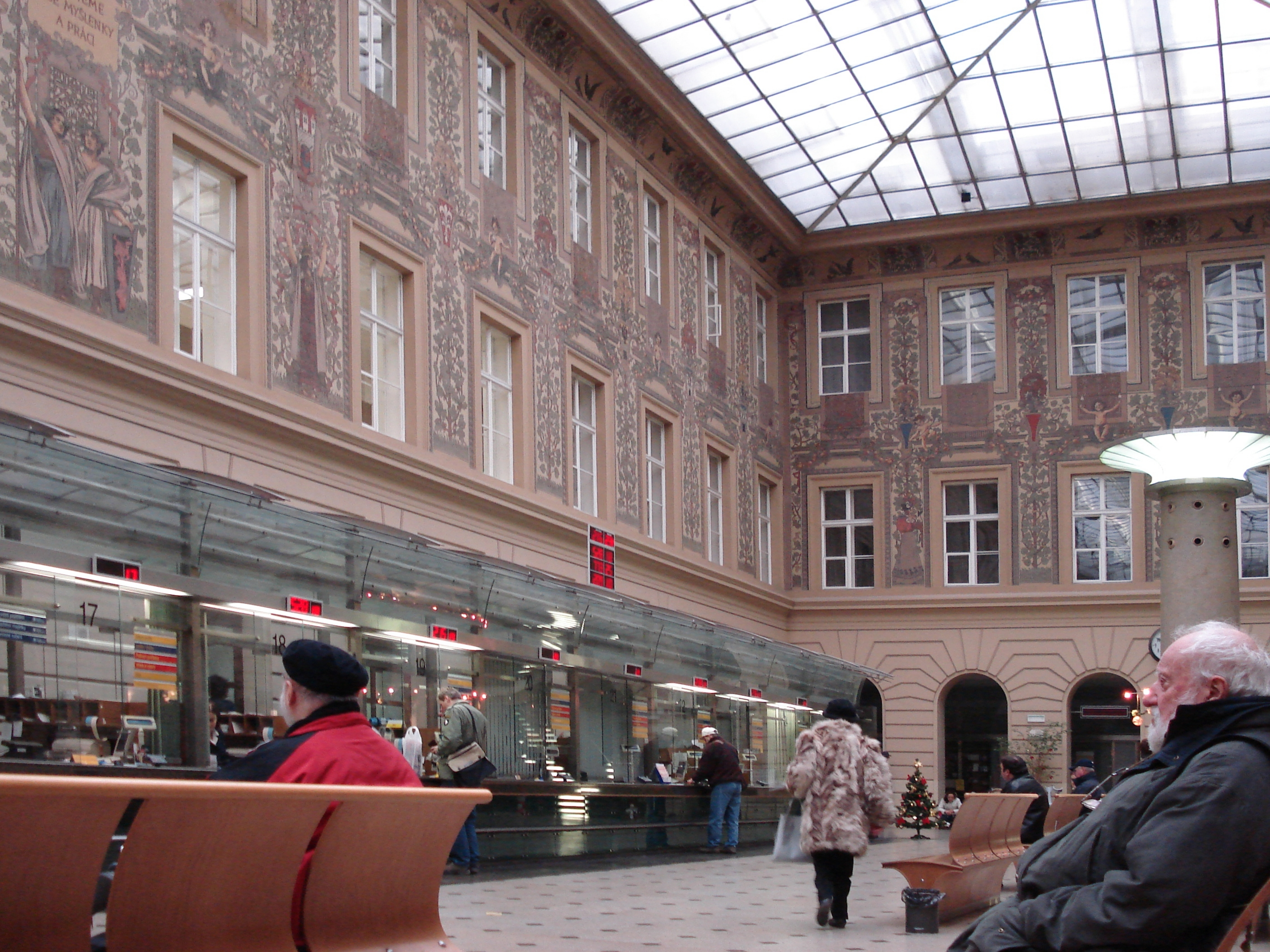
Waiting queue call system in the Prague main post office. People have numbered tickets from a machine and are waiting until their number appears on a display.

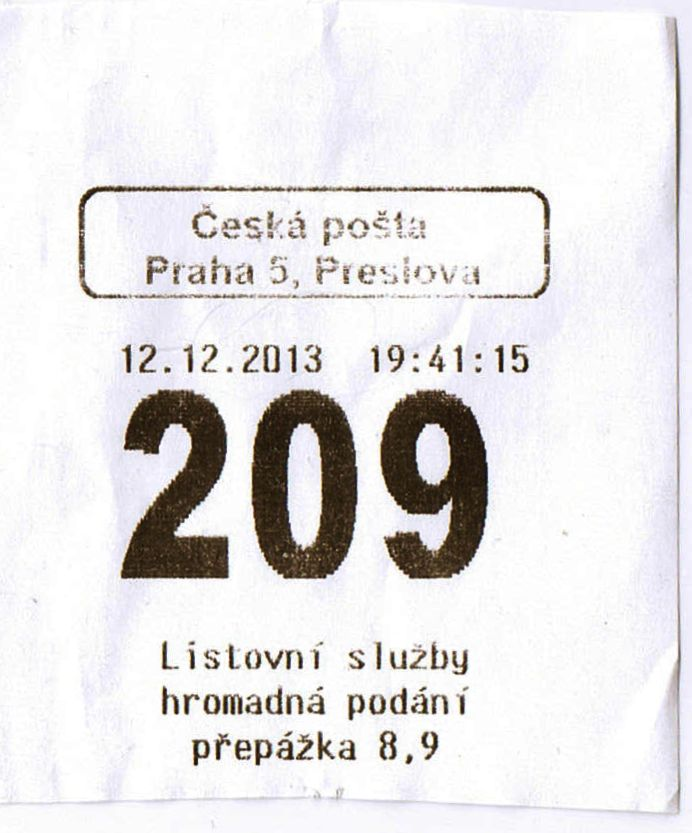
Waiting number ticket from the main post office of Prague 5 district, Czech Republic. The tickets contains the specification "Letter services – mass submits" and shows that counters 8 and 9 deal with such.

Physical queueing is sometimes replaced by virtual queueing. In a waiting room there may be a system whereby the queuer asks and remembers where their place is in the queue, or reports to a desk and signs in, or takes a ticket with a number from a machine. These queues typically are found at doctors' offices, hospitals, town halls, social security offices, labor exchanges, the Department of Motor Vehicles, the immigration departments, free internet access in the state or council libraries, banks or post offices and call centres. Especially in the United Kingdom, tickets are taken to form a virtual queue at delicatessens and children's shoe shops. In some countries such as Sweden, virtual queues are also common in shops and railway stations. A display sometimes shows the number that was last called for service.

Restaurants have come to employ virtual queueing techniques with the availability of application-specific pagers, which alert those waiting that they should report to the host to be seated. Another option used at restaurants is to assign customers a confirmed return time, basically a reservation issued on arrival.

Virtual queueing apps are available that allow the customers to view the virtual queue status of a business and they can take virtual queue numbers remotely. The app can be used to get updates of the virtual queue status that the customer is in.

==== Alternate activities ====
A substitute or alternative activity may be provided for people to participate in while waiting to be called, which reduces the perceived waiting time and the probability that the customer will abort their visit. For example, a busy restaurant might seat waiting customers a bar. An outdoor attraction with long virtual queues might have a side marquee selling merchandise or food. The alternate activity may provide the organisation with an opportunity to generate additional revenue from the waiting customers.

=== Mobile ===
All of the above methods, however, suffer from the same drawback: the person arrives at the location only to find out that they need to wait. Recently, queues at DMVs, colleges, restaurants, healthcare institutions, government offices and elsewhere have begun to be replaced by mobile queues or queue-ahead, whereby the person queuing uses their phone, the internet, a kiosk or another method to enter a virtual queue, optionally prior to arrival, is free to roam during the wait, and then gets paged at their mobile phone when their turn approaches. This has the advantage of allowing users to find out the wait forecast and get in the queue before arriving, roaming freely and then timing their arrival to the availability of service. This has been shown to extend the patience of those in the queue and reduce no-shows.

== See also ==
- Cutting in line
- Call centre
- Line stander
- Queuing Rule of Thumb
- Waiting room
