= Cutting in line =

To invalidly enter a line by going in any position other than the back

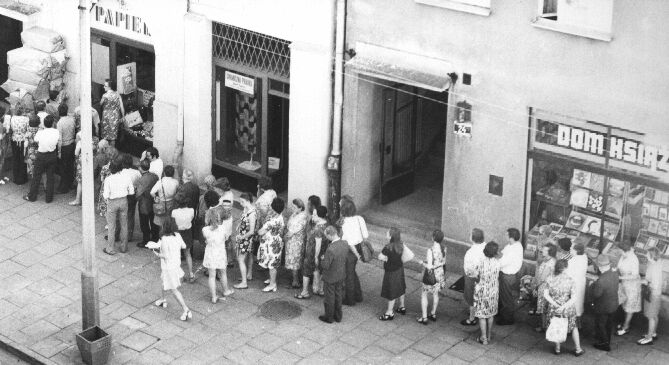
A queue on an open sidewalk in Poland

Cutting in line (American English) or queue jumping (British English) (Note: The different American and British names for the infraction reflect the different names for the layout. There are many less common, colloquial, or regional names for the infraction, including butting, barging, budging, bunking, skipping, breaking, ditching, shorting, pushing in, and cutsies) is the act of entering a queue or line of people at any position other than the back. Queue jumping also encompasses cutting ahead, wherein one of those already in a queue moves past some of the others to a position nearer the front of the queue. These practices are generally deprecated as a violation of the first come, first served policy under which queues are expected to operate. Where a queue comprises groups of people rather than individuals, there may be some toleration for a latecomer joining friends or family in the middle of the queue.

== Reaction ==
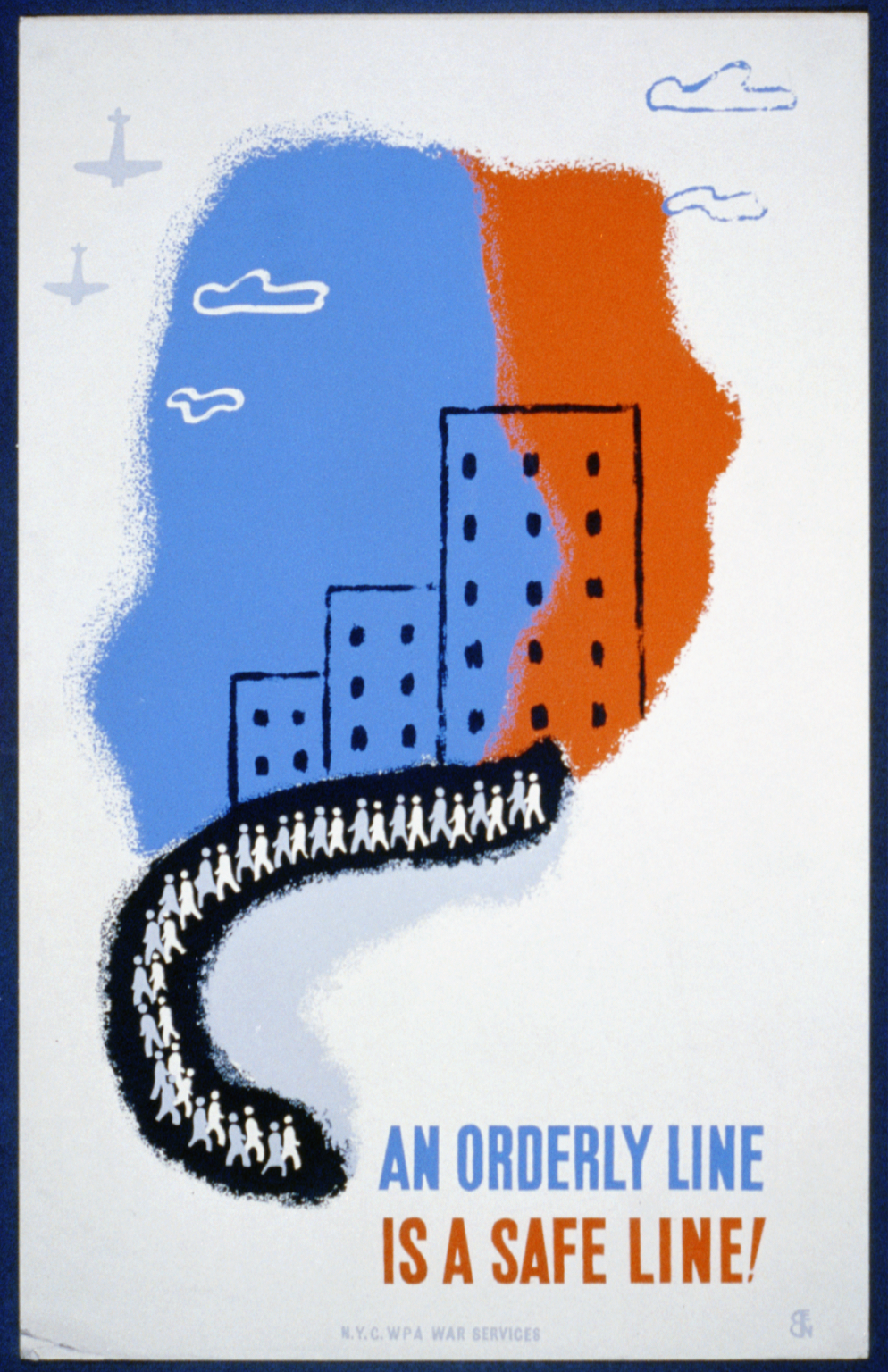
1940s poster promoting safety procedures during civil defense air raid drills

One is expected to wait one's turn in a queue, unless there is a good reason to cut ahead. According to one study, a person cutting in line has a 54% chance that others in the line will object. With two people cutting in line, there is a 91.3% chance that someone will object. The proportion of people objecting from anywhere behind the cutter is 73.3%, with the person immediately behind the point of intrusion objecting most frequently.

Nevertheless, physical altercation resulting from cutting is rare. It was reported that an 18-year-old National Serviceman in Malaysia was bludgeoned to death after he attempted to jump the queue at a food counter. Another incident occurred in New York City at The Halal Guys food cart, resulting in the death of the man who cut in line. The man who killed him was charged with murder in the second degree.

Legislators in the US state of Washington passed a bill that makes cutting in line to catch a ferry illegal. Cutters can be fined $101 and forced to return to the end of the line.

In 2022, Holly Willoughby and Phillip Schofield drew criticism from social media and the press for bypassing the public queue for the lying-in-state of Elizabeth II, when filming for a television segment in London's Westminster Hall.

== Merging on roads ==
Cutting is present on roadways, especially restricted access highways, where traffic queues build up at merge locations. Drivers who bypass waiting until the last possible moment before merging are sometimes considered to be "cutters," and are frequent instigators of road rage. This behavior is not usually illegal in the US, unless the driver crosses a solid white line or uses dangerous merging techniques.

In contrast, not using the merging lane until the last moment is required by law in Germany, Austria and Belgium; legal use of the lane is when two lanes merge into one and with traffic speed slowed down. Where construction zones close a lane, parts of Canada and the U.S. encourage the "zipper" method of merging, which was introduced in 2002 by the Minnesota Department of Transportation. The zipper method can reduce congestion up to 40%, while also giving drivers plenty of adjustment time for the merge and reducing the speed differential between the open lane and the lane with the upcoming closure.

== Sanctioned line cutting ==
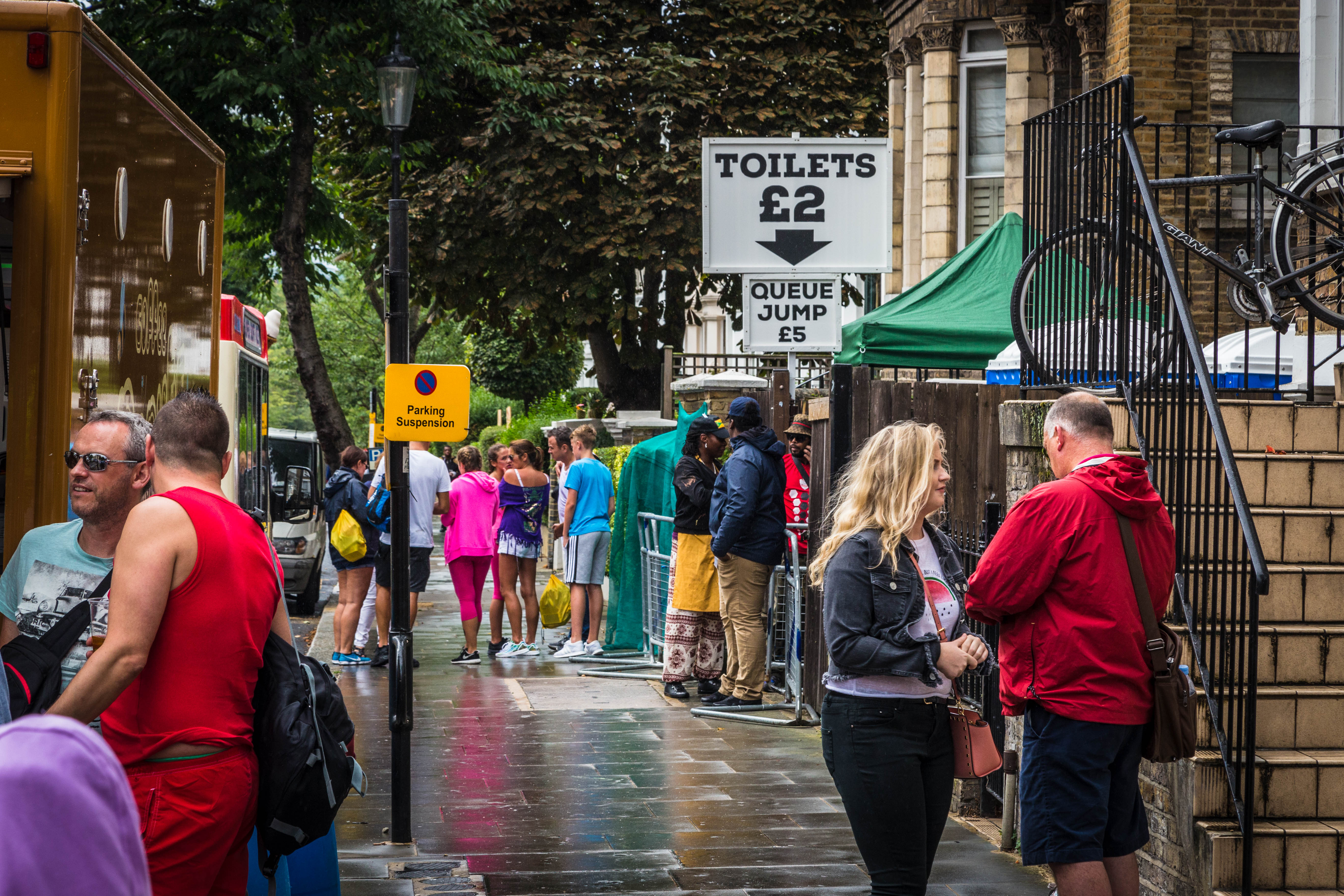
Sign at Notting Hill Carnival offering a "queue jump" for toilet facilities, for a fee

=== Amusement parks ===
In some instances, cutting in line is sanctioned by the authority overseeing the queue. For example, amusement park operators such as Six Flags (Fast Lane), and Walt Disney (FastPass) have virtual queue programs whereby a limited number of patrons cut the line for an attraction by arriving at a pre-designated time (sometimes, but not always, associated with a payment for the privilege). Common penalties for cutting the line without this privilege range from being forced to the back of the line to removal from the premises.

=== Airports ===
At airports, it is customary – for the sake of efficiency – to allow pregnant women, adults accompanying small children, the elderly and the physically disabled to board an airplane first, regardless of their seat, class or assignment. However, the priority afforded wheelchair-using passengers has reportedly given rise to a practice in the United States, whereby some passengers who do not normally use a wheelchair request one, to pass through security checks quickly and to be among the first to board an aircraft. At the conclusion of the flight, these passengers walk off the aircraft, instead of waiting for a wheelchair and thus being among the last to disembark. The neologism "miracle flight" has been coined to describe this behavior, as passengers apparently needing a wheelchair before boarding the aircraft are "miraculously" able to walk afterwards.

In the United States, Clear Secure allows its subscribers to skip to the front of TSA lines for a fee. This has garnered criticism, including in California, where a 2024 bill aims to prevent this line-cutting mechanism. The bill would allow Clear to operate separate security lines, but would no longer allow its subscribers to cut the general security lines.

== See also ==
- Cutting in, an act of taking a dance partner
- Line stander
