= Spacing (typography) =

In typography, spacing is an important design and layout element, involving letters, words, sentences, and lines.

== Letter spacing ==
Docent sights juggernaut
Headline set tight with minus letter spacing
Docent sights juggernaut
Headline set with no additional letter spacing
Docent sights juggernaut
Headline with more open letter spacing
Docent sights juggernaut
Headline with open letter spacing similar to metal type
Docent sights juggernaut
Headline with still more letter spacing
Docent sights juggernaut
Headline with wide letter spacing
Docent sights juggernaut
Headline with wider letter spacing, sometimes used for broadcast

Examples of headline letter spacing

Letter spacing, character spacing or tracking is an optically consistent typographical adjustment to the space between letters to change the visual density of a line or block of text. Letter spacing is distinct from kerning, which adjusts the spacing of particular pairs of adjacent characters such as "7." which would appear to be badly spaced if left unadjusted, and leading, the spacing between lines.

== Word spacing ==
Word spacing in typography is space between words, as contrasted with letter-spacing (space between letters of words) and sentence spacing (space between sentences). Typographers may modify the spacing of letters or words in a body of type to aid readability and copy fit, or for aesthetic effect. In web browsers and standardized digital typography, word spacing is controlled by the CSS1 word-spacing property.

== Sentence spacing ==
Sentence spacing concerns how spaces are inserted between sentences in typeset text and is a matter of typographical convention. Since the introduction of movable-type printing in Europe, various sentence spacing conventions have been used in languages with a Latin alphabet. These include a normal word space (as between the words in a sentence), a single enlarged space, and two full spaces.

Until the 20th century, publishing houses and printers in many countries used additional space between sentences. There were exceptions to this traditional spacing method – some printers used spacing between sentences that was no wider than word spacing. This was French spacing, synonymous with single-space sentence spacing until the late 20th century. With the introduction of the typewriter in the late 19th century, typists used two spaces between sentences to mimic the style used by traditional typesetters. While wide sentence spacing was phased out in the printing industry in the mid-20th century, the practice continued on typewriters and later on computers. Perhaps because of this, many modern sources now incorrectly claim that wide spacing was created for the typewriter.

The desired or correct sentence spacing is often debated, but most sources now state that an additional space is not necessary or desirable. From around 1950, single sentence spacing became standard in books, magazines, and newspapers, and the majority of style guides that use a Latin-derived alphabet as a language base now prescribe or recommend the use of a single space after the concluding punctuation of a sentence. However, some sources still state that additional spacing is correct or acceptable. Some people prefer double sentence spacing because that was how they were taught to type. The few direct studies conducted since 2002 have produced inconclusive results as to which convention is more readable.

== Line spacing ==
In typography, leading (/ˈlɛdɪŋ/ LED-ing) is the space between adjacent lines of type; the exact definition varies.

In hand typesetting, leading is the thin strips of lead (or aluminium) that were inserted between lines of type in the composing stick to increase the vertical distance between them. The thickness of the strip is called leading and is equal to the difference between the size of the type and the distance from one baseline to the next. For instance, given a type size of 10 points and a distance between baselines of 12 points, the leading would be 2 points. This combination of type size and distance between baselines is described as "10 on 12 pt", which may appear in a book's colophon as "Typeset in 10 on 12 pt Times Roman", or similar.

The term is still used in modern page-layout software such as QuarkXPress, the Affinity Suite, and Adobe InDesign. Consumer-oriented word-processing software often talks of line spacing or, more accurately, interline spacing.

== See also ==
- Space (punctuation)
- French spacing
