= Filer (surname) =

Filer is a surname. Notable people with the surname include:

- Lee Filer (born 1980), American politician
- Mike Filer (born 1990), Canadian football player
- Nathan Filer, British writer
- Randall K. Filer (born 1952), American economist
- Rodney Filer (born 1974), American arena football player
- Tom Filer (born 1956), American baseball player
