= Substitution =

Substitution may refer to:

== Arts and media ==
- Substitution (poetry), a variation in poetic scansion
- Substitution (theatre), an acting methodology

=== Music ===
- Chord substitution, swapping one chord for a related one within a chord progression
- Tritone substitution, reinterpreting a chord via a new root note located an augmented fourth or diminished fifth distant from the root of the original interpretation
- "Substitution" (Silversun Pickups song), 2009
- "Substitution" (Purple Disco Machine and Kungs song), 2023

== Science and mathematics ==
=== Biology and chemistry ===
- Base-pair substitution or point mutation, a type of mutation
- Substitution reaction, where a functional group in a chemical compound is replaced by another group
  - Substituent, the atom or atoms that replaces those of the reactant
- Substitution, a process in which an allele arises and undergoes fixation

=== Mathematics and computing ===
- Substitution (algebra), replacing occurrences of some symbol by a given value
- Substitution (logic), a syntactic transformation on strings of symbols of a formal language
- String substitution, a mapping of letters in an alphabet to languages
- Substitution of a character in a string, one of the single-character edits used to define the Levenshtein distance
- Substitution cipher, a method of encryption
- Integration by substitution, a method for finding antiderivatives and integrals

=== Other uses in science ===
- Substitution (economics), switching between alternative consumable goods as their relative prices change
- Attribute substitution, a psychological process thought to underlie a number of cognitive biases and perceptual illusions
- Substitution method, a method of measuring the transmission loss of an optical fiber

== Other uses ==
- Substitution (law), the replacement of a judge
- Substitution (sport), where a sports team is able to change one player for another during a match
- Substitution therapy or opiate replacement therapy
- Import substitution industrialization, a trade and economic policy
- Penal substitution, a theory of the atonement within Christian theology
- Simultaneous substitution, a practice requiring Canadian television distribution companies to substitute a non-local station signal with the local signal

== Within Wikipedia ==
- Help:Substitution, help performing substitution on Wikipedia pages
- Special:ExpandTemplates, page that shows what will result from substitution
- Wikipedia:Substitution, where, when, how, and what about using substitution on Wikipedia

== See also ==
- Substitute (disambiguation)
