= .sub =

.sub may refer to:

- MicroDVD Subtitle File, a file that contains subtitle (captioning) data for a movie or video clip
- Subchannel Data File, a file that can be a part of CloneCD image files; see CloneCD Control File
- DirectVobSub Subtitle File, a binary file that contains subtitles (captioning) data for a movie or video clip
