= Submarine (disambiguation) =

A submarine is a specialized warship that can operate underwater.

Submarine may also refer to:

- Underwater, when this means "under the sea"

== Film ==
- Submarine films, a war film genre
- Submarine (1928 film), an American film directed by Frank Capra
- Submarine (2010 film), a British film directed by Richard Ayoade
  - Submarine (EP), the soundtrack for the 2010 film, written by Alex Turner

== Literature ==
- "Submarines" (poem), a 1917 poem and song by Rudyard Kipling
- Submarine (Clancy book), a 1993 non-fiction book by Tom Clancy
- Submarine (novel), a 2008 novel by Joe Dunthorne, adapted into the 2010 film

== Music ==
- Submarine (band), the UK band
- The Submarines, an American indie rock band on Nettwerk
- Submarine (Whipping Boy album), the 1992 debut album of Whipping Boy
- Submarine (The Marías album), 2024

=== Songs ===
- "Submarines" (Elgar)
- "Submarines" (The Lumineers song), a song from The Lumineers's 2012 album The Lumineers
- "Submarine" (Feeder song), from Black/Red, 2024
- "Submarine", a song by Godley & Creme
- "Submarine", a song by Genesis from Genesis Archive 2: 1976–1992
- "Submarine", a song from Björk's 2004 album Medúlla
- "Submarine", a song from the Drums' 2009 EP Summertime!
- "Submarine", a song by Kid Cudi from the 2025 album Free

== Other uses ==
- Submarine sandwich
- Submarine (wargame), a board wargame published 1976
- Submarine (arcade game), a 1979 mechanical arcade game
- Submarine (baseball), a way of pitching the ball

== See also ==
- Semisub
- Submersible boat
- Sub (disambiguation)
