= Maung Maung (union leader) =

Burmese trade unionist

Maung Maung (Burmese: မောင်မောင်; born 2 October 1952) is a Burmese trade unionist. During his studies, he earned a Bachelor of Science in geology.

== National Council of the Union of Burma ==
Maung Maung, General Secretary of the National Council of the Union of Burma (NCUB), is a key leader in the Burmese pro-democracy movement. Working from the Thai-Burmese border, Maung Maung coordinates the efforts of a broad coalition of pro-democracy groups, including the Members of Parliament Union (MPU), National League for Democracy-Liberated Area (NLD-LA), National Democratic Front (NDF), and Democratic Alliance of Burma (DAB).

Since 1990, the NCUB has led efforts to coordinate and plan for a democratic future for Burma. Maung Maung’s is involved in a participatory constitution-drafting process, including groups inside and outside Burma. With a democratic transition on Burma’s horizon, Maung Maung has begun to press even harder for democratic reform to ensure that the transition is smooth and peaceful. He continues to call for international support and encourages the activists in Burma to keep the peace as well as keep strong in their fight for democracy.

The NCUB and its constituent organizations and allies have steadily built upon their successes, and, coordinating through Maung Maung, are continuing to direct significant pressure against the Burmese junta that will allow for the restoration of democracy in their country. The NCUB continues to bring together pro-democracy groups and leaders to strategize about how best to prepare for Burma’s transition. Maung Maung and other pro-democracy leaders are ready to lead the people of Burma into a democratic future.

== Federation of Trade Unions of Burma ==
In addition to his elected position in the NCUB, Maung Maung serves as the General Secretary of the Federation of Trade Unions of Burma (FTUB), an organization that builds trade unions and advances worker rights in Burma. The FTUB consists of various affiliated unions, including the All Burma Mining Union, the Seafarers Union of Burma (also affiliated with the ITF), the Textile Workers Union, and the Health, Education and Social Workers Union. The FTUB strongly supports the restoration of democracy in Burma and Aung San Suu Kyi’s National League for Democracy, whose party won the 1990 elections in Burma and which has been denied the right to form a parliamentary government by the ruling military junta.

Maung Maung is recognized by trade unions and human rights advocates throughout the world as the foremost expert and authority on labor rights in Burma. He is regularly invited by the workers’ delegations and various countries (including the United States) to attend and present evidence at ILO conferences and conventions.

- 1988—Maung Maung was the founding member of the Myanmar Gems Mining Union and then in a coalition was elected as the President of the All Burma Mining Union (Rangoon). Maung Maung was on the streets with the union which was a part of the civil service demonstrations that brought the regime to a standstill. For his involvement in the anti-regime demonstrations, on 14 November 1988 he was fired from his job with the government. The military intelligence came to arrest him and he left the country, leaving his wife and 3-year-old son behind.
- 1991—Maung Maung co-founded the Federation of Trade Unions of Burma (FTUB) from exile in Thailand. Under Maung Maung’s determined leadership, the FTUB has sought a number of international remedies to the problems of workers in Burma.
- 1992 — The FTUB wrote to Guy Ryder then the General Secretary of the ICFTU. After some discussions, Brother Dan Gallin the General Secretary of the IUF came to Bangkok to meet with FTUB. Then the IUF brought FTUB to the ILO annual Conference where through the IUF slot, the deteriorating working conditions in Burma to the attention of the International Labor Union (ILO) and through the years convinced the ILO to open an office in Rangoon.
- 1996 September FTUB and four plaintiffs filed suit applying the Alien Torts Claim Act against the offshore mining activities of UNOCAL, TOTAL FINA and PTTEP at the 9th Circuit Federal Court in the USA. FTUB was helped in this by John Osolnick then Dir of AFFLI Thailand, who introduced FTUB to Douglas Steele who did the initial research for the ATC as student of law. Phil Robertson did the initial write ups. Terry Collingsworth of the ILRF, Edward Gleason, Earl Brown. Of the two approaches, the Alien Tort Claims Act and the Class Action Act - it was FTUB / Douglas Steele who dug up this and stuck to this approach. The case was ground breaking, many expressed FTUB as ambulance chasing but after nine years, UNOCAl asked for a settlement.

== Protest against the military regime ==
On two notable occasions, the Burmese people have taken to the streets to protest the military regime, which, in turn, sparked the regime to crack down violently and kill thousands of peaceful demonstrators. As a tireless advocate for democracy, Maung Maung participated in or actively supported both protests. During the 1988 protests, Maung Maung led a union of miners through the streets to protest the military regime. On account of his pro-democracy activities and his leadership during the protests, he was forced to take pension and later left Burma in 1988, and has been separated from his wife, son, father, and sisters ever since.

During the August–September 2007 protests, Maung Maung worked from the Thai–Burmese border to coordinate efforts by NCUB and FTUB with key pro-democracy groups, provide logistical support to protest leaders, and lead protest communication efforts with media outlets and foreign governments.

== Awards ==
- Lane Kirkland Human Rights Award in 2001, awarded by the AFL-CIO, in recognition of Maung Maung’s support for workers’ rights.
- In 2005, the San Francisco City Council established August 10 as "Maung Maung Day" in San Francisco in honor of Maung Maung.
- The “Premio Provincia Capital,” in Rome, for the commitment over the years of the Federation of Trade Unions – Burma in the fight against forced and child labour.
- The third “Father Puglisi International Award” in Sicily, for the work of FTUB in human rights and its contributions to the fight against forced and child labor.
