= Seat filler =

Person who fills an empty seat during an event

A seat filler is a person who fills in an empty seat during an event. There are two types of seat fillers:

1. A person who subscribes to a seat-filling theatre club. Members of these clubs help fill in unsold seats for theatre, music, film, sporting events, dance performances and other live events. The producers of the event give complimentary tickets to the seat-filling organization, who pass them on to their members. The producers get a fuller audience and therefore a better experience for the paying patrons (and talent), while the seat-filler is able to see an event for a small service charge. Within the industry, this is also referred to as "papering the house".
  Some seat-filling companies charge no surcharge per ticket and only a membership based fee. This model is popular in cities with a larger number of shows and therefore a higher number of tickets to go around.
2. A person who takes up spare seats when the person allocated the seat is elsewhere. An example of this is the Academy Awards in which members of the audience are on the stage receiving their awards, or because they are involved in producing the show. Seat fillers are primarily employed so that when TV cameras show audience shots, there are no empty seats.

== Benefits to the Shows ==
- Increased awareness of their show (especially helpful if new)
- Higher concession sales
- Fuller audience for a better show experience
- Marketing to a vocal audience
- Private and no cost. Most seat filler services offer their service for free to the shows with an attached promise that their members will not publicly state where they received the tickets from as to not impact future sales

== See also ==
- Claque
