= Spacer (self-storage) =

- Type: Private
- Industry: Self storage
- Headquarters: Pyrmont, New South Wales
- Area served: Australia
- Products: Self storage online marketplace
- Website: spacer.com.au

Spacer is an online marketplace for self storage, founded in 2015 and based in Sydney. Spacer allows people to rent excess space to other people. Spacer has similar features to Airbnb and ride-sharing apps.

In 2017, Spacer acquired US-based company Roost Shared Storage, a similar online marketplace, as well as its competitor Parkhound.
