= Filler (surname) =

Filler is a surname. Notable people with the surname include:

- Deb Filler (born 1954), New Zealand born writer/performer, character artist and producer
- Graham Filler, American politician
- Louis Filler (1911–1998), American teacher and scholar
- Martin Filler (born 1948), American architecture critic
- Ross Filler (born 1972), known as Remedy, American rapper
