= Confederation of Trade Unions, Myanmar =

Trade union in Myanmar

CTUM
- Confederation of Trade Unions, Myanmar
- မြန်မာနိုင်ငံလုံးဆိုင်ရာအလုပ်သမားသမဂ္ဂများအဖွဲ့ချုပ်
- Founded: 1991; 35 years ago
- Headquarters: Yangon
- Location: Myanmar
- Members: 65,002
- Key people: U Maung Maung, President
- Affiliations: International Trade Union Confederation
- Website: www.ctummyanmar.org

The Confederation of Trade Unions, Myanmar (CTUM), formerly known as the Federation of Trade Unions of Burma (FTUB), is a trade union in Myanmar (Burma). As of 2018, CTUM had 65,002 members, ahead of the Agriculture and Farmers Federation of Myanmar and the Myanmar Industries Craft and Services – Trade Unions Federation.

== History ==
Following the 1962 Burmese coup d'état, trade unions were suspended from 1962 to 1988. During the 8888 Uprising, protesting committees demanded the right to organise trade unions without political interference. In September 1998, labour activists re-formed a national trade union movement in Rangoon (present-day Yangon). In 1991, the coalition of affiliated unions formed the Federation of Trade Unions of Burma (FTUB) as an underground labour movement.

Until the Myanmar political reforms that began in 2011, the FTUB operated as a clandestine network. In 1998, Myo Aung Thant, an FTUB executive committee member, was sentenced to life imprisonment for labour organization activities within Myanmar. In 2003, three members of the FTUB, Nai Min Kyi, Yae Myint, and Naing Yatha, were sentenced to death for high treason. The International Centre for Trade Union Rights reported that: "The ostensible reasons for their sentences were that they had attended FTUB training on the Myanmar–Thailand border, were relaying information on forced labour to the International Labour Organization, and had published an article in a Burmese magazine which uncovered corruption in the national football league."

In October 2011, the Labour Organisation Law was passed, establishing the right of workers to establish labour unions. In March 2012, the Settlement of Labour Dispute Law was passed, establishing mechanisms to arbitrate labour disputes. In 2012, FTUM leaders returned from exile to Myanmar. In 2014, the union was renamed as the Confederation of Trade Unions, Myanmar (CTUM). In July 2015, Myanmar's Ministry of Labour, Employment and Social Security officially registered CTUM as a trade union.

== Affiliations ==
The CTUM is affiliated with the International Trade Union Confederation (ITUC). In 2016, the CTUM cited 650 affiliated unions across multiple industries.
