= Space (disambiguation) =

Space is a three-dimensional continuum containing positions and directions.

Space, SPACE, spacing, or The Space may also refer to:

== Arts, entertainment and media ==
=== Film and television ===
==== Films ====
- Space (1965 film)
- Space, a 1997 short film starring Karyn Dwyer

==== TV series ====
- Space (2001 TV series), a 2001 BBC production
- Space (miniseries), a 1985 TV miniseries based on the Michener book
- Space: 1999, a television show
- Space: Above and Beyond, an American TV series
- "Space" (The X-Files), an episode of the TV series
- "Space", an episode of the Adult Swim television series Off the Air
- "Space" and "Time" (Doctor Who), two mini Doctor Who episodes

==== TV channels ====
- CTV Sci-Fi Channel, a Canadian television channel previously known as Space from 1997 to 2019
- Space (Latin American TV channel)
- Space TV, an Azerbaijani television channel

=== Games ===
- Space (video game), a computer role-playing game series from Edu-Ware, Space I, Space II
- Space or square, a location in a board game

=== Literature ===
- Space (Michener novel), 1982, by James A. Michener
- Space (Baxter novel), 2000, by Stephen Baxter

=== Music ===
==== Groups and labels ====
- Space (French band), a 1970s French electronic music band
- Space (English band), an English indie rock band
- The Tremeloes, an English band who briefly used the name "Space" on some mid-1970s releases

==== Albums ====
- Space (The Arrogant Worms album), 2014
- Space (Bleach album), 1996
- Space (The Devil Wears Prada EP), 2015
- Space (George Benson album), 1978
- Space (KSI EP), 2016
- Space (Jimmy Cauty album), 1990
- Space (Modern Jazz Quartet album), 1969

==== Songs ====
- "Space" (Kaiit song), 2024, by Kaiit
- "Space" (M.I.A. song), by M.I.A. from her 2010 album Maya
- "Space" (Prince song), by Prince from his 1994 album Come
- "Space" (Slavko Kalezić song), a song by Slavko Kalezić as Montenegro's entry in the Eurovision Song Contest 2017
- "Space", a free-form musical piece performed by the Grateful Dead as the second part of "Drums" and "Space"
- "Space", a 1979 song by Alessi Brothers
- "Space", a 2020 song by Becky Hill
- "Space", a 1968 song by The Blackbirds
- "Space", a 1989 song by Candy Flip
- "Space", a 1978 song by Franck Pourcel and His Orchestra
- "Space", a 1967 guitar piece by Gábor Szabó
- "Space", a 1986 song by It's Immaterial
- "Space", a 1991 song by New Model Army
- "Space", a 2007 song by Sarah Buxton
- "Space", a 2011 song by singer-songwriter Norman Bedard
- "Space", a 2003 song by Something Corporate from North
- "Space", a 2016 song by Sabrina Carpenter from Evolution
- "Space", a 2020 song by Biffy Clyro from A Celebration of Endings

=== Venues ===
- Evanston S.P.A.C.E., a concert hall in the US
- Space, a performance venue of the National Institute of Dramatic Art, Sydney, Australia
- Space (Ibiza nightclub), a nightclub in Spain
- Space Studios, an artist studio organisation in London, England
- Space Theatre (Cape Town), in South Africa
- Space Theatre, within the Adelaide Festival Centre, Australia
- The Space (theatre), an arts venue in London, England
- The Space Cinema, cinema chain in Italy, now owned by Vue International

== Science and technology ==
=== Computing and typography ===
- Address space, and various hyponyms (data, code, virtual address spaces etc.)
- Code space, of a character set, the range of code points
- DSPACE or SPACE, in computational complexity theory
- Space (punctuation), the gap between text characters in typography
- Space bar, part of a computer keyboard
- Space, a telecommunications signal state; see Mark and space

==== XML and HTML character entities ====
- Em (typography) (&emsp;)
- En space (&ensp;)
- Non-breaking space (&nbsp;)
- Thin space (&thinsp;)

==== Unicode ====
- Three-per-em space (U+2004); Space (punctuation)
- Four-per-em space (U+2005); see Space (punctuation)
- Six-per-em space (U+2006); see Space (punctuation)
- Figure space (U+2007)
- Punctuation space (U+2008); see Space (punctuation)
- Hair space (U+200A)
- Zero-width space (U+200B)

=== Other uses in science and technology ===
- Outer space or space, the expanse that exists beyond Earth's atmosphere
  - Space exploration, human activities in outer space
- Space (mathematics), a set with some added structure
- Three-dimensional space, the typical notion assumed in classical physics
- Space.com, a space technology website
- Solution space, the set of all possible candidate solutions in an optimization problem
- Anatomic space or spatium, a space (cavity or gap) in anatomy
- Spectroscopic All Sky Cosmic Explorer, a proposed satellite designed to measure the baryon acoustic oscillations

== Social science ==
- Mental space, a term in cognitive science
- Personal space
- Space (architecture), one of the elements of design of architecture
- Public space
- Social space
- Supportive Parenting for Anxious Childhood Emotions (SPACE), a parent-based treatment for childhood anxiety and obsessive–compulsive disorder
- Urban space

== People ==
- Arthur Space (1908–1983), American actor
- Zack Space (born 1961), former US Representative
- Space (gamer) (born 2000), professional Overwatch player

== Other uses ==
- Small Press and Alternative Comics Expo, an annual comic book convention

== See also ==
- Aether theories, a historical space-filling substance in physics
- Cyberspace, an interconnected digital environment
- Blank space (disambiguation)
- Code space (disambiguation)
- Empty space (disambiguation)
- Inner space (disambiguation)
- Spacer (disambiguation)
- Spaces (disambiguation)
- Spacing (disambiguation)
- Void (disambiguation)
- White space (disambiguation)
- Timespace (disambiguation)
- Spacetime (disambiguation)
