= Outer space (disambiguation) =

Outer space comprises the relatively empty regions of the universe outside the atmospheres of celestial bodies.

Outer space may also refer to:

== Music ==
- OuterSpace, a hip hop duo from Philadelphia
- Outerspace (album), a 2004 compilation by OuterSpace
- Outer Space (EP), a 2009 EP by S-Endz
- "Outer Space", a 2015 song by 5 Seconds of Summer from Sounds Good Feels Good
- "Outer Space", a 1997 song by the Muffs from Happy Birthday to Me
- "Outer Space" (Yelawolf song), from the 2015 album Love Story
- "Outerspace", a 2021 song by Don Toliver from Life of a Don
- "Cosmos (Outer Space)", a 2005 song by t.A.T.u. from Dangerous and Moving

== Other uses ==
- Outer space (color), a shade of black
- Outer space (mathematics), a topological space
- Outer Space (video game), a 1978 video game
- Outer Space, a 1999 short film by Peter Tscherkassky

== See also ==
- Outer Space Treaty, a 1967 treaty on international space law
- United Nations Office for Outer Space Affairs, a part of the UN Secretariat
- "Out of Space", a 1992 song by the Prodigy
- Inner space (disambiguation)
- Space (disambiguation), for the conceptual (abstract) sense of the word
