= White space =

White space or whitespace may refer to:

== Technology ==
- Whitespace characters, characters in computing that represent horizontal or vertical space
- White spaces (radio), allocated but locally unused radio frequencies
- TV White Space Database, a mechanism to enable utilization of the allocated but locally unused radio frequencies
- Whitespace (programming language), an esoteric programming language

== Other uses ==
- White space (visual arts), portions of a page layout or image left unmarked
  - Negative space, portions of a page layout or image deliberately left unmarked and used as a component
- Space (punctuation), the space between two words of text
- The White Space, a 2009 drama film
- White Space, a three-book science fiction series by Elizabeth Bear
- White Space Zone, the main hub in the video game Sonic Generations
- A location in the role-playing video game Omori

== See also ==
- Space (disambiguation)
- White room (disambiguation)
