= Spaces =

Spaces may refer to:

- Google Spaces (app), a cross-platform application for group messaging and sharing
- Windows Live Spaces, the next generation of MSN Spaces
- Spaces (software), a virtual desktop manager implemented in Mac OS X Leopard
- Spaces (social network), a Russian social network for mobile phones
- Gaps, a solitaire card game
- Spaces: The Architecture of Paul Rudolph, a 1983 documentary film
- IWG plc, parent company of the Spaces coworking office workspace chain
- Twitter Spaces, a social audio feature in Twitter

== Music ==
- Spaces (Larry Coryell album), 1970
- Spaces (Nils Frahm album), 2013
- Spaces (Violeta de Outono album), 2016
- "Spaces", a song by One Direction from the album Four

== See also ==
- Space (disambiguation)
