= Thomas Knightley =

British architect

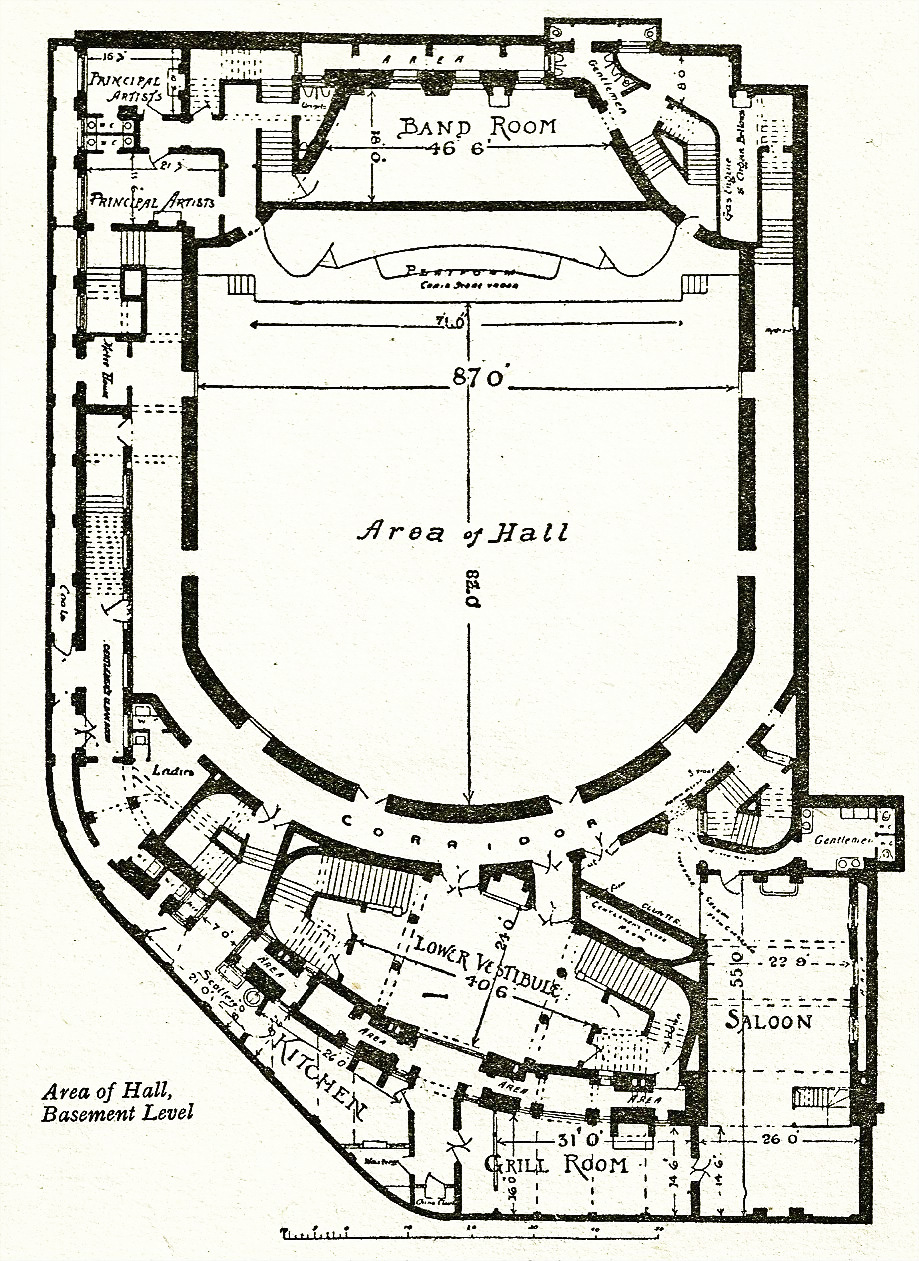
Plan drawn by Knightley for the Queen's Hall

Thomas Edward Knightley (1824–1905) was a British architect responsible for designing the Queen's Hall and St Paul's Church, Isle of Dogs in London.

== Biography ==
Knightley was sometimes considered eccentric; for example, he used the bodies of dead mice to act as a guide for the painters on the Queen's Hall, his preferred colour matching the shade of grey found on the mice's bellies.

== Gallery ==
Queen's Hall, 1912

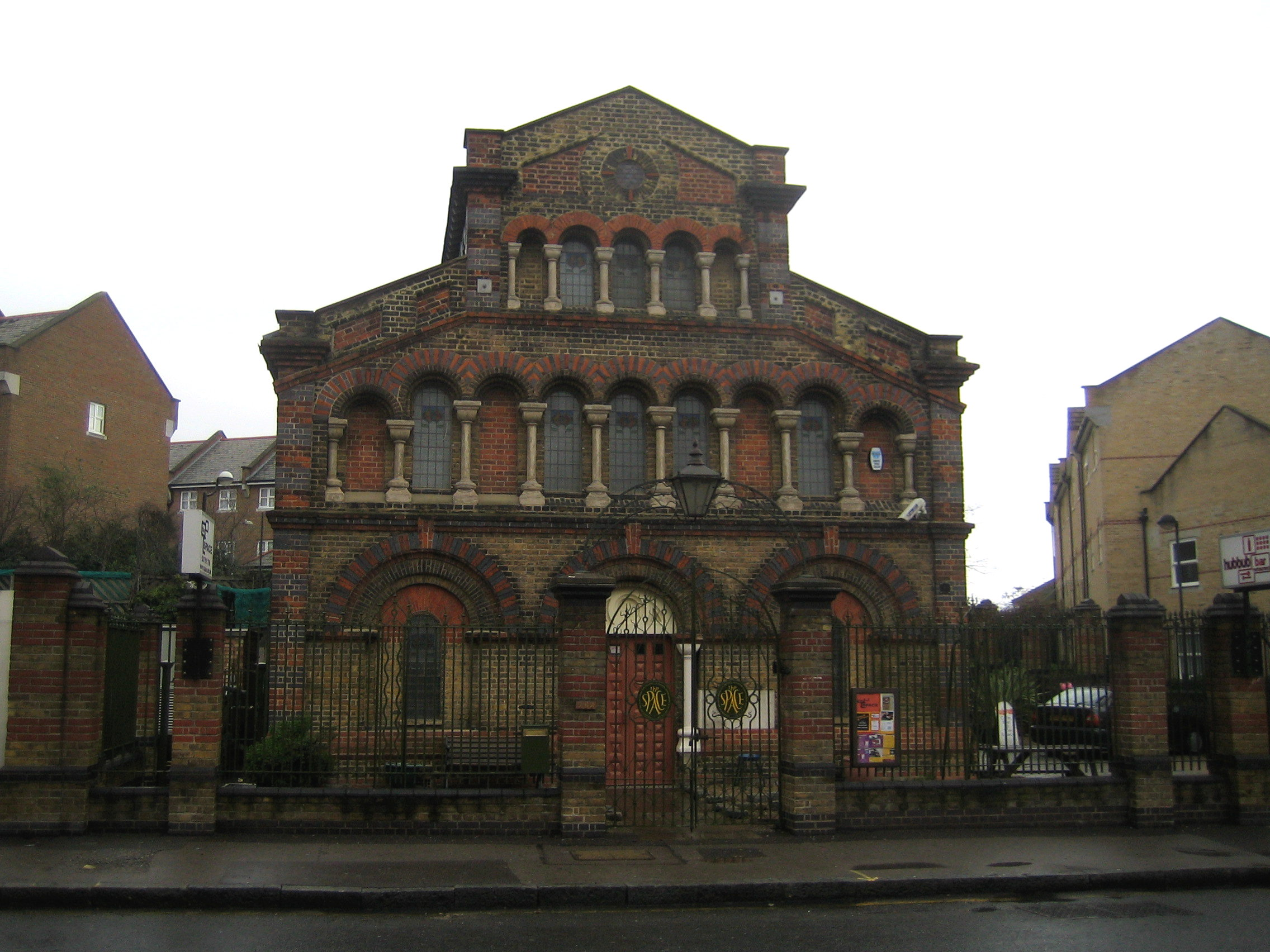
St Paul's, Isle of Dogs, 2006
