= Spacetime (disambiguation) =

Spacetime is a mathematical model in mathematics and physics.

Spacetime, space-time, space time may also refer to:

== Science and mathematics ==
- Complex spacetime, a theoretical extension of spacetime into complex-valued space and time coordinates
- Spacetime diagram, a diagram in the theory of relativity
- Space time (chemical engineering), a unit or measure of reaction time

== Computing ==
- SpaceTime (software), 3D search engine software
- Space–time tradeoff, a concept in computing
- Space–time code (STC), a technique in data transmission

== Music ==
- Jonah Sharp or Spacetime Continuum, music producer
- "Space Time", a song on The Shamen album Boss Drum
- "Spacetime", a song by Tinashe from Nightride

== Other uses ==
- SpaceTime, a role-playing game
- "Spacetime" (Agents of S.H.I.E.L.D.), a season 3 episode of the TV series

== See also ==
- Time (disambiguation)
- Space (disambiguation)
- Timespace (disambiguation)
- Space and Time (disambiguation)
