= Space and Time =

Space and Time or Time and Space, or variation, may refer to:

- Space and time or time and space or spacetime, any mathematical model that combines space and time into a single interwoven continuum
- Philosophy of space and time
- Space and time in Kant's Critique of Pure Reason

== Space and time ==
- Space and Time (magazine), an American magazine featuring speculative fiction
- Space and Time (Doctor Who), 2011 minisode of Doctor Who
- Space & Time (album), by R.M.C. (Madlib), or the title song
- Space & Time , an EP by Celldweller
- "Space & Time" (song), by Wolf Alice
- "Space & Time", a song on the Chance the Rapper album Star Line
- "Space and Time", a song on The Verve album Urban Hymns

== Time and space ==
- Time & Space (album) 2018 punk album by Turnstile
  - Time + Space (Turnstile song) 2018 song of the eponymous album Time & Space
- "Time and Space", a song by +/- from Let's Build a Fire

== See also ==
- Spacetime (disambiguation)
- Timespace (disambiguation)
- A Space in Time (album) 1971 album by Ten Years After
