= White Room (disambiguation) =

"White Room" is a 1968 song by rock group Cream.

The term may also refer to:

== Film and TV ==
- White Room (film), a 1990 Canadian film
- The White Room (UK TV series), a 1990s British music TV show
- The White Room (Australian TV series), a 2010 Australian TV show
- "The White Room," a 2023 episode of the TV show Only Murders in the Building

== Music ==
- The White Room (KLF album), a 1991 album by the band The KLF
- The White Room (Jonathan Thulin album), a 2012 album by Swedish-American musician Jonathan Thulin

== Other ==
- White room (spaceflight), an environmentally controlled chamber, part of a launch complex
- White room (torture), a sensory deprivation environment used in white torture

== See also ==
- White space (disambiguation)
