= Queen's Hall =

Former concert hall in Langham Place, London (1893–1941)

Coordinates: 51°31′5″N 0°8′33″W

- Queen's Hall from Langham Place, 1912

General information
- Status: Destroyed
- Type: Concert hall
- Architectural style: Victorian
- Location: Westminster, London, London, United Kingdom
- Opened: 25 November 1893
- Destroyed: 10 May 1941

Design and construction
- Architect: Thomas Knightley

The Queen's Hall was a concert hall in Langham Place, London, opened in 1893. Designed by the architect Thomas Knightley, it had room for an audience of about 2,500 people. It became London's principal concert venue. From 1895 until 1941, it was the home of the promenade concerts ("The Proms") founded by Robert Newman together with Henry Wood. The hall had drab décor and cramped seating but superb acoustics. It became known as the "musical centre of the [British] Empire", and several of the leading musicians and composers of the late 19th and early 20th centuries performed there, including Claude Debussy, Edward Elgar, Maurice Ravel and Richard Strauss.

In the 1930s, the hall became the main London base of two new orchestras, the BBC Symphony Orchestra and the London Philharmonic Orchestra. These two ensembles raised the standards of orchestral playing in London to new heights, and the hall's resident orchestra, founded in 1893, was eclipsed and it disbanded in 1930. The new orchestras attracted another generation of musicians from Europe and the United States, including Serge Koussevitzky, Willem Mengelberg, Arturo Toscanini, Bruno Walter and Felix Weingartner.

In 1941, during the Second World War, the building was destroyed by incendiary bombs in the London Blitz. Despite much lobbying for the hall to be rebuilt, the government decided against doing so. The main musical functions of the Queen's Hall were taken over by the Royal Albert Hall for the Proms, and the new Royal Festival Hall for the general concert season.

== Background ==
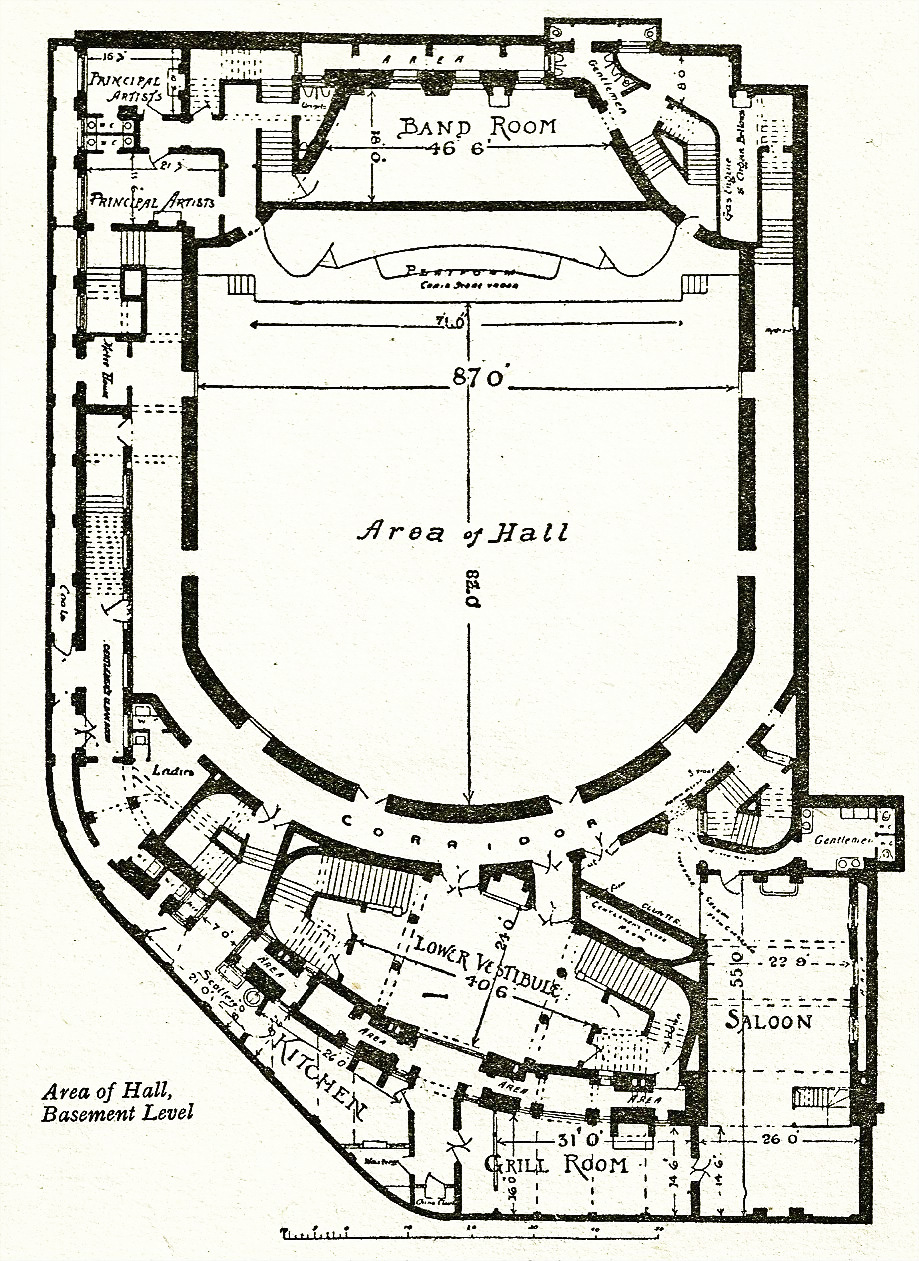
Knightley's plan for the platform level of the hall

The site on which the hall was built was bounded by the present-day Langham Place, Riding House Street and Great Portland Street. In 1820 the land was bought by the Crown during the development of John Nash's Regent Street. Between then and the building of the hall, the site was first sublet to a coachmaker and stablekeeper, and in 1851 a bazaar occupied the site. In 1887, the leaseholder, Francis Ravenscroft, negotiated a building agreement with the Crown, providing for the clearing of the site and the erection of a new concert hall. The name of the new building was intended to be either the "Victoria Concert Hall" or the "Queen's Concert Hall". The name finally chosen, the "Queen's Hall", was decided very shortly before the hall opened. The historian Robert Elkin speculates that the alternative "Victoria Concert Hall" was abandoned as liable to confusion with the "Royal Victoria Music Hall", the formal name of the Old Vic.

The new hall was to provide a much-needed music venue in the centre of London. St James's Hall, just south of Oxford Circus, was too small, had serious safety problems, and was so poorly ventilated as to be unpleasant. Bernard Shaw in his capacity as a music critic commented on "the old unvaried round of Steinway Hall, Prince's Hall and St James's Hall", and warmly welcomed the new building.

== Construction ==
Ravenscroft commissioned the architect Thomas Edward Knightley to design the new hall. (Note: Thomas Edward Knightley (1824–1905) was District Surveyor for Hammersmith for more than 40 years. For Ravenscroft, he had previously designed Bank Chambers in Chancery Lane.) Using a floor plan previously prepared by C. J. Phipps, Knightley designed a hall with a floor area of 21,000 square feet (2,000 m²) and an audience capacity of 2,500. (Note: Elkin gives a figure of 3,000, but this includes the platform seating for the performers.) Contemporary newspapers commented on the unusual elevation of the building, with the grand tier at street level, and the stalls and arena downstairs. The exterior carving was by Sidney W. Elmes and Son, and the furnishing was by Lapworth Brothers and Harrison. The lighting was a combination of gas and electricity.

Robert Newman, manager of the Queen's Hall Orchestra from 1893 to 1926

The original decor consisted of grey and terracotta walls, Venetian red seating, large red lampshades suspended just above the orchestra's heads, mirrors surrounding the arena, and portraits of the leading composers to the sides of the platform. The paintwork was intended to be the colour of "the belly of a London mouse", and Knightley is said to have kept a string of dead mice in the paint shop in order to ensure the correct tone. The arena had moveable seating on a "brownish carpet that blended with the dull fawnish colour of the walls". The arched ceiling had an elaborate painting of the Paris Opéra, by Carpegat. Of the accompanying details of the painting, E. M. Forster remarked on "the attenuated Cupids who encircle the ceiling of the Queen's Hall, inclining each to each with vapid gesture, and clad in sallow pantaloons".

In the centre of the arena there was a fountain containing pebbles, goldfish and waterlilies. According to the conductor Sir Thomas Beecham, "Every three or four minutes some fascinating young female fell into the fountain and had to be rescued by a chivalrous swain. It must have happened thirty-five times every night. Foreigners came from all parts of Europe to see it". At the top of the building, adjoining the conservatory, was the Queen's Small Hall, seating 500, for recitals, chamber-music concerts and other small-scale presentations. In July 1894, Bernard Shaw described it as "cigar-shaped with windows in the ceiling, and reminiscent of a ship's saloon … now much the most comfortable of our small concert rooms". The hall provided modern facilities, open frontage for carriages and parking room, a press room, public spaces and bars.

At the time, and subsequently, the hall was celebrated for its superb acoustics, unmatched by any other large hall in London. Soon after its opening, Shaw praised it as "a happy success acoustically". (Note: In a 1972 paper for the Royal Society, P.H. Parkin disputed the hall's reputation for superb sound: "Before the war the main halls were the Royal Albert Hall, the Queen's Hall, and the Wigmore Hall. The Queen's Hall is burnt down (incidentally its acoustics were not particularly good: there is nothing like getting burnt down as a way to get a good posthumous reputation for acoustics), but has been replaced by the Royal Festival Hall, which seats 50% more than the Queen's Hall did".) Knightley followed the example of earlier buildings noted for fine acoustics; the walls of the auditorium were lined with wood, fixed clear of the walls on thick battens, and coarse canvas was stretched over the wood and then sealed and decorated. He calculated that the unbroken surface and the wooden lining would be "like the body of the violin – resonant". The Observer commented that the building resembled a violin in construction and shape, and also that "the ground plan of the orchestra was founded on the bell of a horn".

Shortly before the opening, Ravenscroft appointed Robert Newman as manager. Newman had already had three different careers, as a stockjobber, a bass soloist, (Note: In the first years of the hall, Newman twice stood in as bass soloist in emergencies and was well received.) and a concert agent. The rest of his career was associated with the Queen's Hall, and the names of the hall and the manager became synonymous.

== Early years ==
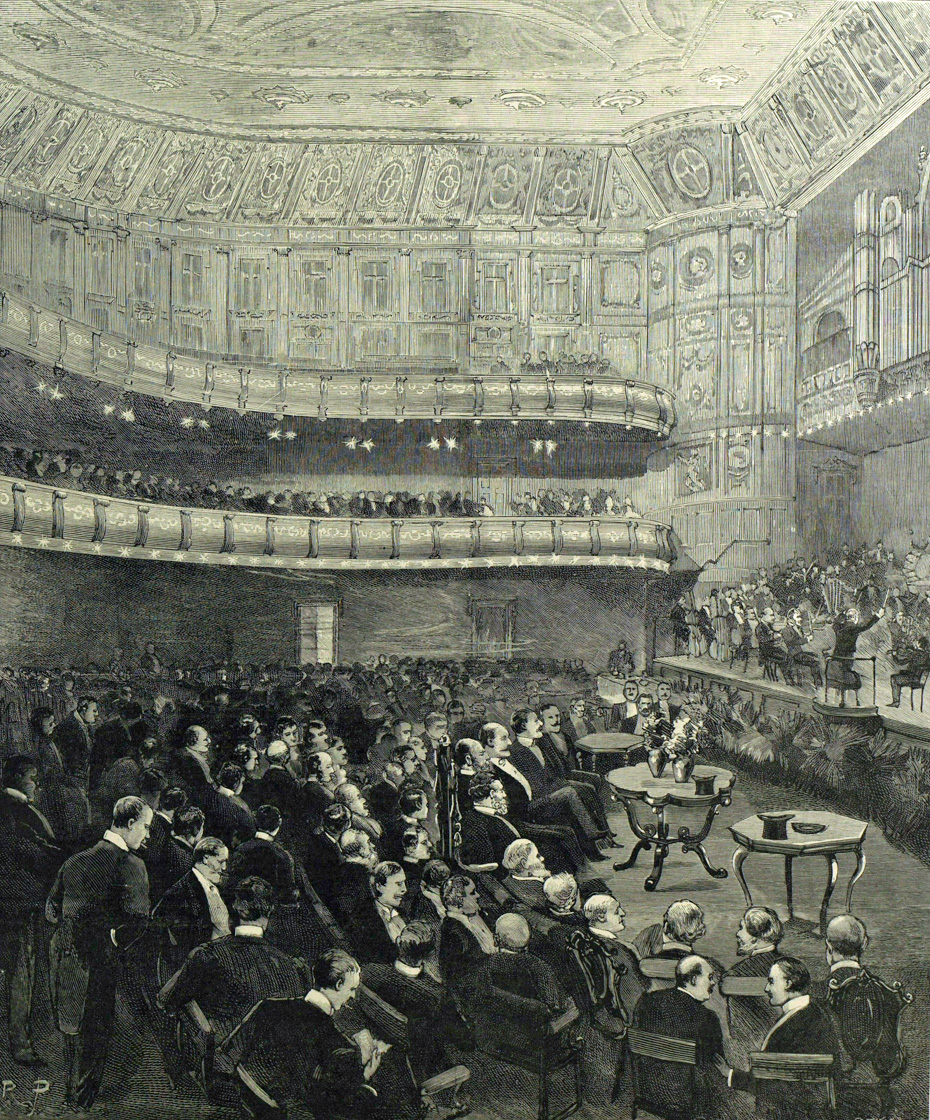
Royal concert in 1893

The Queen's Hall first opened its doors on 25 November 1893. Newman gave a children's party in the afternoon, and in the evening 2,000 invited guests attended what Elkin describes as "a sort of private view", with popular selections played by the Band of the Coldstream Guards, and songs, piano and organ solos performed by well-known musicians. After the performances, the seats in the arena were removed, lavish refreshments were served, and the guests danced.

On 27 November there was a smoking concert given by the Royal Amateur Orchestral Society, of which Prince Alfred (the second son of Queen Victoria) was both patron and leader. The performance was attended by the Prince of Wales and the Duke of Connaught. Knightley had built a royal box in the grand circle, but Prince Alfred told Newman, "my brother would never sit in that", and Newman had it demolished. The royal party was seated in armchairs in the front of the stalls (pictured right). The programme consisted of orchestral works by Sullivan, Gounod, Auber, Mendelssohn and Tchaikovsky, and solos from the violinist Tivadar Nachéz and the baritone David Ffrangcon-Davies.

The official opening of the hall took place on 2 December. Frederic Hymen Cowen conducted; the National Anthem was sung by Emma Albani and a choir of 300 voices assembled at short notice by Newman; Mendelssohn's Hymn of Praise followed, with Albani, Margaret Hoare and Edward Lloyd as soloists. In the second part of the programme there was a performance of Beethoven's Emperor Concerto, with Frederick Dawson as soloist. (Note: The other items in the miscellany of the second half were Handel's "Sweet Bird" (Albani), Cowen's "Absence" and "Parted Presence" (Hoare) and Gounod's Reine de Saba march.)

From the autumn of 1894, the hall was adopted as the venue for the annual winter season of concerts of the Philharmonic Society of London, which had formerly been held at St James's Hall. At the first Philharmonic concert at the Queen's Hall, Alexander Mackenzie conducted the first performance in England of Tchaikovsky's Pathétique Symphony, which was so well received that it was repeated, by popular acclaim, at the next concert. During the 1894–95 season, Edvard Grieg and Camille Saint-Saëns conducted performances of their works. The Society remained at the Queen's Hall until 1941.

=== Promenade concerts ===
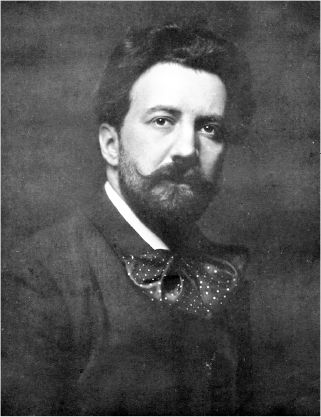
Henry Wood

To fill the hall during the heat of the late-summer period, when London audiences tended to stay away from theatres and concert halls, Newman planned to run a ten-week season of promenade concerts, with low-priced tickets to attract a wider audience than that of the main season. Costs needed to be kept down, and Newman decided not to engage a star conductor, but invited the young and little known Henry Wood to conduct the whole season. There had been various seasons of promenade concerts in London since 1838, under conductors from Louis Antoine Jullien to Arthur Sullivan. Sullivan's concerts in the 1870s had been particularly successful because he offered his audiences something more than the usual light music. He introduced major classical works, such as Beethoven symphonies, normally restricted to the more expensive concerts presented by the Philharmonic Society and others. Newman aimed to do the same: "I am going to run nightly concerts and train the public by easy stages. Popular at first, gradually raising the standard until I have created a public for classical and modern music".

Newman's determination to make the promenade concerts attractive to everyone led him to permit smoking during concerts, which was not formally prohibited at the Proms until 1971. Refreshments were available in all parts of the hall throughout the concerts, not only during intervals. Prices were about one fifth of those customarily charged for classical concerts: the promenade (the standing area) was one shilling, the balcony two shillings, and the grand circle (reserved seats) three and five shillings. (Note: In decimal coinage, respectively 5, 10, 15 and 25 pence: the equivalent of approximately £4 to £20 in terms of 2009 retail prices.)

Newman needed to find financial backing for his first season. Dr George Cathcart, a wealthy ear, nose and throat specialist, offered to sponsor it on two conditions: that Wood should conduct every concert, and that the pitch of the orchestral instruments should be lowered to the European standard diapason normal. Concert pitch in England was nearly a semitone higher than that used on the continent, and Cathcart regarded it as damaging for singers' voices. Wood, who was a singing teacher as well as a conductor, agreed. The brass and woodwind players of the Queen's Hall Orchestra were unwilling to buy new low-pitched instruments; Cathcart imported a set from Belgium and lent them to the players. After a season, the players recognised that the low pitch would be permanently adopted, and they bought the instruments from him.

On 10 August 1895, the first of the Queen's Hall Promenade Concerts took place. It opened with Wagner's overture to Rienzi, but the rest of the programme comprised, in the words of a historian of the Proms, David Cox, "for the most part ... blatant trivialities". Newman and Wood gradually tilted the balance from light music to mainstream classical works; within days of the opening concert, Schubert's Unfinished Symphony and further excerpts from Wagner operas were performed. Among the other symphonies presented during the first season were Schubert's Great C Major, Mendelssohn's Italian and Schumann's Fourth. The concertos included Mendelssohn's Violin Concerto and Schumann's Piano Concerto. During the season there were 23 novelties, including the London premieres of pieces by Richard Strauss, Tchaikovsky, Glazunov, Massenet and Rimsky-Korsakov. Newman and Wood soon felt able to devote every Monday night of the season principally to Wagner and every Friday night to Beethoven, a pattern that endured for decades.

=== Other presentations ===
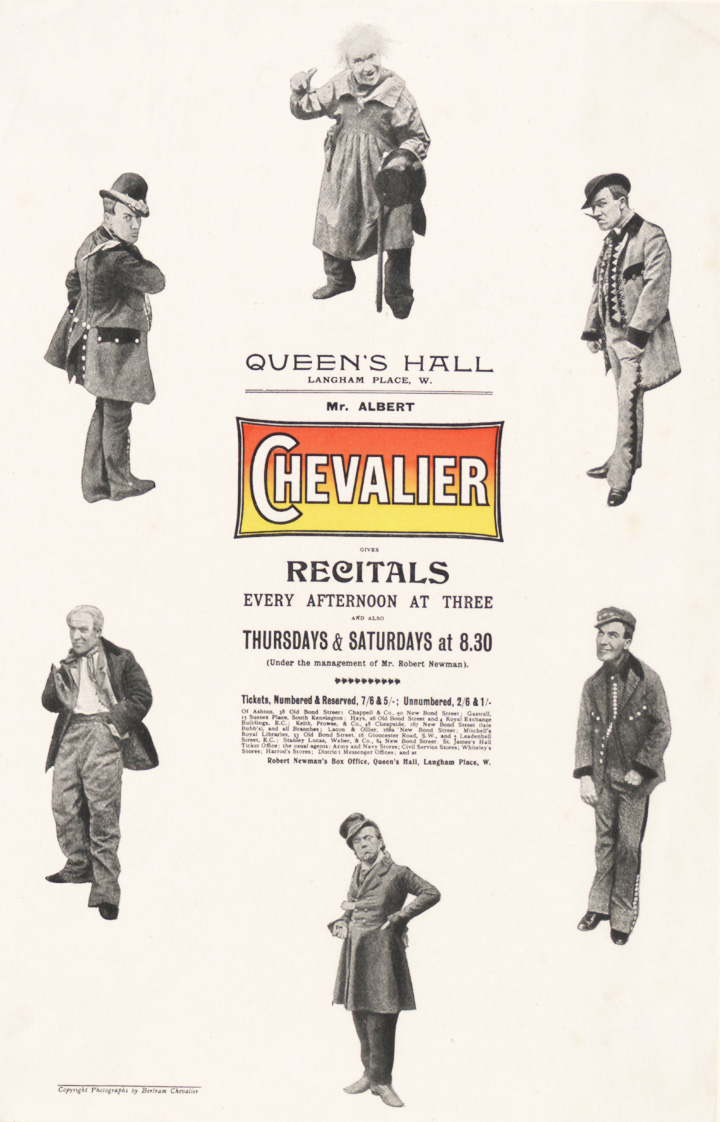
Poster for Albert Chevalier at the Queen's Small Hall

Many events at the Queen's Hall were not presented by Newman. The hall was frequently let to organisations such as the Bach Choir and the Philharmonic Society (from 1903 the Royal Philharmonic Society), and later the London Choral Society and Royal Choral Society. The hall was used for a wide range of other activities, including balls, military band concerts under Sousa, lectures, public meetings, Morris dancing, Eurythmics and religious services. On 14 January 1896, the UK's first public film show was presented at the Queen's Hall to members and wives of the Royal Photographic Society by the maker of the Kineopticon and Fellow of the society, Birt Acres, and his colleague, Arthur Melbourne-Cooper. This was an improved version of the early Kinetoscope.

Newman continued to be interested in new entertainments. The music hall entertainer Albert Chevalier persuaded him to instigate variety performances in the Queen's Small Hall from 16 January 1899. These shows were well received; The Times commented that Chevalier's "vogue with the cultured classes is as great and as permanent as with his former patrons".

Despite all these various activities, in the public mind the Queen's Hall quickly became chiefly associated with the promenade concerts. Newman was careful to balance "the Proms", as they became known, (Note: Although Wood did not generally use the term it became common currency even in the more formal newspapers. Even Wood used the term when referring to the Last Night of the Proms, which he called "the Last Prom of the Season".) with more prestigious and expensive concerts throughout the rest of the year. He would foster the careers of promising artists, and if they were successful at the Proms they would, after two seasons, be given contracts for the main concert series, billed as the Symphony Concerts. The Proms had to be run on the tightest of budgets, but for the Symphony Concert series Newman was willing to pay large fees to attract the most famous musicians. Soloists included Joseph Joachim, Fritz Kreisler, Nellie Melba, Pablo de Sarasate, Eugène Ysaÿe and, most expensive of all, Ignacy Jan Paderewski. Conductors included Arthur Nikisch and Hans Richter. Among the composers who performed their own works at the hall in its first 20 years were Debussy, Elgar, Grieg, Ravel, Saint-Saëns, Schoenberg, Richard Strauss and Sullivan.

== Early 20th century ==
In 1901 Newman became the lessee of the hall as well as its manager, but the following year, after unwise investment in theatrical presentations, he was declared bankrupt. The music publisher Chappell and Co took over the lease of the building, retaining Newman as manager. The Queen's Hall orchestra and concerts were rescued by the musical benefactor Sir Edgar Speyer, a banker of German origin. Speyer put up the necessary funds, encouraged Newman and Wood to continue with their project of musical education, and underwrote the Proms and the main Symphony Concert seasons. Newman remained manager of the hall until 1906 and manager of the concerts until he died in 1926.

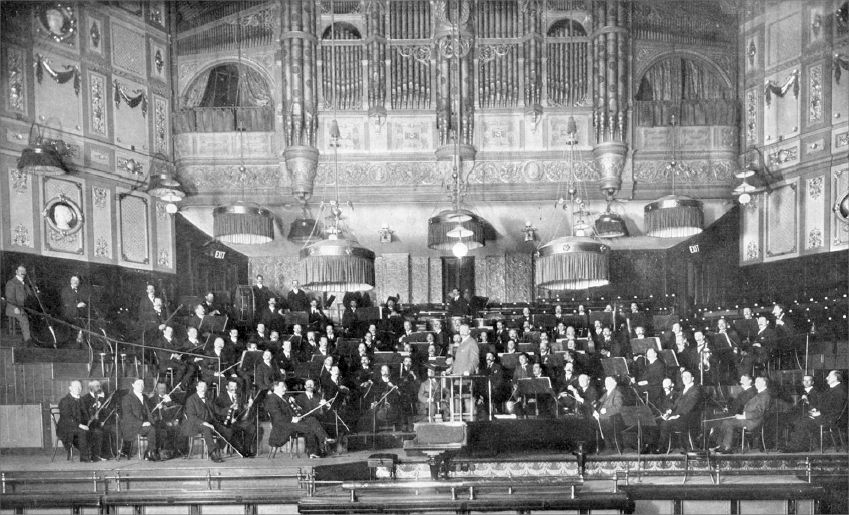
Sir Edward Elgar and the London Symphony Orchestra at the Queen's Hall in 1911.

The standard of orchestral playing in London was adversely affected by the deputy system, in which orchestral players, if offered a better-paid engagement, could send a substitute to a rehearsal or a concert. The treasurer of the Royal Philharmonic Society described it thus: "A, whom you want, signs to play at your concert. He sends B (whom you don't mind) to the first rehearsal. B, without your knowledge or consent, sends C to the second rehearsal. Not being able to play at the concert, C sends D, whom you would have paid five shillings to stay away". The members of the Queen's Hall Orchestra were not highly paid; Wood recalled in his memoirs, "the rank and file of the orchestra received only 45s a week for six Promenade concerts and three rehearsals, a guinea for one Symphony concert and rehearsal, and half-a-guinea for Sunday afternoon or evening concerts without rehearsal". (Note: In decimal currency, 45s (45 shillings) would be £2.25; a guinea was £1.05.) Offered ad hoc engagements at better pay by other managements, many of the players took full advantage of the deputy system. Newman determined to put an end to it. After a rehearsal in which Wood was faced with a sea of entirely unfamiliar faces in his own orchestra, Newman came on the platform to announce: "Gentlemen, in future there will be no deputies; good morning". Forty players resigned en bloc and formed their own orchestra, the London Symphony Orchestra. Newman did not attempt to bar the new orchestra from the Queen's Hall, and its first concert was given there on 9 June 1904, conducted by Richter.

By the 20th century the Queen's Hall was regarded not only as "London's premier concert-hall" but as "the acknowledged musical centre of the Empire". The drabness of its interior decor and the lack of leg-room in the seating attracted criticism. In 1913, The Musical Times said, "In the placing of the seats apparently no account whatever is taken even of the average length of lower limbs, and it appeared to be the understanding … that legs were to be left in the cloak room. At twopence apiece this would be expensive, and there might be difficulties afterwards if the cloak room sorting arrangements were not perfect". Chappells promised to rearrange the seats to give more room and did so within the year; the seating capacity of the hall was reduced to 2,400. War intervened before the question of refurbishing the decor could be addressed.

=== First World War and post-war ===
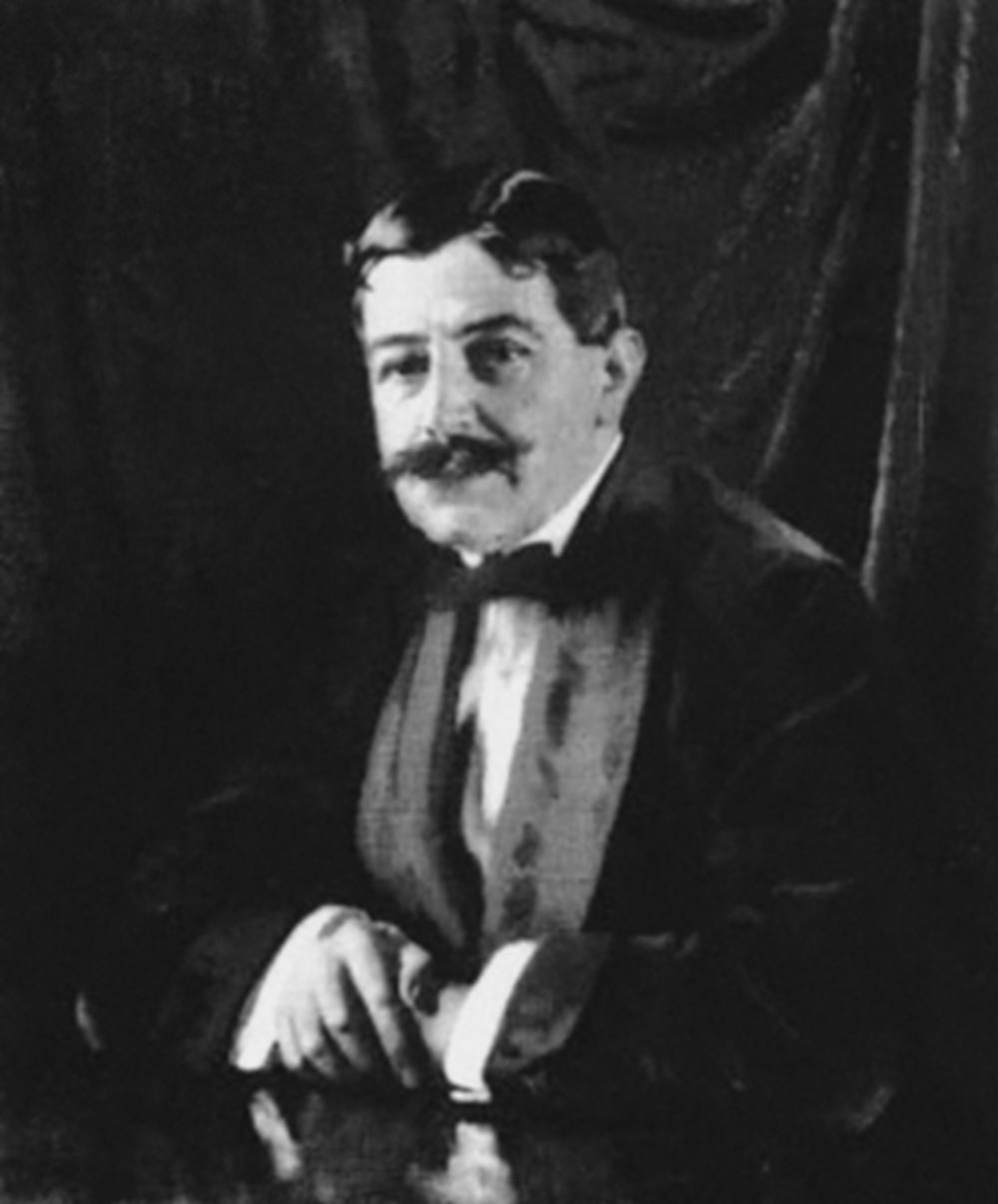
Sir Edgar Speyer

On the outbreak of the First World War in 1914, Newman, Wood and Speyer were obliged to consider the immediate future of concert-giving at the Queen's Hall. They discussed whether the Proms should continue as planned, and agreed to go ahead. However, within months anti-German feeling forced Speyer to leave the country and seek refuge in the U.S., and there was a campaign to ban all German music from concerts. Newman put out a statement declaring that German music would be played as planned: "The greatest examples of Music and Art are world possessions and unassailable even by the prejudices and passions of the hour".

When Speyer left Britain in 1915, Chappell's took on financial responsibility for the Queen's Hall concerts. The resident orchestra was renamed the New Queen's Hall Orchestra. Concerts continued throughout the war years, with fewer major new works than before, although there were nevertheless British premieres of pieces by Bartók, Stravinsky and Debussy. An historian of the Proms, Ateş Orga, wrote: "Concerts often had to be re-timed to coincide with the 'All Clear' between air raids. Falling bombs, shrapnel, anti-aircraft fire and the droning of Zeppelins were ever threatening. But [Wood] kept things on the go and in the end had a very real part to play in boosting morale". The hall was hit by German air raids, but escaped with only minor damage. A member of Wood's choir later recalled a hit in the middle of a concert:

[T]here was a crash, and then a cracking sound, and a shower of plaster began to fall from the roof of the Promenade, which was packed. There was a bit of a rush from the centre of the hall for a moment. One or two of the orchestra disappeared from their seats. Even Sir Henry Wood himself glanced rather anxiously up at the roof, though still wielding his baton. ... After the concert no one was allowed to leave the Hall. ... One of the orchestra nobly returned to the platform and struck up a waltz. We were soon dancing over the floor and really enjoying the experience. We were not released till about 1 a.m.

After the war, the Queen's Hall operated for a few years much as it had done before 1914, except for what Wood called "a somewhat disagreeable blue-green" new decor. New performers appeared, including Solomon, Lauritz Melchior and Paul Hindemith. During the 1920s, however, the hall became the battleground between proponents and opponents of broadcasting. William Boosey, the head of Chappells, and effective proprietor of the Queen's Hall, was adamantly against the broadcasting of music by the recently established British Broadcasting Company (BBC). (Note: From 1922 to 1927 the BBC was a company, after which it was reconstituted by Royal Charter as the British Broadcasting Corporation) He decreed that no artist who had worked for the BBC would be allowed to perform at the Queen's Hall. This put performers in a dilemma; they wished to appear on the air without forfeiting the right to appear at Britain's most important musical venue. The hall became temporarily unable to attract many of the finest performers of the day.

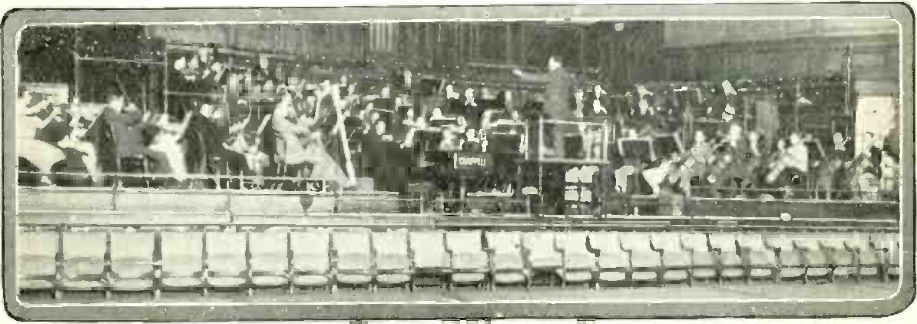
Sir Henry Wood's Queen's Hall Orchestra, rehearsing for the first Promenade Concert of the 1927 Season, from the BBC Hand Book 1928

In the middle of the impasse Newman's health failed, and he died in November 1926 after a brief illness. Wood wrote, "I feared everything would come to a standstill, for I had never so much as engaged an extra player without having discussed it with him first". Newman's assistant, W. W. Thompson, took over as manager of the orchestra and the concerts, but at this crucial point Chappells withdrew financial support for the Proms. After lengthy negotiations, the BBC took over from Chappells in 1927 as sponsor. The Proms were saved, and the hall continued to play host to celebrity concerts throughout the rest of the 1920s and the '30s, some promoted by the BBC, and others as hitherto by a range of choral societies, impresarios and orchestras. As Chappells owned the title "New Queen's Hall Orchestra", the resident orchestra had to change its name once again and was now known as Sir Henry J. Wood's Symphony Orchestra.

== Last years ==
In 1927, the Berlin Philharmonic Orchestra, under its conductor Wilhelm Furtwängler, gave two concerts at the Queen's Hall. These, and later concerts by the same orchestra in 1928 and 1929, made obvious the comparatively poor standards of London orchestras. Both the BBC and Sir Thomas Beecham had ambitions to bring London's orchestral standards up to those of Berlin. After an early attempt at co-operation between the BBC and Beecham, they went their separate ways; the BBC established the BBC Symphony Orchestra under Adrian Boult, and Beecham, together with Malcolm Sargent, founded the London Philharmonic Orchestra.

Both orchestras made their debuts with concerts at the Queen's Hall. The BBC orchestra gave its first concert on 22 October 1930, conducted by Boult in a programme of music by Wagner, Brahms, Saint-Saëns and Ravel. The reviews of the new orchestra were enthusiastic. The Times commented on its "virtuosity" and of Boult's "superb" conducting. The Musical Times commented, "The boast of the B.B.C. that it intended to get together a first-class orchestra was not an idle one", and spoke of "exhilaration" at the playing. The London Philharmonic made its debut on 7 October 1932, conducted by Beecham. After the first item, Berlioz's Roman Carnival Overture, the audience went wild, some of them standing on their seats to clap and shout. During the next eight years, the orchestra appeared nearly a hundred times at the Queen's Hall. There was no role for the old resident orchestra, many of whose members had been engaged by the BBC, and in 1930 it disbanded.

With orchestral standards now of unprecedented excellence, eminent musicians from Europe and the U.S. were eager to perform at the Queen's Hall. Among the guest conductors at the hall in the 1930s were Serge Koussevitzky, Willem Mengelberg, Arturo Toscanini, Bruno Walter and Felix Weingartner. Composer-conductors included Richard Strauss and Anton Webern. Some recordings made in the hall during this period have been reissued on CD. (Note: Toscanini made a series of commercial recordings with the BBC Symphony Orchestra from 1937 to 1939, issued by His Master's Voice in the UK and RCA Victor in the U.S., for example, Naxos CDs of Beethoven symphonies (OCLC 156089616) recorded in the Queen's Hall in 1937 and 1939. There are also recordings of Boult and the BBC Symphony Orchestra in Elgar's music recorded at the Queen's Hall, an off-air transcription of a 1936 Prom featuring Elisabeth Schumann, and a Mozart Sinfonia Concertante with Albert Sammons and Bernard Shore, Wood conducting (OCLC 34323364))

=== Second World War ===
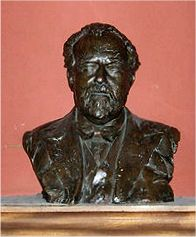
Bust of Sir Henry Wood, rescued from the wreckage of the hall in 1941

On the outbreak of the Second World War in September 1939, the BBC immediately put into effect its contingency plans to move much of its broadcasting away from London to places thought less at risk of bombing. Its musical department, including the BBC Symphony Orchestra, moved to Bristol. The BBC withdrew not only the players, but financial support from the Proms. Wood determined that the 1940 season would nevertheless go ahead. The Royal Philharmonic Society and a private entrepreneur, Keith Douglas, agreed to back an eight-week season, and the London Symphony Orchestra was engaged. The concerts continued through air raids, and audiences often stayed in the hall until early morning, with musical entertainments continuing after the concerts had finished. The season was curtailed after four weeks, when intense bombing forced the Queen's Hall to close. The last Prom given at the Queen's Hall was on 7 September 1940. On 8 December doors and windows of the hall were blown out by blast. After temporary repairs, concerts were continued; after further damage on 6 April 1941 repairs were again quickly made, and the hall re-opened within days.

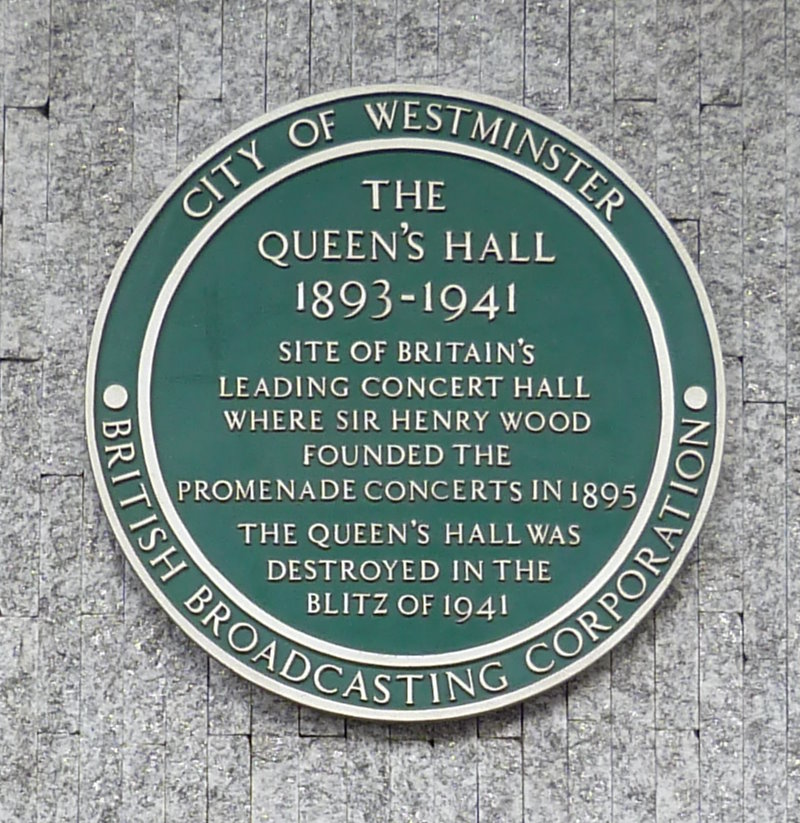
The Queen's Hall green plaque

On the afternoon of 10 May 1941, there was an Elgar concert at the hall. Sargent conducted the Enigma Variations and The Dream of Gerontius. The soloists were Muriel Brunskill, Webster Booth and Ronald Stear, with the London Philharmonic and the Royal Choral Society. This concert, the last given at the hall, comprised in the view of The Times "performances of real distinction". That night there was an intensive air raid in which the chamber of the House of Commons and many other buildings were destroyed, and the British Museum and Westminster Abbey were seriously damaged. A single incendiary bomb hit the Queen's Hall, and the auditorium was completely gutted by fire beyond any hope of replacement. The building was a smouldering ruin in heaps of rubble; the London Philharmonic lost thousands of pounds' worth of instruments. All that remained intact on the site was a bronze bust of Wood retrieved from the debris. (Note: The Queen's Hall had contained few memorials. In 1922 a bust by Malvina Hoffman of the tenor Gervase Elwes was placed in a special alcove at the back of the grand circle. In 1935 a memorial tablet to the pianist Fanny Davies was unveiled near the Elwes bust. Another memorial tablet was placed in memory of Robert Newman. These were all destroyed in the bombing. The bust of Wood that survived the destruction of the hall was by Donald Gilbert, unveiled in 1938 by Sir Walford Davies as part of the celebration of Wood's fifty years as a conductor. Its site was at the back of the Promenade floor. It is now on display at the Royal Academy of Music, except during Proms seasons, when it occupies a central position overlooking the orchestra at the Royal Albert Hall.) Concerts continued in London at the Royal Albert Hall and other venues. The Proms were relocated to the Albert Hall, which remains their principal venue. In 1951, the Royal Festival Hall was opened and succeeded the Queen's Hall as the main London venue for symphony concerts other than the Proms.

It was reported in late 1946 that the Commissioners of Crown Lands had increased the site's ground rent from £850 to £8,000, setting back the possibility of re-building the hall, or of building a new Henry Wood Concert Hall. In 1954 the government set up a committee, chaired by Lord Robbins with Sir Adrian Boult among its members, to examine the practicability of rebuilding the hall. The committee reported that "on musical grounds and in the interest of the general cultural life of the community" it was desirable to replace the hall, but it was doubtful whether there was a potential demand that would enable it to run without "seriously subtracting from the audiences of subsidised halls already in existence". From 1982, London had a second hall large enough for symphony concerts, in the Barbican Centre.

The former site of the Queen's Hall was redeveloped by the freeholder, the Crown Estate. It is now occupied by Treehouse Hotel London. In 2004, Richard Morrison wrote of the Queen's Hall:

Everybody who heard concerts in that hall speaks, or spoke, warmly of its acoustics and atmosphere … by all accounts it was perfect. It should have been rebuilt after the war: there were plans, committees, even the start of a fundraising campaign. But it wasn't, and since then London has not had a symphonic concert hall that comes remotely close to perfection. (Note: Morrison blames the cabinet minister Herbert Morrison for this; Herbert Morrison was determined that his pet project, the Royal Festival Hall, should take precedence. "The fact that the new Royal Festival Hall was in the wrong place, made of the wrong materials, and designed to the wrong shape, mattered not one whit". Richard Morrison compares the perfection of the Queen's Hall to the imperfections of the Festival Hall ("disastrously dry acoustics"), the Albert Hall ("giant-bathroom reverberation") and the Barbican ("an acoustical calamity").)

The site is now marked by a commemorative plaque, which was unveiled in November 2000, by Sir Andrew Davis, chief conductor of the BBC Symphony Orchestra.

== Notes, references and sources ==
=== Sources ===
- Ayre, Leslie (1966). The Wit of Music. London: Leslie Frewin. OCLC 557588486.
- Cox, David (1980). The Henry Wood Proms. London: BBC. ISBN 0-563-17697-0.
- Elkin, Robert (1944). Queen's Hall, 1893–1941. London: Rider. OCLC 636583612.
- Elkin, Robert (1946). Royal Philharmonic. London: Rider. OCLC 3141945.
- Jacobs, Arthur (1994). Henry J. Wood: Maker of the Proms. London: Methuen. ISBN 0-413-69340-6.
- Jefferson, Alan (1979). Sir Thomas Beecham – A Centenary Tribute. London: Macdonald and Jane's. ISBN 978-0-354-04205-5.
- Laurence, Dan H., ed. (1989). Shaw's Music – The Complete Music Criticism of Bernard Shaw, Volume 3. London: The Bodley Head. ISBN 0-370-31272-4.
- Morrison, Richard (2004). Orchestra – The LSO. London: Faber and Faber. ISBN 0-571-21584-X.
- Orga, Ateş (1974). The Proms. Newton Abbot: David & Charles. ISBN 0-7153-6679-3.
- Pound, Reginald (1959). Sir Henry Wood. London: Cassell. OCLC 603264427.
- Reid, Charles (1961). Thomas Beecham – An Independent Biography. London: Victor Gollancz. OCLC 500565141.
- Russell, Thomas (1945). Philharmonic Decade. London: Hutchinson. OCLC 504109856.
- Wood, Henry J. (1938). My Life of Music. London: Victor Gollancz. OCLC 30533927.
