= Timespace =

Timespace or Time-Space, may refer to:

- Spacetime, any mathematical model that combines space and time into a single continuum
- "Time Space" (EP), the 2012 single by Japanese singer and voice actress Nana Mizuki
- Timespace: The Best of Stevie Nicks, a 1991 greatest hits album by Stevie Nicks
- Timespace Tour, a 1991 concert tour by Stevie Nicks
- TimeSpace, a concept of the temporal turn in the social sciences

== See also ==
- Spacetime (disambiguation)
- Time (disambiguation)
- Space (disambiguation)
- Space and Time (disambiguation)
