= Inner space =

Inner space may refer to:

== Entertainment ==
- Destination Inner Space (1966), American science fiction film
- Taylor's Inner Space (1974), a television series by Ron and Valerie Taylor
- Innerspace (1987), a sci-fi comedy film
- Operation: Inner Space (1994), a computer game
- InnerSPACE (2009–2018), a Canadian television show
- InnerSpace (video game) (2018), an adventure video game

== Fiction ==
- Inner space (science fiction), a science fiction genre related to psychological fiction

== Places ==
- Adventure Thru Inner Space, a 1967 attraction at Disneyland
- Inner Space Cavern, a Karst cave in Georgetown, Texas, USA

== Music ==
- Inner Space (album) (1973), an album by Chick Corea
- Can (album) (a.k.a. Inner Space) (1979), an album by Can
- "Innerspace", a song by The Apples in Stereo on their album Fun Trick Noisemaker (1995)
- "Innerspace", a song by Mirror (2022)

== Technology ==
- Priam InnerSpace, a hard disk drive series by Priam Corporation in the 1980s

== See also ==
- Inner product space, a kind of vector space in linear algebra
- Lumen (anatomy), an inner space, lining, or cavity
- Outer space (disambiguation)
