= Supportive Parenting for Anxious Childhood Emotions =

Supportive Parenting for Anxious Childhood Emotions (SPACE) is a parent-based psychological treatment for anxiety disorders and obsessive–compulsive disorder (OCD) in children and adolescents. The treatment was developed by psychologist Eli Lebowitz at the Yale Child Study Center. Unlike most psychotherapies for childhood anxiety, SPACE is delivered entirely to parents; the child does not attend treatment sessions.

== Background ==
SPACE is based on research into family accommodation, the changes that family members make to their own behavior to help a relative avoid or reduce distress related to a psychiatric disorder, such as providing repeated reassurance, participating in rituals, or enabling avoidance. Family accommodation was first studied systematically in OCD in the 1990s and was subsequently found to be highly prevalent among parents of children with anxiety disorders, where greater accommodation has been associated with greater symptom severity and impairment.

The SPACE protocol was first described in 2013 by Lebowitz and colleagues, and an initial open trial reported in 2014 found the parent-based approach feasible and associated with reduced childhood anxiety.

== Treatment ==
A typical course of SPACE consists of approximately twelve sessions attended only by parents, although the length can be adjusted. Treatment focuses on two changes in how parents respond to their child's symptoms: increasing supportive responses that acknowledge the child's distress while expressing confidence in the child's ability to cope, and systematically reducing accommodation of the symptoms. Parents select specific accommodation behaviors to reduce, plan how to inform the child of the changes, and learn strategies for responding to difficult child reactions. SPACE can be delivered in individual or group formats, in person or by teletherapy.

Because no demands are placed on the child, the treatment has been described as an option for children who decline or cannot engage in child-focused treatments such as cognitive behavioral therapy (CBT) with exposure and response prevention.

== Research ==
A randomized noninferiority trial published in the Journal of the American Academy of Child and Adolescent Psychiatry in 2020 compared SPACE to individual CBT in 124 children aged 7–14 with primary anxiety disorders. SPACE was found noninferior to CBT on primary and secondary anxiety outcomes, with greater reductions in family accommodation. An accompanying editorial in the same journal discussed the trial as the first randomized comparison of a stand-alone parent-based treatment with CBT for childhood anxiety. Commentary in the medical press noted that sample sizes in equivalence research are usually larger, and that further study was warranted.

The 2025 international OCD treatment guidelines of the Canadian Network for Mood and Anxiety Treatments (CANMAT) and the International College of Obsessive-Compulsive Spectrum Disorders (ICOCS) state that SPACE has shown efficacy in pediatric anxiety disorders, and note that the treatment works entirely through parents and can be implemented when a child cannot or will not collaborate with treatment. As a treatment for pediatric OCD specifically, where fewer trials have been conducted, the guidelines describe SPACE as a "preliminary treatment option": a randomized controlled trial reported by Storch and colleagues in 2024, in which about half of participants had primary OCD, found OCD outcomes comparable to those reported in trials of exposure and response prevention, findings the guidelines rated as Level 4 evidence.

SPACE has also been adapted to group and telemedicine formats, including group delivery to parents via telemedicine in a public health clinic in Israel. An independent randomized trial conducted at the Tehran Institute of Psychiatry compared an online version of SPACE with another parent-training program (From Timid to Tiger) in parents of children aged 6–9, reporting significant reductions in child anxiety and family accommodation in both groups that were maintained at follow-up. A separate quasi-experimental study by an independent group at Ferdowsi University of Mashhad examined the program's effects on cognitive emotion regulation strategies in children with anxiety symptoms.

Adaptations of SPACE have been developed and evaluated in preliminary studies for conditions related to childhood anxiety. These include SPACE-ARFID, for avoidant/restrictive food intake disorder, which focuses on parental responses to a child's restrictive eating and was assessed in a pilot trial of 15 children; a parent-based intervention for functional somatic symptoms in children, evaluated in a pilot study; and SPACE-FTL, for highly dependent adult children (a pattern sometimes called "failure to launch"), which was evaluated in a preliminary randomized controlled trial with parents of 27 adults. The 2025 CANMAT/ICOCS international guidelines note these adaptations while describing SPACE and its derivatives as at an early stage of evaluation for these conditions.

A 2026 systematic review of twelve studies of SPACE, conducted by independent researchers and published in Child Psychiatry & Human Development, found that most studies reported reductions in child symptoms and family accommodation, with SPACE generally comparable to other interventions. The reviewers rated the majority of the included studies as low in methodological quality, noted that maintenance of gains at follow-up was inconsistent and that control conditions were limited across studies, and concluded that emerging evidence supports the potential of SPACE in reducing family accommodation and child symptoms.

== Reception ==
SPACE has received attention in the popular press in the context of rising rates of childhood anxiety. The Wall Street Journal reported on the approach in 2017, and a May 2020 cover story in The Atlantic on childhood anxiety featured the program and the concept of parental accommodation.

A self-help book presenting the program for parents, Breaking Free of Child Anxiety and OCD, was published by Oxford University Press in 2021.
