= Operation: Inner Space =

1994 video game

- Developer: Software Dynamics
- Publisher: Software Dynamics
- Director: Bill Stewart
- Programmer: Bill Stewart
- Composer: Doug Blackley
- Platform: Microsoft Windows
- Release: 1994-12-26
- Genre: Action / Strategy

Operation: Inner Space is an action game developed in 1992 and published in 1994 by Software Dynamics for Windows. The player's mission is to enter the computer (represented by "Inner Space") in a spaceship and recover the icons and resources that have been set loose by an invasion, and ultimately to destroy the "Inner Demon". The player interacts with other spacecraft along the way, and can compete in races for icons.

Software Dynamics' goals in creating the game were to have players interact with opponents rather than kill them and for players to have personalized worlds. The intention was to be funny, and the game features ships based on animals and military aircraft. The development focus was on gameplay, and the team tried to make the game run like a DOS game. The game includes a "Ship Factory", which allows the player to make and customize ships. Three add-ons were released that added ships and increased the Ship Factory's functionality. The game received highly positive reviews, with reviewers praising its artificial intelligence, replayability, and originality. The game is available for purchase on Software Dynamics's website, where the shareware version is available for download. A sequel, named Operation: Inner Space 2: Lightning was planned, but cancelled.

== Plot ==
The Inner Demon and its viruses have invaded the player's computer and infected its icons. Then the Inner Demon set up a lair in a black hole which changes position. Guarding this lair are four dragons each holding one of the Inner Demon's powers. Using a spaceship, the player goes into the computer's "Inner Space" to collect the uninfected icons and stop the Inner Demon. Along the way, the player will improve their ship and maintain relationships with the population of Inner Space.

== Gameplay ==
A typical game in progress

Each ship belongs to one of eight teams: the Avengers, Pirates, Predators, Enforcers, Renegades, Fuzzy Ones, Knights, and the Speed Demons. Each team has personality and behaviours; for example, the Knights tend to be helpful to their allies, whereas the Pirates enjoy looting other ships. The player can play as any ship from any team, except the Enforcers, who only police the levels as bots. Each team has pre-set relations with the other teams, which are not fixed and can easily change. Certain ships have special attributes, such as a cloak or shield.

Once the player has chosen a disk drive to "disinfect" and a ship (and therefore a team) to pilot, a directory to enter must be chosen. Once a directory has been chosen, the player is debriefed on the "wave", which includes which icons are present, which other ships are entering, and what hazards are present. Hazards include viruses, which infect icons, and turrets, which fire lasers or a specific type of weapon when a ship comes into close proximity. Upon entering a wave, the player's primary task is to collect each icon present. Icons are the game's currency used to purchase weapons and upgrades. Icons can be damaged (reducing their value), infected (which eliminates their value and causes the player's ship to temporarily lose control), or destroyed completely. Icons can spawn small ships called defenders to protect themselves. These ships circle around the icon and attack anything which threatens it. When an icon is captured, its defenders switch allegiance to the ship which captured it. Fuel tanks are present throughout, which the player must collect regularly to avoid running out of fuel. The player will encounter other ships and interact with them, which can include giving commands. Other ships may not be friendly and the player may enter combat. When a ship is destroyed, a resource pack is released containing its icons and a weapon. If the player's ship is destroyed, the game ends. Helping other ships may strengthen relations between its team and the player's team, and attacking will worsen relations. Friendly ships may come to assist if trouble is encountered. During a wave, any ship can call the "ambulance" which offers repair and refuelling services, weapons and upgrades. Weapons available range from missiles utilizing various targeting mechanisms, to fireballs. Upgrades include more powerful lasers and stronger armour. The player can purchase a new ship, although their identity and team does not change. The player leaves a wave by flying through an exit gate.

Occasionally, a black hole will appear and suck the player into the Inner Demon's realm. Here, the player must attempt to rob the Inner Demon of its powers. If the player manages this, a special weapon (called a "noble weapon") is released. Damage inflicted on the player here is not permanent. The player returns to normal upon exiting when a noble weapon is collected, or is destroyed. Whilst the game claims that all four noble weapons are required, it is actually possible to challenge the Inner Demon with just 'Uncertainty' and 'Enlightenment'. If the player is victorious, the game is won.

Inner Space has laws which all ships must obey. Crimes include destroying uninfected icons and attacking an Enforcer. A patrol Enforcer will occasionally enter and look for crime. If a crime occurs, an Intercept Enforcer is called in to arrest the offender. The offender will be handcuffed, taken to the Hall of Justice, charged and punished for the crime(s). Punishments include fines and confiscation of weapons. If the offender resists arrest, the Enforcer will respond accordingly before continuing with the arrest. In serious cases, a Terminator Enforcer may be summoned to destroy the offender.

Directories will occasionally, at random, become races (the directory where the game is installed is always a race directory). This means the player must race on one of three courses to win the icons. The icons are awarded to the player for a first-place win. Stealing icons is a crime and the thief will be arrested immediately upon doing so. There are duel directories, where the player is locked into a duel with other ships, and must either win or be destroyed.

The game can be played in either Action mode, where the player handles all the controls manually, or in Strategy mode, where the player gives commands to the ship, and the finer details are handled automatically. For example, the player can command the ship to attack a target, but cannot choose which weapons to use, or when or how they are used.

== Development ==
Operation: Inner Space was developed in 1992 for Microsoft Windows 3.1. Software Dynamics were aiming to have the game running at 36 frames per second on 16mhz 386 PCs, and aimed to develop a native Windows game that rivalled the performance of DOS games. The idea to develop the game came about because Software Dynamics wanted to develop something new after developing screensavers. The development team did not want the game to be like others where the objective is to kill everyone, but rather to play with the opponents instead. They team aimed to create an artificial intelligence that felt like real opponents.

Another aspect they wanted to achieve was personalized worlds for each user. This was believed important because they thought consumers liked things customized just for them. Furthering this goal was the creation of the Ship Factory to enable players to create ships, which Bill Stewart, the game's director, stated was not easy. It was felt that the game should be funny, and to that end, the team "couldn't resist going wild" and created ships such as ducks, tigers, and Mig 29s, and made the fuel tanks change into items such as tea cups at certain times of day. Another goal the team had was to make players think of the game objects as real by giving them as many characteristics as they could, such as rocks heating up when shot and doing more damage if a collision occurs when heated. The team also wanted the sound and the graphics to be interesting to the player, and spent "endless hours" perfecting the voice overs to present useful information in such a way. According to Stewart, the team spent "thousands of hours designing, programming, and debugging", and they did not know if anybody was going to like it because it "ventured into uncharted territory".

Three add-ons were released; a Ship Builder's Kit, which enhanced the Ship Factory and enables the player to import ships. This is required for the other two add-ons; the Military and Nations of The World ship sets, which add military ships such as tanks and World War I and World War II planes, and ships based on various nation's flags respectively. These add-ons were combined and released as "The Works!", which includes sound and voice packages that are available separately.

Operation: Inner Space 2: Lightning had been a planned sequel, but the publisher cancelled development. Software Dynamics, now known as Dynamic Karma, has stated it has no intentions of further game development.

== Reception ==
Operation: Inner Space received critical acclaim. Gamer's Ledge lauded the game, and described it as "An excellent example for other developers to emulate". Maximize Magazine said the game rivalled the best Macintosh games. PC Multimedia & Entertainment Magazine praised the artificial intelligence, and reviewer Michael Bendner was impressed that the game could fit onto one floppy disk.

The game made it into the finalists for Ziff Davis's 1995 Shareware Awards, where it was called "The best of a new breed of native Windows games". Happy Puppy Games praised the game's originality, describing the use of the hard disk contents as game elements as "simply brilliant". Windows Magazine called the gameplay "unique". The Shareware Shop complimented its "Excellent sound and graphics". Midnight Publications complimented the addictiveness. Dan Nguyen of Games Domain commended the game, describing it as "awesome", and was also impressed with the game's small size on disk. Computer life commented that "Inner Space encourages and empowers your creativity!". Windows 95 uncut called it "Simply the best". Computer Life UK considered the game "an animated, audio-filled blast". PC Direct called the game "the arcade shoot 'em-up with attitude". Chuck Miller of Computer Gaming World commented that the game "offers an entertaining twist to a classic game idea", and praised the humour, although he criticized the design of the interface, saying it lacked the sophistication of the rest of the game.

The game was not without its critics. Jason Bednarik of World Village called the game "repetitious", further stating that the icon collecting and challenging the Inner Demon made it more tedious. He concluded by calling the game a remake of Asteroids, commenting that it was not worth the price.
