= The Space (theatre) =

Performing arts and community centre

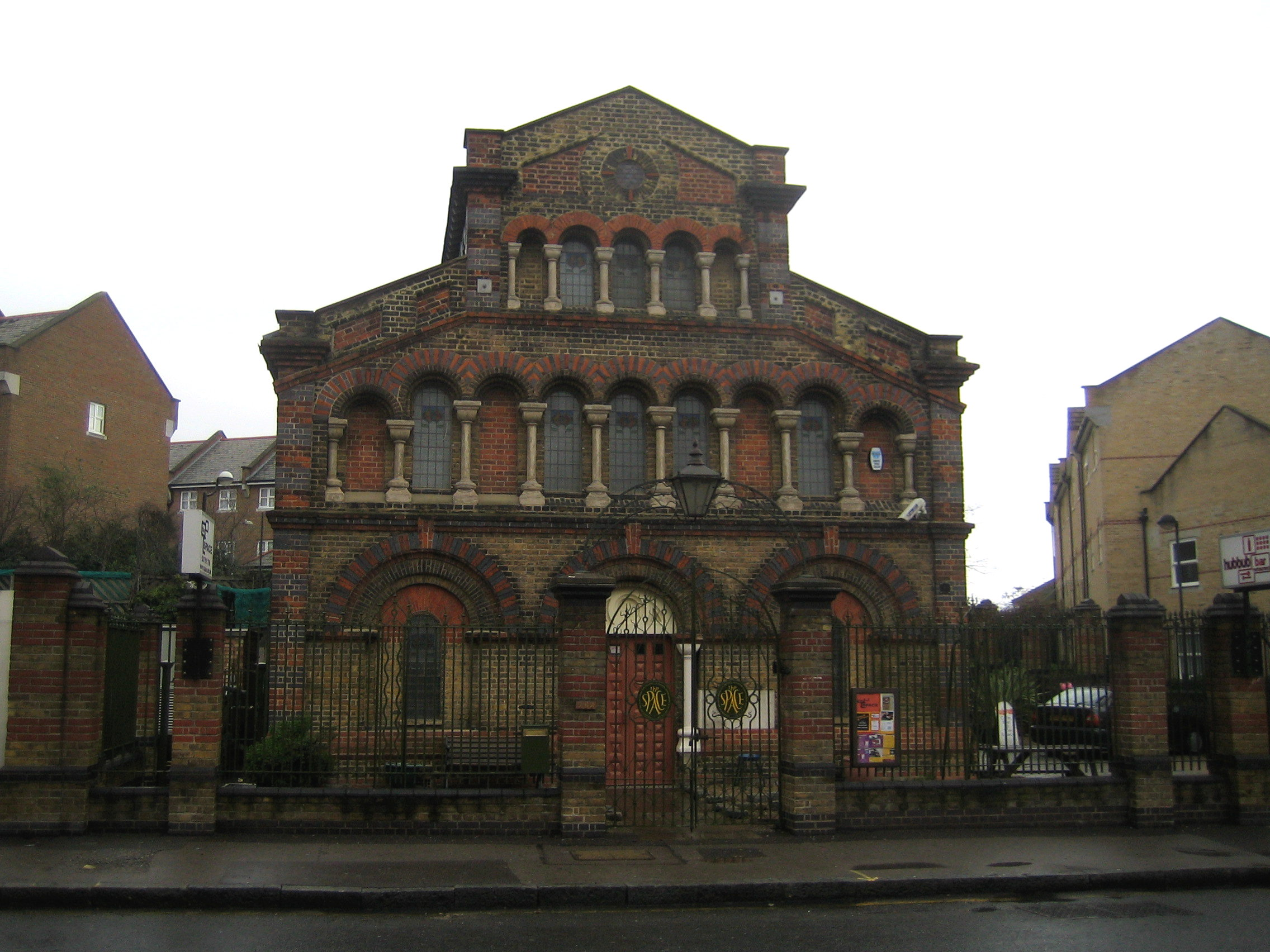
- Interactive map of The Space
- Location: 269 Westferry Road; Isle of Dogs; London, E14; United Kingdom
- Coordinates: 51.492158°N 0.024249°W
- Owner: St Paul's Arts Trust
- Seating type: Variable
- Capacity: 60-145
- Type: Arts venue
- Public transit: Mudchute

Construction
- Built: 1859
- Opened: 1996; 30 years ago

Website
- space.org.uk

The Space is an arts space in Millwall on the Isle of Dogs, London. Its principal patrons are Sir Ian McKellen and Marie McLaughlin, and it is a registered non-profit making charity.

== History ==
The Space is located inside a former Presbyterian church. Dedicated to St. Paul, this was built in 1859 for the Scottish Presbyterian congregation who had migrated to the Isle of Dogs to work in the shipyards. It was designed by Thomas Knightley. It was taken over by the St Paul's Arts Trust, headed by Robert Richardson, in 1989, and was restored and reopened in 1996.

== Performances ==
The Space offers many kinds of performances, including dance, drama and live music. Its first in-house production was a double bill of Dogg's Hamlet and The Real Inspector Hound, the former starring Adam Hemming (the theatre's former artistic director) as the headmaster. It produces its own shows with in-house production company SpaceWorks in addition to hosting performances from theatre companies and artists from all over the UK and beyond. The Space supports new and emerging artists who are fresh out of drama school or anyone looking to put on their first show. Les Enfants Terribles, Nick Helm, Ian McKellen and Mitch Benn have all frequented The Space.

== Facilities ==
The Space Bar is the restaurant/bar located above The Space. It is wholly owned by the St Paul’s Arts Trust charity.

The Space has established itself as a community theatre and is staffed mainly by volunteers.
