= Code space =

Code space may refer to:

- Code space, where machine code is stored in memory address space
- Code space or codespace, the range of code points for a character encoding
