= Aprilia RX =

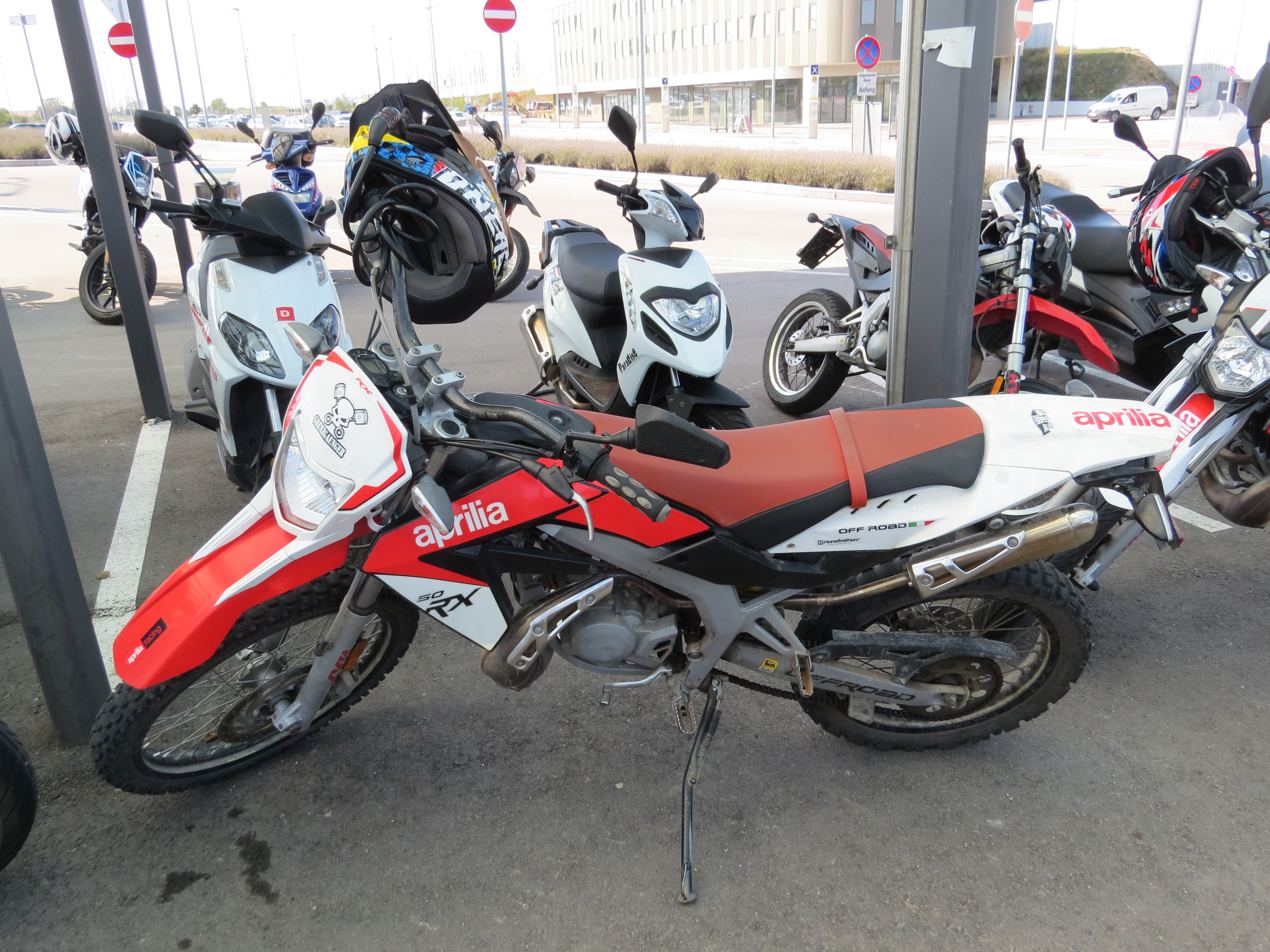
- Aprilia RX 50
- Manufacturer: Aprilia
- Parent company: Piaggio
- Production: 2006-present
- Class: Enduro
- Engine: 50–125–250 cc (3.1–7.6–15.3 cu in) liquid cooled, single cylinder
- Top speed: 50cc: 90 km/h (56 mph); 125cc: 125 km/h (78 mph)
- Transmission: 6-speed manual
- Suspension: Ø40 mm hydraulic fork with leading axle; wheel travel 195 mm Rear: hydraulic monoshock; Non-adjustable; wheel travel 180 mm
- Brakes: Front: 300 mm stainless steel disc; floating quad-piston caliper Rear: 180 mm stainless steel disc; twin-piston caliper
- Related: Aprilia SX

The Aprilia RX is an Enduro motorcycle widely produced by Aprilia. It is powered by a six-speed, carburetor-fuelled, nikasil-lined and cast iron single-cylinder two-stroke engine manufactured by Derbi/Piaggio.

== Styling and concept ==
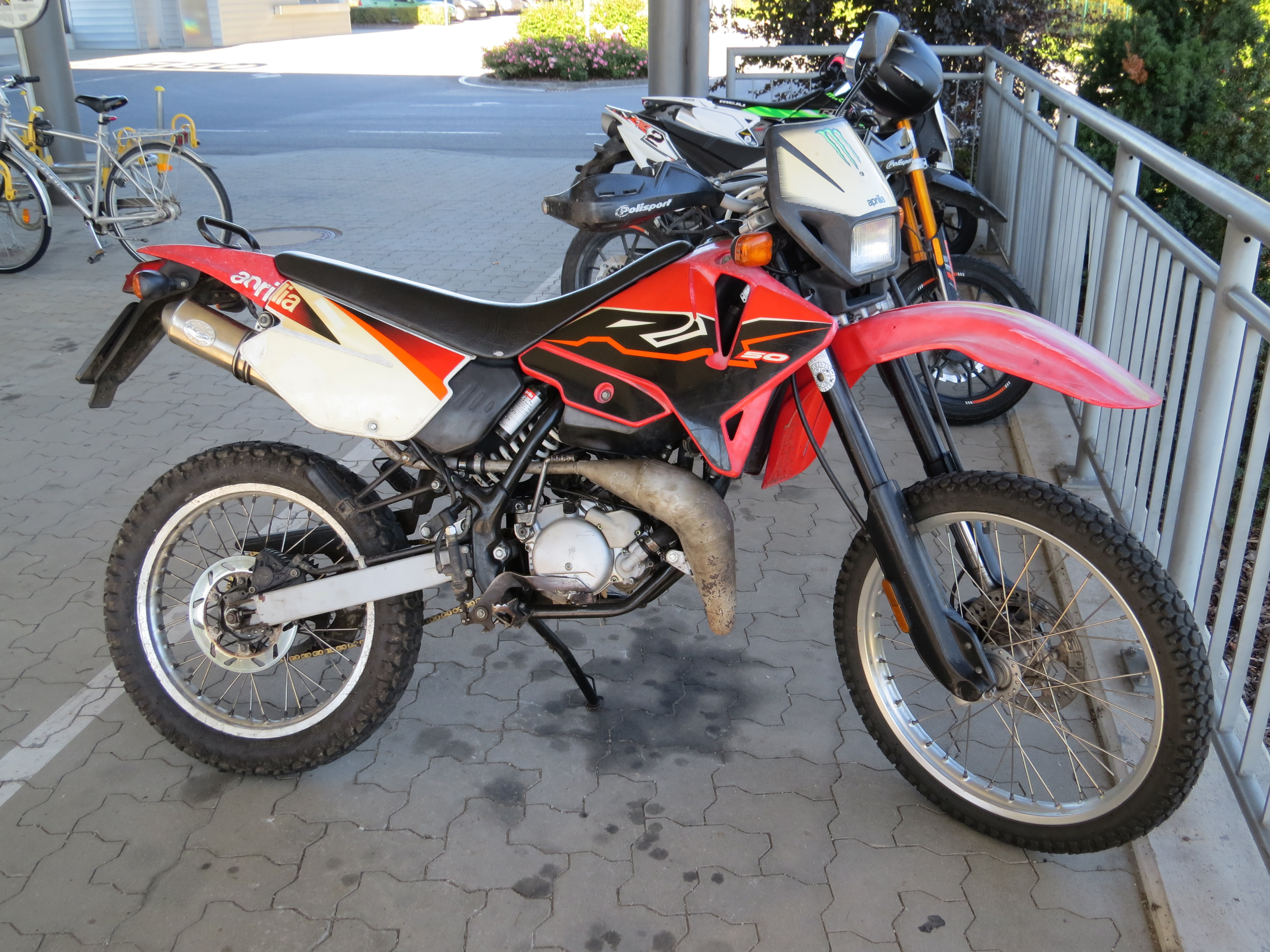
1992 Aprilia RX 50

The 2006 Aprilia RX is the renovated successors of the Aprilia RX first produced in 1992; the panels and layout are based closely on the bigger displacement Aprilia RXV.

== Engine ==
The engine in the Aprilia RX 50 is sourced from Derbi/Piaggio (D50B0/D50B1). This engine is used in the Derbi Senda DRD/X-Race/X-Treme supermotos and crossers, as well as the 2006 onwards Derbi GPR 50 and Aprilia RS 50 road bikes, although the road bikes feature an electric starter instead of a kickstarter on the supermotos. Engine parts from the crossers and supermotos can be directly swapped with one another; there are some small differences between the road bike and supermoto engine and frame which may require modification to transfer some external engine parts (exhaust, airbox etc.)

== Specifications ==
=== RX50 ===
50 cc single cylinder, six petal reed valve case induction and two-stroke injection (automix) carburetor fueled

Engine displacement = 49.76 cc
Bore/stroke = 39,88×40 mm
Compression ratio = 11.5:1
Clutch = Wet, multiple plate
Starting = Kickstart
Exhaust = Catalytic converter
Rotor Ignition/Generator = 85w/120w
Cooling System = Liquid-cooled
Fuel Tank Size = 7 litres
Fuel System = Carburetor Dell'Orto PVHA 17.5 mm

Main Jet = 95
Needle Jet = A13, notch #2
Idle Jet = 30

Transmission

1st = 1st 11/34
2nd = 2nd 15/30
3rd = 3rd 18/27
4th = 4th 20/24
5th = 5th 22/23
6th = 6th 23/22
Primary Drive = 21/78

Sprockets

Front = 14 Teeth
Rear = 53 Teeth
Overall Final Drive ratio = 14/53

Spark Plug = DENSO W27ESR-U/IW27 NGK BR9ES/BR9EG/BR9EIX

Gap = .6-7 mm

Wheelbase = 55.354 in (1,406 mm)
Length = 79.68 in (2,024 mm)
Width = 80.511 in (2,045 mm)
Height = 32.677 in (830 mm)
Tires = Front: 90/90 - 21 inch; Rear: 110/80 - 18-inch

=== Restriction ===
Restriction varies depending on the country and sky, person, or company the bike is purchased from. The engine is usually restricted in the following ways:

Carburetor

'Strangle' baffle/plate in Air filter manifold
74 Main jet

Exhaust

Exhaust fume/pressure outlet pipes
Catalytic converter

Sprockets

Front; reduced to 11/53 or 12/53

Ignition system (only on models 2018 and after)

Limited to 8000 RPM
