= Aprilia Dorsoduro =

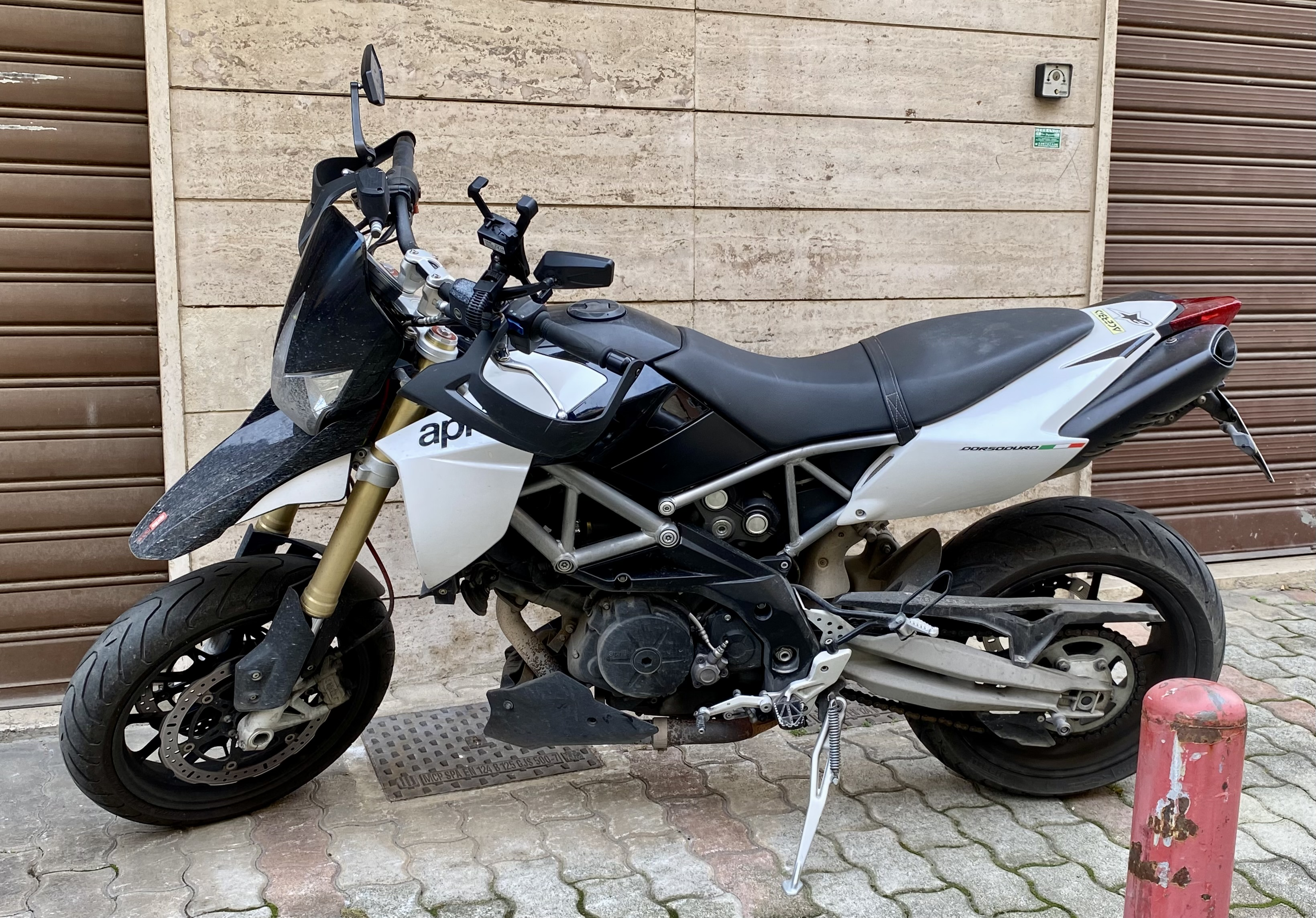
- Manufacturer: Aprilia
- Parent company: Piaggio
- Production: 2008-2015 (750); 2011-2015 (1200); 2017-2020 (900)
- Class: Supermotard
- Engine: 749 cc (45.7 cu in); 1,197 cc (73.0 cu in); 896 cc (54.7 cu in) Aprilia four-stroke 90° V-twin engine
- Bore / stroke: 92 mm × 56.4 mm (3.62 in × 2.22 in); 106 mm × 67.8 mm (4.17 in × 2.67 in); 92 mm × 67.4 mm (3.62 in × 2.65 in)
- Transmission: 6-speed
- Frame type: Steel tube with aluminum subframe plates
- Brakes: Dual 320 mm disc with 4-piston calipers (Front); 240 mm disc with 1-piston caliper (Rear)
- Weight: 186 kg (409 lbs) (750 cc) (Note: Dorsoduro 750.) (dry); 195 kg (430 lbs) (900 cc) (dry); 212 kg (467.4 lbs) (1200 cc) (dry); 206 kg (454.2 lbs) (750 cc) (Note: Dorsoduro 750 (in German).) (wet); 222.5 kg (490.5 lbs) (1200 cc) (wet)
- Fuel capacity: 12.0 L (3.17 gal) (750 / 900 cc) (Note: Shiver 900 | Dorsoduro 900.); 15.0 L (4.0 gal) (1200 cc) (Note: Dorsoduro 1200.)
- Related: Aprilia Shiver 750; Aprilia Shiver 900; Aprilia Caponord 1200

The Aprilia Dorsoduro is a line of V-twin, supermotard-class motorcycles built by Aprilia, a subsidiary of Piaggio & C. SpA. The Dorsoduro line comprises three models: the 750 cc original, the later 1200 cc variant, and the final 900 cc version. All have similar appearances but have few common parts. The model was named after the Dorsoduro region of Venice, whose name translates to "hard ridge".

== Dorsoduro 750 ==
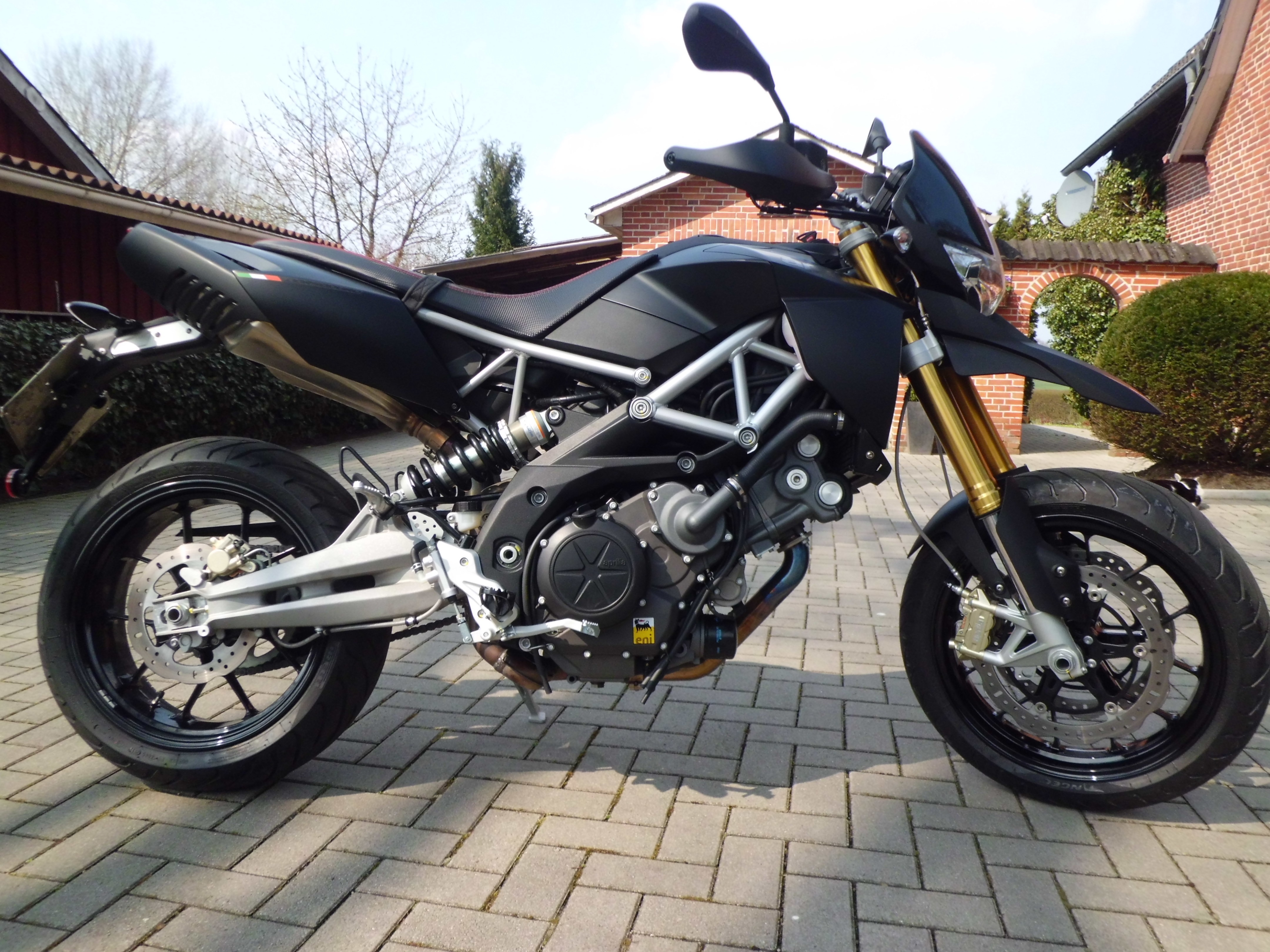
Aprilia Dorsoduro 750

Aprilia revealed the Dorsoduro in 2007 at the EICMA show in Milan as the SMV 750 Dorsoduro. The model was based on the successful Shiver 750, with which it shared the engine and frame, but differed in suspension and tuning.

First available for the 2008 model year, the Dorsoduro 750 was Aprilia's first foray into the "maxi-moto" class. Unlike Aprilia's supermoto designs, the Dorsoduro included some features more common to standard and touring bikes, like optional ABS and adjustable throttle mapping. The 2008 model produced a claimed 92 brake horsepower at 8750 rpm, and weighed 186 kg (409 lbs) dry.

== Dorsoduro 1200 ==
The 1200 cc model was introduced in 2010 and despite the common name the 750 and 1200 actually share few parts. The Dorsoduro 1200 has more in common with the Aprilia Caponord 1200 (2013–present). The 1200 cc model became the only Dorsoduro in the 2016 model year.

=== 1200 motor ===
The engine was designed by Federico Martini, head of Powertrain at Piaggio, and was modelled after the Ducati 1198. Both motors have the same bore, and stroke (106mm, 67.8mm). The position of the front and rear cylinders were reversed on the crankshaft, compared to the 750, this allowed the final motor to be 2mm narrower than the 750. The engine is fed by two 57mm throttle bodies controlled by a Marelli IAW 7SM ride-by-wire system. The engine breathes through a pair of 43.5mm intake valves and a pair of 37mm exhaust valves. The valves are actuated using the same chains and gear driven combination as the 750. To find more low and mid-range over the Ducati 1198, the Aprilia 1200 motor has two independently timed spark plugs, one centrally located, one off the side. The engine produced a claimed 130 hp (97 kW) @ 8,700 rpm.

The exhaust flows through a 2-1-2 exhaust with the catalytic converts in the silencers, whereas the 750 has the catalytic converter in the mid pipe.

=== 1200 chassis ===
The 1200 chassis with a 223.8 kg (493.5 lbs) curb weight contains a larger fuel tank(15L) to feed the larger motor. Up front, the 1200 has adjustable 43mm front fork with the rebound on the left leg, compression on the right, and both pre-load adjustable. In the rear, the 1200 has a three-way adjustable Sachs rear shock; preload, rebound, and damping.

The 1200 received Brembo four-piston, radial-mount calipers and dual Brembo 320mm discs up front and a 240mm disc with a Brembo single-piston caliper in the rear.

The 1200 also differs aesthetically in that it features extra head shields below the seat covering the rear subframe.

The 1200 also like the 750 did not receive traction control or ABS in the North American Markets.

== Dorsoduro 900 ==
The 900 cc model was produced for model years 2017–2020. It has a stroked out version of the 2007 Shiver 749cc engine (from 56.4mm to 67.4mm) to meet Euro 4 emission standards. It introduced a ride by wire system to the Dorsoduro line, and its three-spoke wheels saved over 2.4 kg (5.4 lbs) of weight. The Dorsoduro 900 is controlled by the Marelli IAW 7SM ECU.

== Model differences ==
Model	Dorsoduro 750	Dorsoduro 900	Dorsoduro 1200
Crank Power(bhp)	92 hp @ 8,750rpm	95.2 hp @ 8,750rpm	130 hp @ 8,700rpm
Peak Torque	60.48 ft•lbs @ 4,500rpm	66.3 lb•ft @ 6,500rpm	84 ft•lbs @ 7,200rpm
Wheelbase	59.25 in	59.65 in	60.16 in
Rake/Trail	25.8°/4.25 in	26°/4.25 in	27.3°/4.65 in
Final Drive Ratio	16:46	15:44	16:40
Ground Clearance	7.75 in		6.4 in
Seat Height	35.43 in	34.25 in	34.25 in
Maximum Height	46.65 in	46.65 in	47.44 in
Maximum Length	87.01 in	86.02 in	88.19 in
Maximum Width	35.63 in	35.63 in	36.42 in
Curb Weight	454 lb	467.38 lb	492 lb
