= Aprilia Tuono =

Motorcycle

Aprilia RSV Tuono
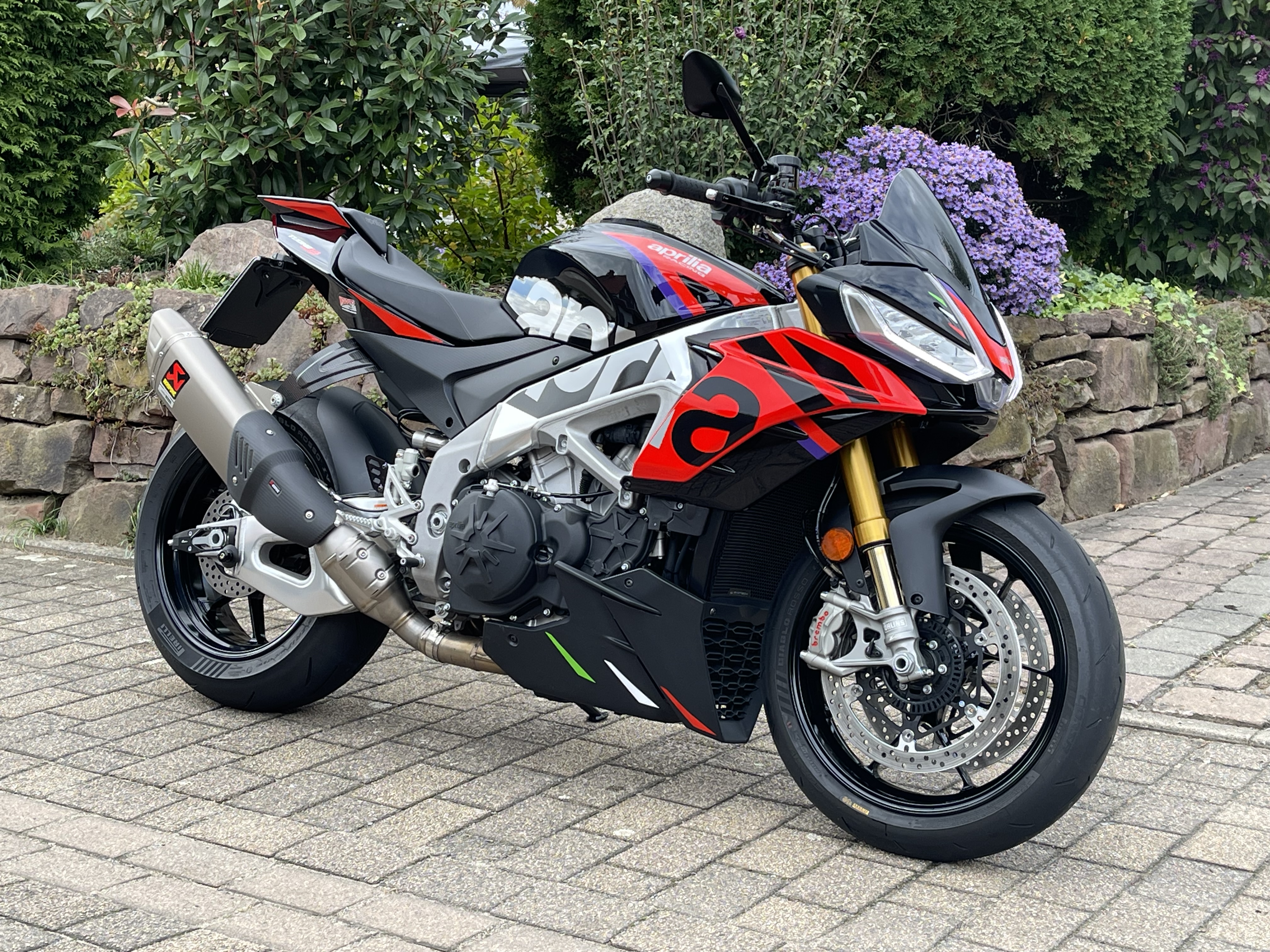
- 2023 Aprilia Tuono V4 Factory
- Manufacturer: Aprilia
- Production: 2002–present
- Class: Naked bike
- Engine: BRP-Rotax V990, 997.62 cc (60.879 cu in) 60° V-twin, 4-stroke, liquid cooled
- Bore / stroke: 97.0 mm × 67.5 mm (3.82 in × 2.66 in)
- Top speed: 240 km/h (149 mph)
- Power: 92 kW (123 hp) @ 9500 rpm
- Torque: 10.3 kg⋅m (75 lb⋅ft) @ 7250 rpm
- Transmission: 6-speed, chain drive
- Suspension: Front: 43mm fully adjustable Showa Upside-down (USD) forks, rear: fully adjustable Boge monoshock
- Brakes: front: Dual 320mm disc with radial mounted Brembo Monobloc M100 calipers, rear: single disc
- Tires: Tubeless radial, front: 120/70 ZR 17, rear: 190/50 ZR 17
- Wheelbase: 1,415 mm (55.7 in)
- Seat height: 820 mm (32 in)
- Weight: 203 kg (448 lb) (dry); 210 kg (460 lb) (wet)
- Fuel capacity: 18 L (4.0 imp gal; 4.8 US gal) including reserve

The Aprilia Tuono is a naked motorcycle manufactured by Aprilia since 2002. It is based on the Aprilia RSV Mille. Its successor, the Aprilia RSV1000R superbike, shares the same engine, gearbox, frame, and partially its suspension. The Tuono was replaced by the Aprilia Tuono V4 R for the 2011 model year, although the V2 model remained in production into that year.

== Design ==
The current Aprilia Tuono is designed as a streetfighter and is equipped with electronic features such as multi-level traction control, ABS, wheelie control, launch control, and the Aprilia Quick Shift (AQS) system. Since its introduction in 2002, the model has undergone numerous updates, although its overall character has largely remained the same.

== Versions ==
=== 2002 Aprilia Tuono R Limited ===
Following its presentation at the 2001 Bologna Motor Show, the Aprilia Tuono was introduced in a limited series of 220 individually numbered units. Known as the Tuono R Limited, it served as a proof of concept for the later RSV Tuono Factory. The model featured the 94.9 kW (129.0 PS; 127.3 hp) engine from the RSV Mille R, a gold-colored frame, and components made from high-end materials such as carbon fibre, Kevlar, and titanium. Equipment included Öhlins Racing suspension, OZ forged alloy wheels, Brembo four-pad brake calipers, and an Aprilia Racing titanium exhaust system with a matching EEPROM.

=== 2002–2005 RSV Tuono ===
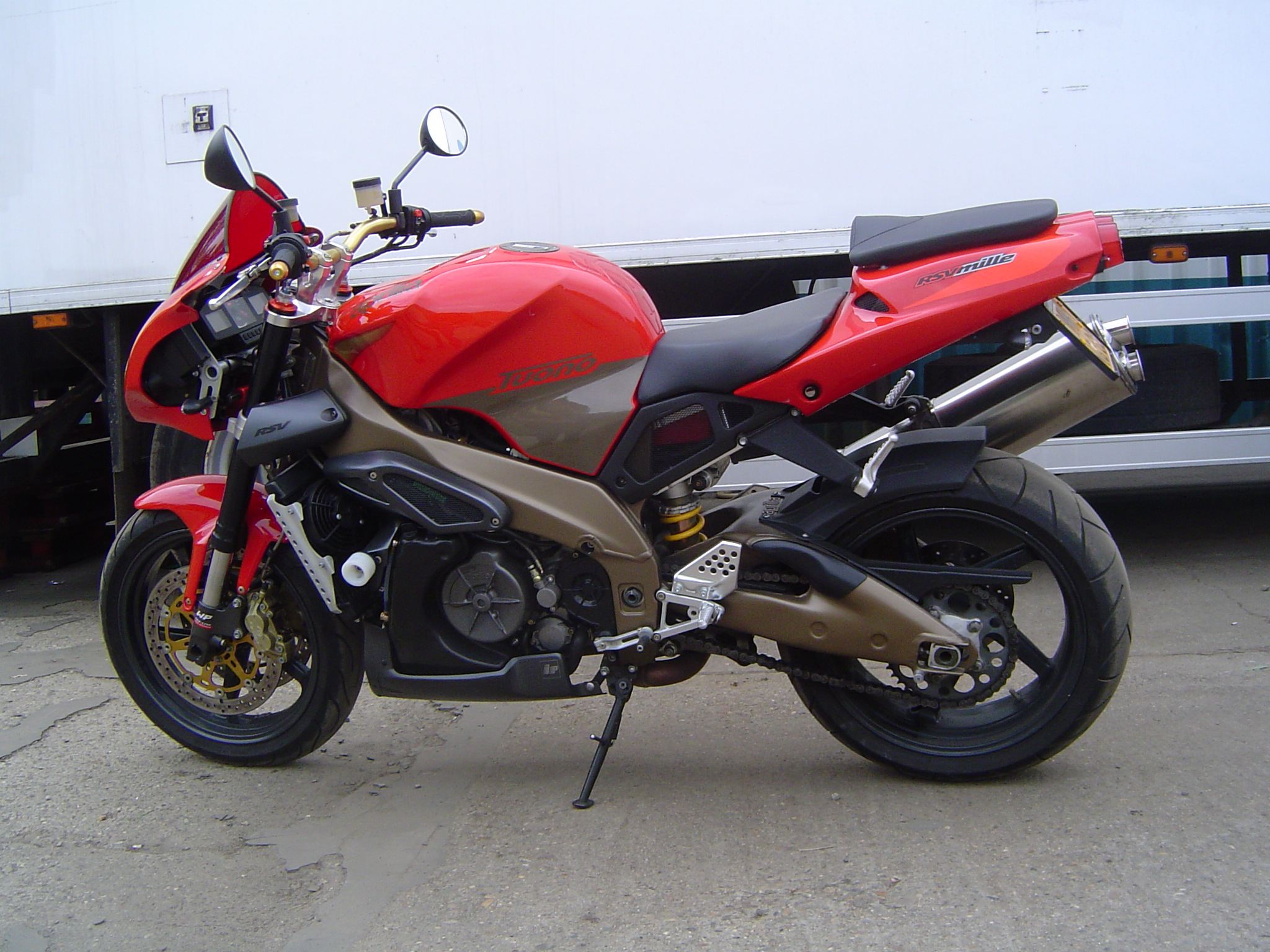
Aprilia RSV Tuono

In the United States, the model was marketed as the Tuono Fighter in 2003. The RSV Tuono traces its origins to the 1998–2003 RSV Mille superbike. The 2003–2005 RSV Tuono used the 2002 Mille frame, engine, suspension, and brakes, with most parts being interchangeable between the Mille and Tuono until the introduction of the RSV 1000 R, which replaced the Mille. A notable difference is that the RSV Tuono was equipped with a steering damper as standard, unlike the RSV Mille. This was intended to reduce the risk of speed wobble under full acceleration, a potential issue due to the motocross-style handlebars mounted on high machined ergal risers, which positioned the rider more upright and placed less weight on the front wheel. The most visible distinction between the two models was the reduced bodywork on the Tuono.

The base model Tuono (known as the Tuono Fighter in the United States for 2003 and as the RSV Tuono for 2004–2005) and the higher-spec Tuono Factory both featured a frame-mounted bikini fairing and body covers, with the base model using plastic and the Factory using carbon fibre. The 2003 Tuono (marketed as the Tuono Fighter in the United States) had a light bronze frame and swingarm, while the 2004 and 2005 models were finished in black. In contrast, the RSV Mille used chrome-finished frames for the base models and black frames for the Racing/Factory models. The Tuono base model was equipped with an adjustable Sachs rear shock absorber and Showa front suspension.

The RSV Tuono was powered by the Austrian-built BRP-Rotax V990 60° V-twin engine, which was also used in several other Aprilia models. The engine featured dual overhead cams, double balance shafts, four valves per cylinder, electronic fuel injection, twin spark ignition, and the same two-into-one exhaust system as the RSV Mille. In the RSV Tuono, the V990 produced 92 kW (125 PS; 123 hp) at 9,500 rpm and 10.3 kg⋅m (101 N⋅m; 75 lb⋅ft) of torque at 7,250 rpm. The fuel tank capacity was 18 L (4.8 US gal), providing a maximum highway range of approximately 280 km (175 mi) before the low-fuel indicator illuminated. Fuel consumption increased significantly with aggressive throttle use.

=== 2003–2005 RSV Tuono Factory ===
The RSV Tuono Factory was a higher-specification version of the standard RSV Tuono, based on the Aprilia RSV Mille R. Compared with the base model, it featured forged alloy wheels, gold-anodized Öhlins Racing front forks, a fully adjustable Öhlins Racing rear monoshock, a fully adjustable Öhlins Racing steering damper, radially mounted Brembo brake calipers, and extensive use of carbon fibre components for weight reduction.

In 2005, Aprilia introduced the Tuono 1000R Limited Edition for the Netherlands market only, restricted to 40 units. This version was based on the Tuono 1000 R and was equipped with a wide range of factory accessories. It featured numerous carbon fibre components, including the upper fairing, tail section, lower spoiler, air intakes, and mudguards, giving the motorcycle a lighter weight and a more technical appearance. The model was also fitted with titanium Akrapovič sport mufflers and stainless-steel manifolds, reducing the exhaust system weight by approximately 45 percent compared with the standard system. The absence of catalytic converters further contributed to the weight reduction. Installation of the Akrapovič system was accompanied by revised engine management software to optimize performance. The exhausts were homologated for road use with removable dB killers, though removing them increased sound output by approximately 10 dB(A).

=== 2006–2010 Tuono 1000 R ===
Aprilia Tuono 1000 R
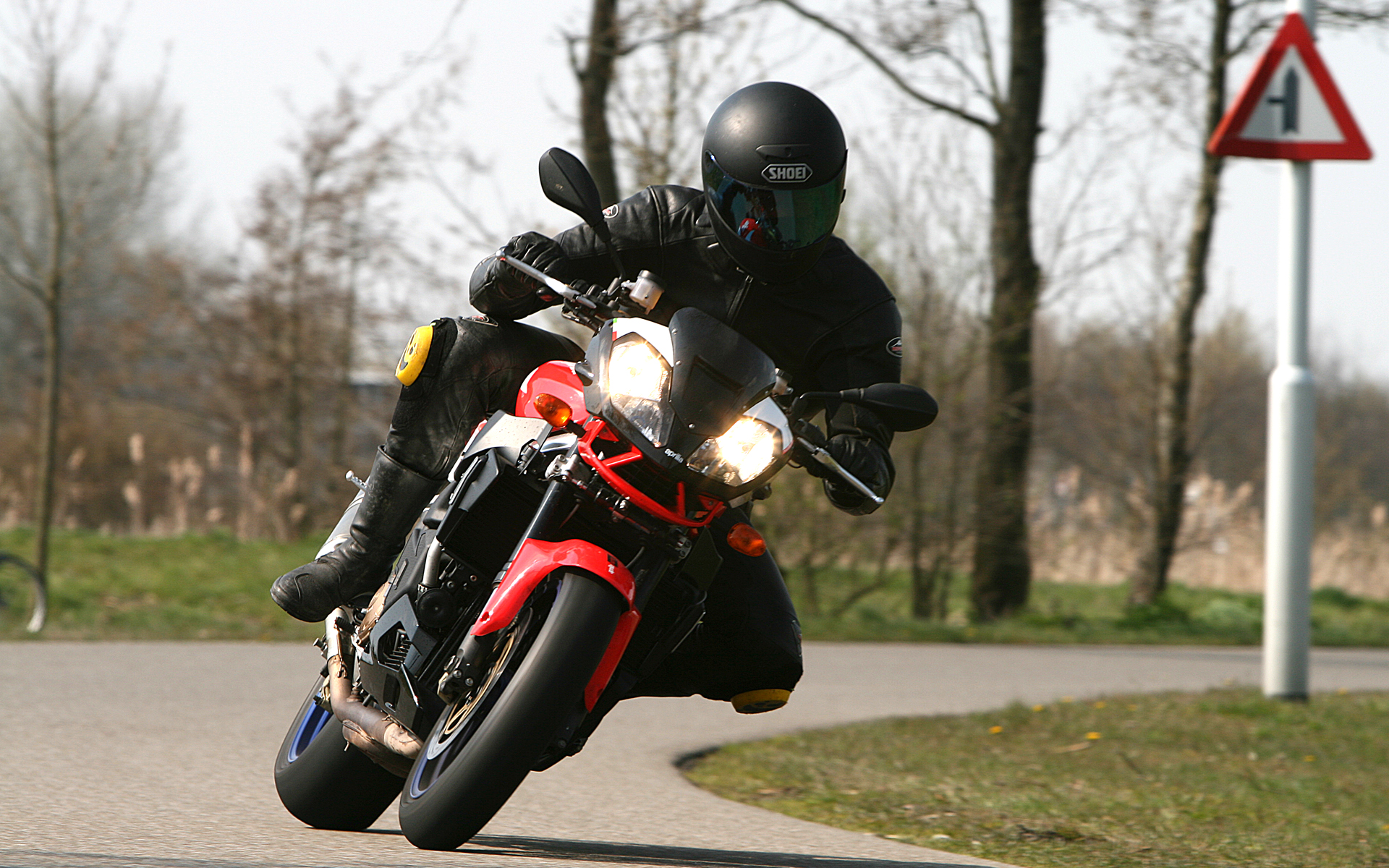
- 2007 Aprilia Tuono 1000 R in 'Rosso Fluo' paint scheme
- Manufacturer: Aprilia
- Production: 2006-2011
- Predecessor: Aprilia RSV Tuono
- Successor: Aprilia Tuono V4 R
- Class: naked bike
- Engine: BRP-Rotax V990, 997.62 cc (60.879 cu in) 60° V-twin, 4-stroke, liquid cooled
- Power: 133 hp (99 kW) @ 9500 rpm
- Torque: 86 lb⋅ft (117 N⋅m) @ 8500 rpm
- Transmission: 6-speed, chain drive
- Suspension: Front: 43mm fully adjustable Showa Upside-down (USD) forks, rear: Sachs monoshock with adjustable preload and rebound damping
- Brakes: front: Dual 320mm disc with radially mounted Brembo calipers, rear: 220mm single disc.
- Tires: Tubeless radial, front: 120/70 ZR 17, rear: 190/50 ZR 17
- Wheelbase: 1,415 mm (55.7 in)
- Seat height: 830 mm (33 in)
- Weight: 185 kg (408 lb) (dry); 207 kg (456 lb) (wet)
- Fuel capacity: 18 litres (4.8 US gal) including 4 litres (1.1 US gal) reserve

The second-generation Tuono, known as the Tuono 1000 R, was based on the 2004–2009 Aprilia RSV1000R superbike. A key technical difference was the rear suspension: while the RSV1000R was equipped with a shock absorber offering adjustable compression, rebound, and preload, the Tuono 1000 R provided only preload and rebound adjustment. This made the stock Tuono less suited for track use compared with the RSV1000R; however, the interchangeability of parts allowed riders to upgrade the suspension if desired.

Other distinctions were primarily cosmetic, including the absence of a full fairing, the use of a superbike-style handlebar instead of clip-ons, and different paint schemes. As with the first-generation Tuono, a steering damper was fitted as standard.

The BRP-Rotax V990 60° V-twin engine received several updates compared with the earlier generation. These included revised gear ratios (a close-ratio gearbox with a longer first gear), larger throttle bodies, a single spark plug per cylinder, minor cosmetic changes, and an increased output of 99.8 kW (135.7 PS; 133.8 hp) at 9,500 rpm. Torque was also increased to 11.9 kg⋅m (117 N⋅m; 86 lb⋅ft) at 8,500 rpm.

The Tuono was offered in two versions: the Tuono 1000 R, the standard model based on the Aprilia RSV1000R, and the Tuono 1000 R Factory, which served as Aprilia's flagship naked motorcycle.

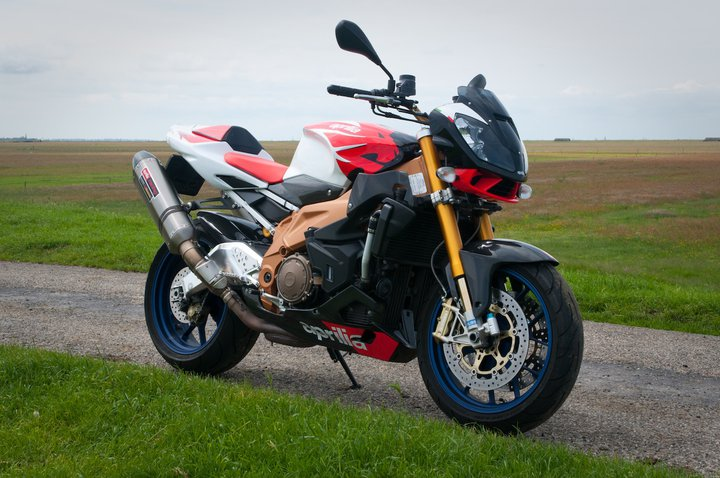
Early 2008 Aprilia Tuono 1000 R Factory

The Tuono 1000 R Factory was the higher-specification version of the Tuono 1000 R. It featured fully adjustable Öhlins Racing front forks and rear monoshock, forged aluminum wheels finished in blue or gold depending on the model year, a gold-finished frame, and a distinctive paint scheme incorporating Aprilia's lion-head graphic on the fuel tank. Extensive use of carbon fibre was employed to reduce weight. The combination of forged wheels and carbon fibre was employed to reduce weight. The combination of forged wheels and carbon fibre components accounted for a 4 kg (9 lb) weight reduction compared with the standard Tuono 1000 R.

=== 2011 Tuono V4 (non-APRC) ===
For the 2012 model year, Aprilia introduced a redesigned Tuono based on the RSV4 superbike, featuring a 1,000 cc 65° V4 engine. In independent dyno testing, it produced 153.6 hp (114.5 kW) and 77.1 lb⋅ft (104.5 N⋅m) of torque at the rear wheel. The model was generally well received, though some criticism was directed at driveline lash attributed to the use of a slipper clutch.

=== 2012–2014 Tuono V4 APRC ===
From 2012, the Tuono V4 was offered with Aprilia's APRC (Aprilia Performance Ride Control) system, which included eight-level traction control, three-level wheelie control, and three-level launch control. For the 2014 model year, refinements included an enlarged 18.5 L fuel tank, a more comfortable saddle, and a three-level race ABS system. Dyno testing measured output at 153.6 hp (114.5 kW) and 77.1 lb⋅ft (104.5 N⋅m) of torque at the rear wheel. Reception was positive overall, with driveline lash from the slipper clutch noted as a recurring criticism.

=== 2015–2016 Tuono V4 1100 ===
For 2015, the Tuono was upgraded with an enlarged 1,077 cc (65.7 cu in) V4 engine. The model was renamed the Tuono V4 1100 RR, with a higher-specification Factory version equipped with Öhlins suspension. Aprilia claimed an output of 175 hp (130 kW) at 11,000 rpm and a wet weight of 472 lb (214 kg). The model introduced a three-level ABS system developed in collaboration with Bosch and three selectable engine maps: Sport, Track, and Race.

=== 2017 Tuono V4 1100 ===
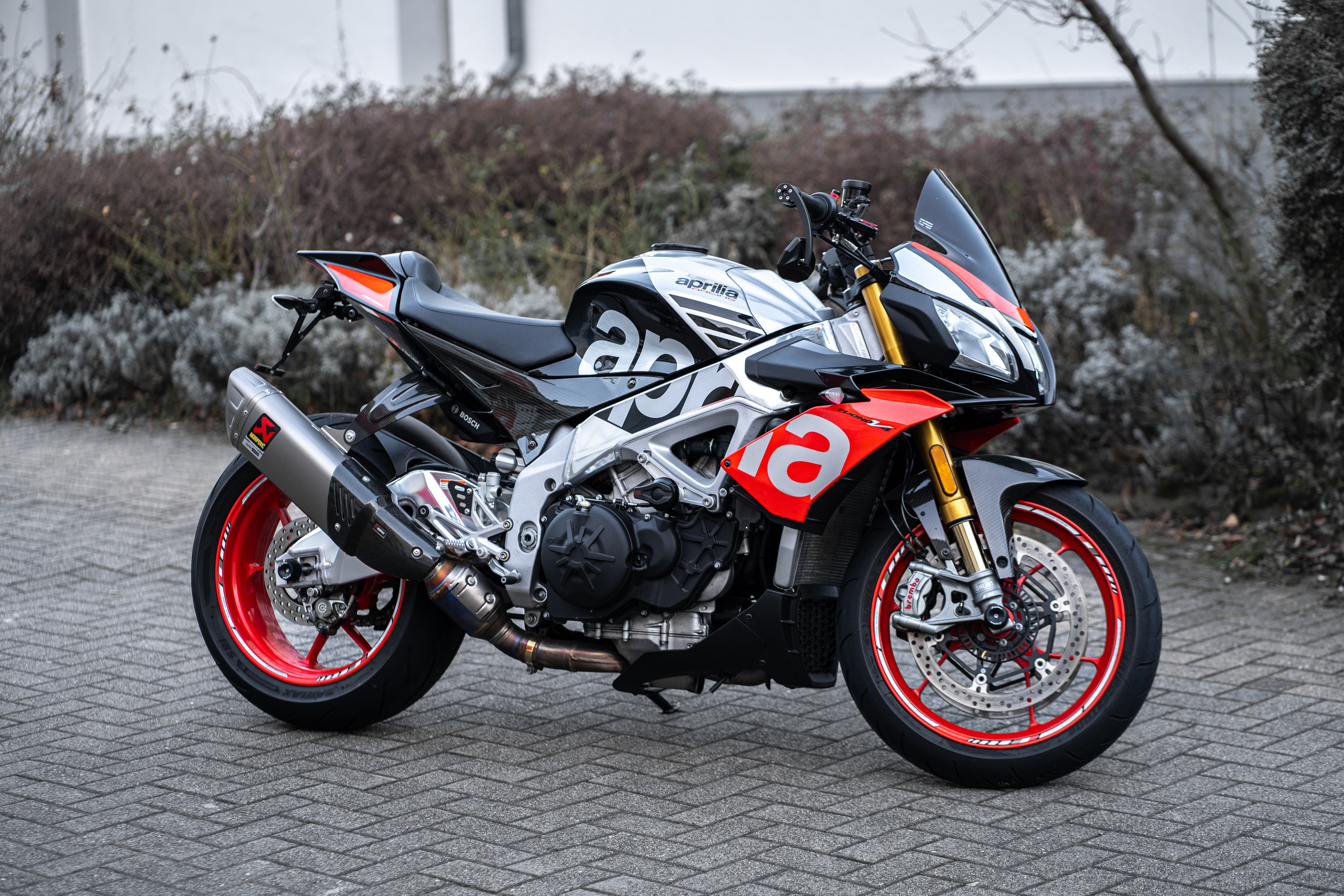
Aprilia Tuono V4 1100 Factory

For 2017, the Tuono V4 1100 was updated with a new TFT instrument display. Aprilia claimed power output of 173–175 hp (129–130 kW) at 11,000 rpm. The Tuono Factory version was also offered in a paint scheme inspired by the Aprilia RS V4.
