= Aprilia SX =

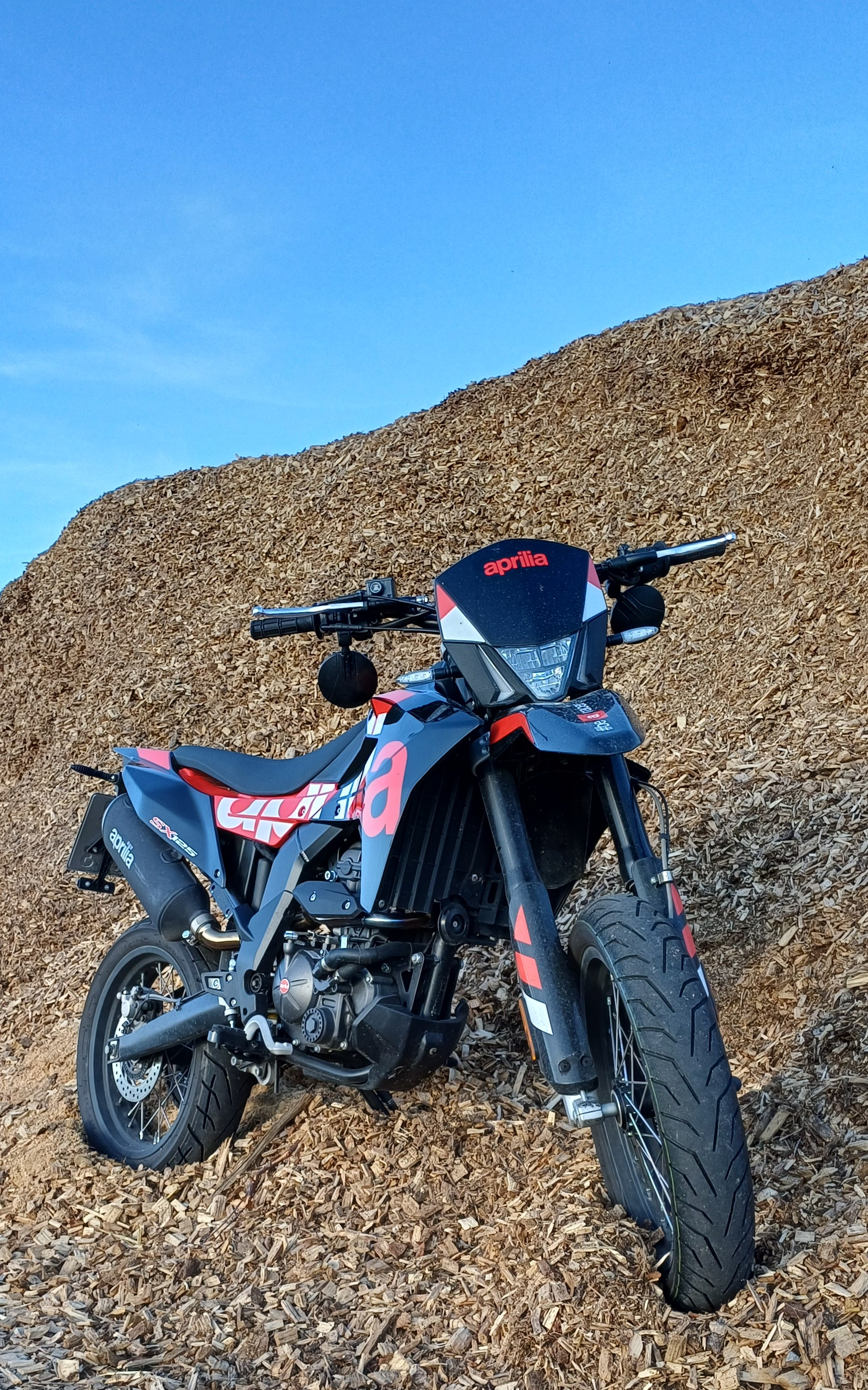
- 2025 Aprilia SX 125
- Manufacturer: Aprilia
- Production: 2006–present
- Predecessor: Aprilia MX
- Class: Supermotard
- Engine: 50–125 cc (3.1–7.6 cu in) liquid-cooled single-cylinder
- Transmission: 6-speed manual
- Suspension: Front: 40 mm hydraulic fork, 195 mm (7.7 in) travel Rear: Hydraulic monoshock, 180 mm (7.1 in) travel
- Brakes: Front: Single 300 mm (12 in) disc, 4-piston caliper Rear: Single 180 mm (7.1 in) disc, 2-piston caliper
- Tires: Front: 100/80-17; Rear: 130/70-17
- Wheelbase: 55.354 in (1,406.0 mm)
- Dimensions: L: 79.68 in (2,024 mm); W: 80.511 in (2,045.0 mm); H: 32.677 in (830.0 mm)

The Aprilia SX is a street motorcycle sold by Aprilia since 2006. It is currently sold only in the 125 cc (7.6 cu in) four-stroke variant.

== Aprilia SX 50 ==
The SX 50 is powered by a single-cylinder two-stroke engine with a nikasil-lined cast-iron cylinder manufactured by Derbi.

=== Engine ===
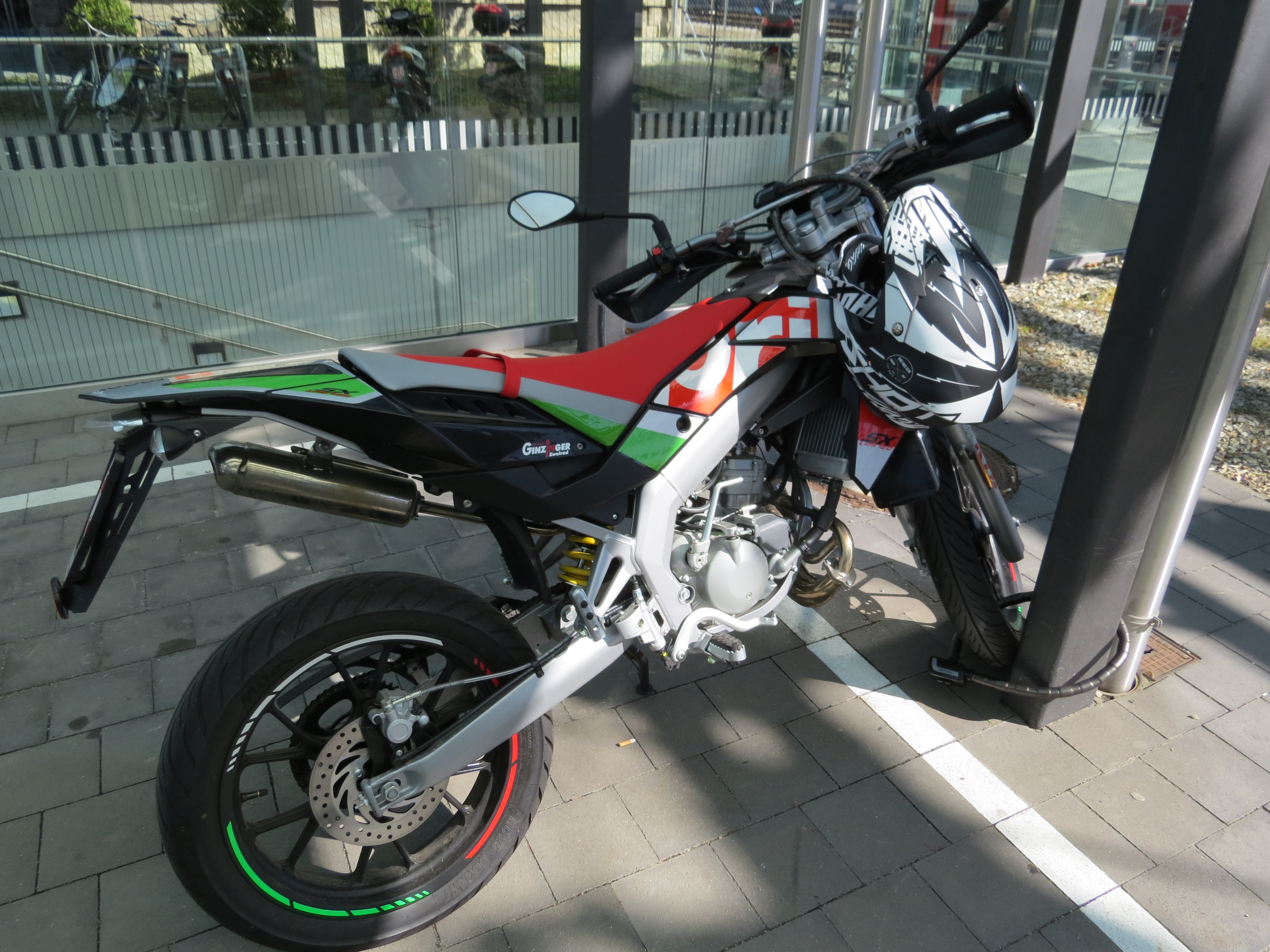
2017 Aprilia SX 50

The Aprilia SX 50 engine is sourced from Derbi/Piaggio. This engine was used in the Derbi Senda DRD/X-Race/X-Treme supermotos, as well as the Derbi GPR 50 and Aprilia RS 50 road bikes. Engine parts from the bikes supermoto can be directly swapped with one another, there are some small differences between the road bike and supermoto engine which ceases the transfer of some external engine parts (exhaust, airbox).

== Aprilia SX 125 ==
The SX 125 was initially sold from 2007 until 2013. It was very similar to the SXV 450 and used the iconic Rotax 122 two-stroke engine. The SX 125 was reintroduced in 2018 though with a four-stroke engine instead of a two-stroke to respect the European emissions standards.
