= Aprilia SXR =

- Aprilia SXR 125 2027
- Manufacturer: Aprilia
- Parent company: Piaggio
- Production: 2020-present
- Assembly: Baramati, India
- Class: Scooter
- Engine: 49 cc (3.0 cu in) Piaggio i-get 125 cc (7.6 cu in) Piaggio i-get 160 cc (9.8 cu in) Piaggio i-get
- Ignition type: Capacitor discharge electronic ignition (CDI)
- Transmission: CVT automatic; gear final drive
- Frame type: Tubular steel spine
- Suspension: Front; Hydraulic telescopic

The Aprilia SXR is a scooter from the Italian manufacturer Aprilia.

== History ==
Previewed at the Auto Expo at Delhi in February 2020, production takes place in the factory Piaggio of Baramati in end of November.

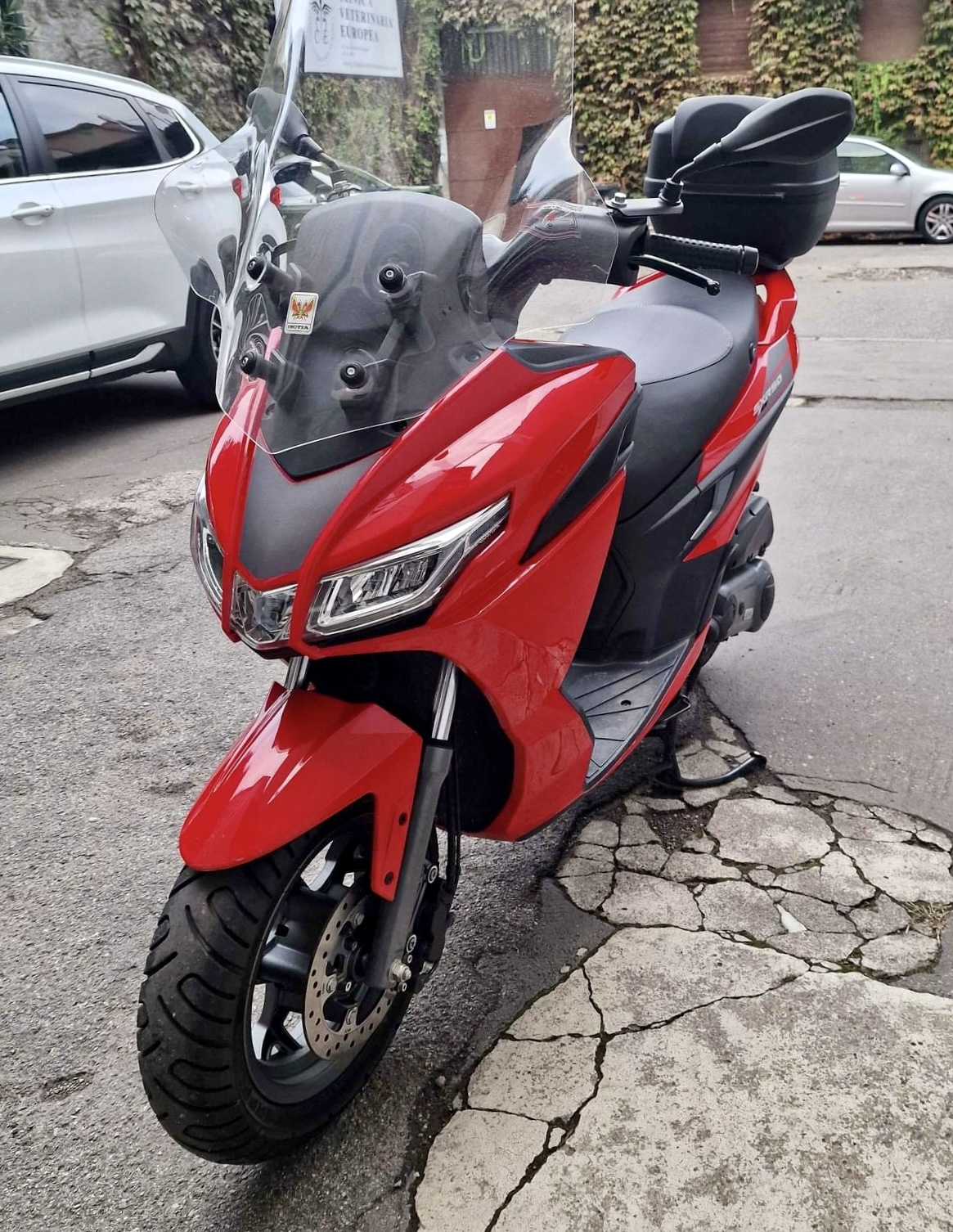
Aprilia SXR 50

The SXR was initially launched in the Indian market in the displacement from 160 cm^{3}, followed by two more cubicles, the 50 that made its debut in April 2021 and 125 in July.

All engines are characterized by having a single cylinder a cycle eight four stroke, of Piaggio derivation of the I-Get family and approved Euro 5, equipped with a system of electronic injection and characterized by distribution SOHC 3-valve.

The frame is composed of a single-cradle structure in tubes of steel assisted by elements in pressed sheet metal. At the front there is one telescopic fork hydraulic while at the rear axle a single shock absorber, adjustable in 5 positions. The gearbox is an automatic CVT with continuous variation.

On the 50 cm^{3} version the circles are 12” and fit tires measuring 120/70. On this engine, the engine delivers a maximum torque of 3.3 Nm at 6250 rpm and a power of 2.4 Kw at 7000 rpm. The braking system consists of a 220 mm front disc with a double piston caliper and a 140 mm rear drum.

Only version 50 is imported on the European market.

=== Aprilia SXR GT 125 and 175 (2026-present) ===
Aprilia SXR GT 175

In October 2026, Aprilia launched its 2027 lineup in India, consisting of the SXR GT 125 and GT 175. The new 175 engine replaces the previous 160. The new version features larger 120/70 R14 wheels, new LED headlights, and a new 5-inch TFT instrument cluster, as well as new color schemes inspired by the Aprilia RSV4 sports bike.

The SXR GT 125 is equipped with an updated version of the Piaggio i-get single-cylinder engine; displacement remains at 124.45 cm³, but power increases to 10.6 hp at 7,400 rpm and maximum torque to 10.4 Nm at 6,200 rpm. It is BS6 Phase 2 certified. The braking system consists of a 220 mm front disc and a 140 mm rear drum with a Combined Braking System (CBS).

The SXR GT 175 features the new Piaggio i-get 174.7 cm³ single-cylinder, three-valve engine with electronic fuel injection, which delivers 13.27 hp at 7,200 rpm and 14.14 Nm at 6,000 rpm, and is equipped with a 220 mm front disc brake and a 140 mm rear drum brake. ABS comes standard.
