= Aprilia Mana 850 =

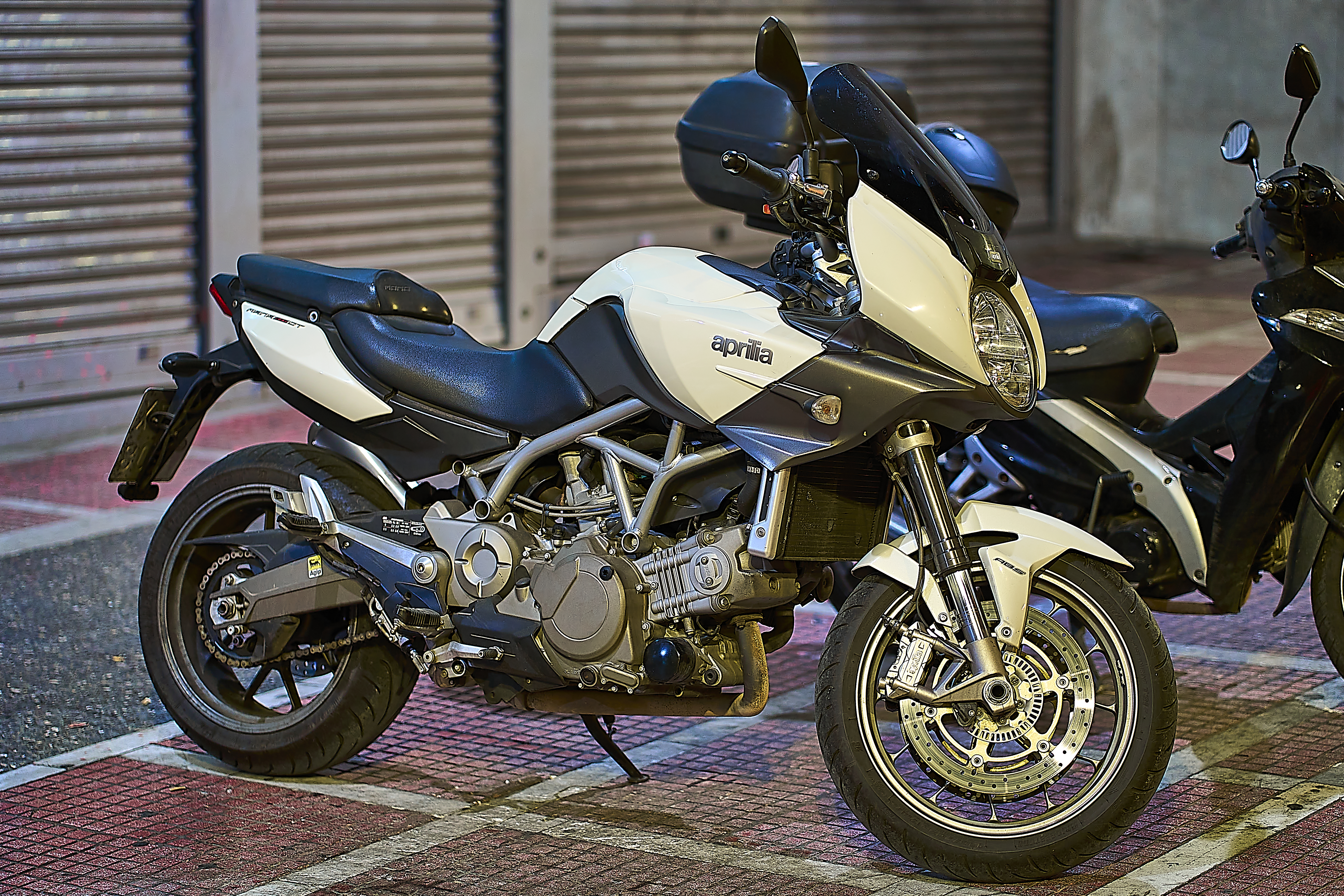
- Manufacturer: Aprilia
- Parent company: Piaggio
- Production: 2007–2016
- Class: Standard / Naked bike
- Engine: 839.3 cc (51.22 cu in) liquid-cooled SOHC 90° V-twin
- Bore / stroke: 88 mm × 69 mm (3.5 in × 2.7 in)
- Power: 75.1 hp (56.0 kW) @ 8,000 rpm
- Torque: 56.4 lb⋅ft (76.5 N⋅m) @ 5,000 rpm
- Transmission: Electronically controlled CVT with chain final drive
- Suspension: Front: 43 mm fork, 120 mm (4.7 in) travel Rear: swingarm, adjustable preload and damping, 125 mm (4.9 in) travel
- Brakes: Front: 2 × 320 mm (13 in) discs, 4-piston radial calipers Rear: 260 mm (10 in) disc
- Tires: Front: 120/70–17; Rear: 180/55–17
- Rake, trail: 103 mm (4.1 in)
- Wheelbase: 1,463 mm (57.6 in)
- Dimensions: L: 2,080 mm (82 in); W: 800 mm (31 in); H: 1,130 mm (44 in)
- Seat height: 800 mm (31 in)
- Weight: 234 kg (516 lb) (wet)
- Fuel capacity: 16 L (3.5 imp gal; 4.2 US gal)
- Related: Gilera GP800

The Aprilia Mana 850 is an automatic transmission motorcycle made by Aprilia from 2007 to 2016.

The Mana has an 839.3 cc (51.22 cu in) 90° V-twin engine with a continuously variable transmission (CVT). The transmission has three mode settings: Sport, Touring, and Rain. Sport mode provides maximum power, engine braking, and torque; Touring mode scales back the responsiveness and improves fuel savings; Rain mode reduces torque by 25%. The transmission can also be set to Manual (gearbox) and shifted using the standard foot-shift or paddle-shifters mounted on the left grip. The instrument panel includes a gear indicator. The Mana 850 is also available partially faired, called the Mana 850 GT.

Sport Rider magazine tested the Mana 850 at 13.49 sec. at 97.72 mph (157.27 km/h) over the 1/4 mile (400 m). Motor Cycle News described it as "a sort of half-scooter, half motorcycle designed to be the bike for all occasions." What Bike? magazine says the Mana is "small, light, comfy, and a dream to ride in town." A "Motorcycle.com" reviewer was very positive, saying, "I didn’t really expect the Mana to be much of a sportbike, but it is."
