= Ivano Beggio =

Italian entrepreneur

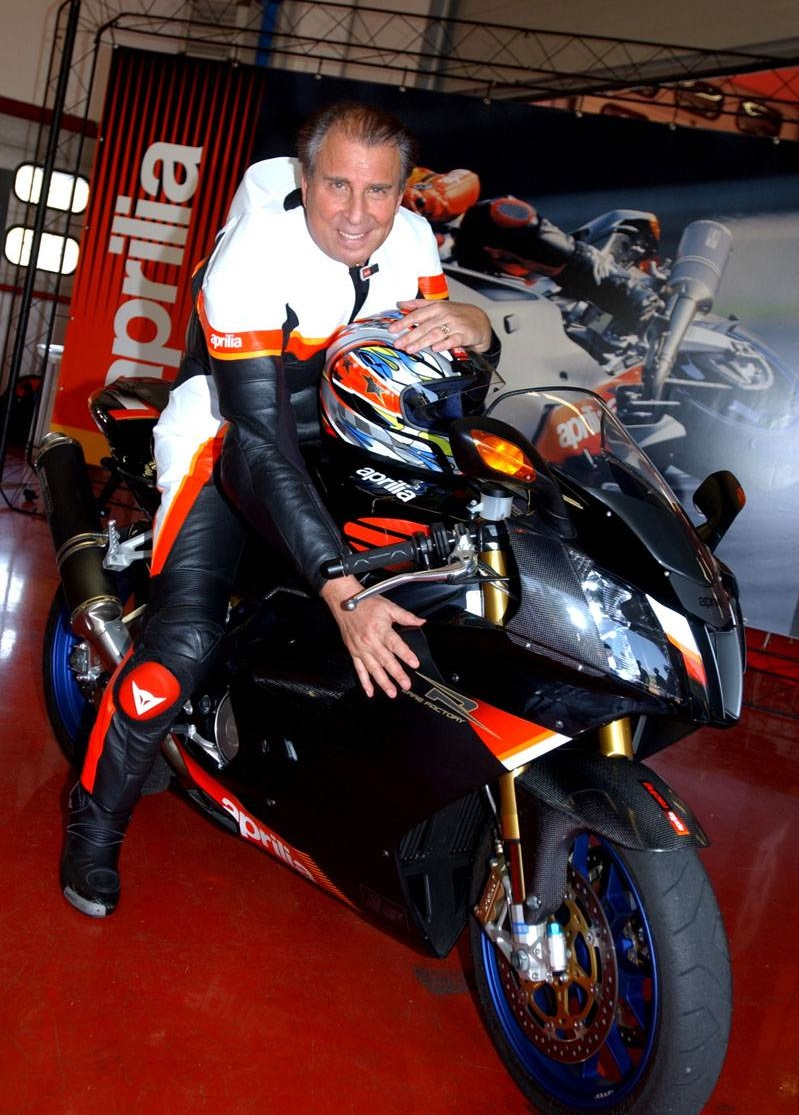
- Beggio in 2005
- Born: Ivano Beggio; 31 August 1944; Rio San Martino, Venice, Italy
- Died: 12 March 2018 (aged 73); Italy

Ivano Beggio (31 August 1944 – 12 March 2018) was an Italian engineer and businessman who was the founder, owner and president of Aprilia.
