= Aprilia Area 51 =

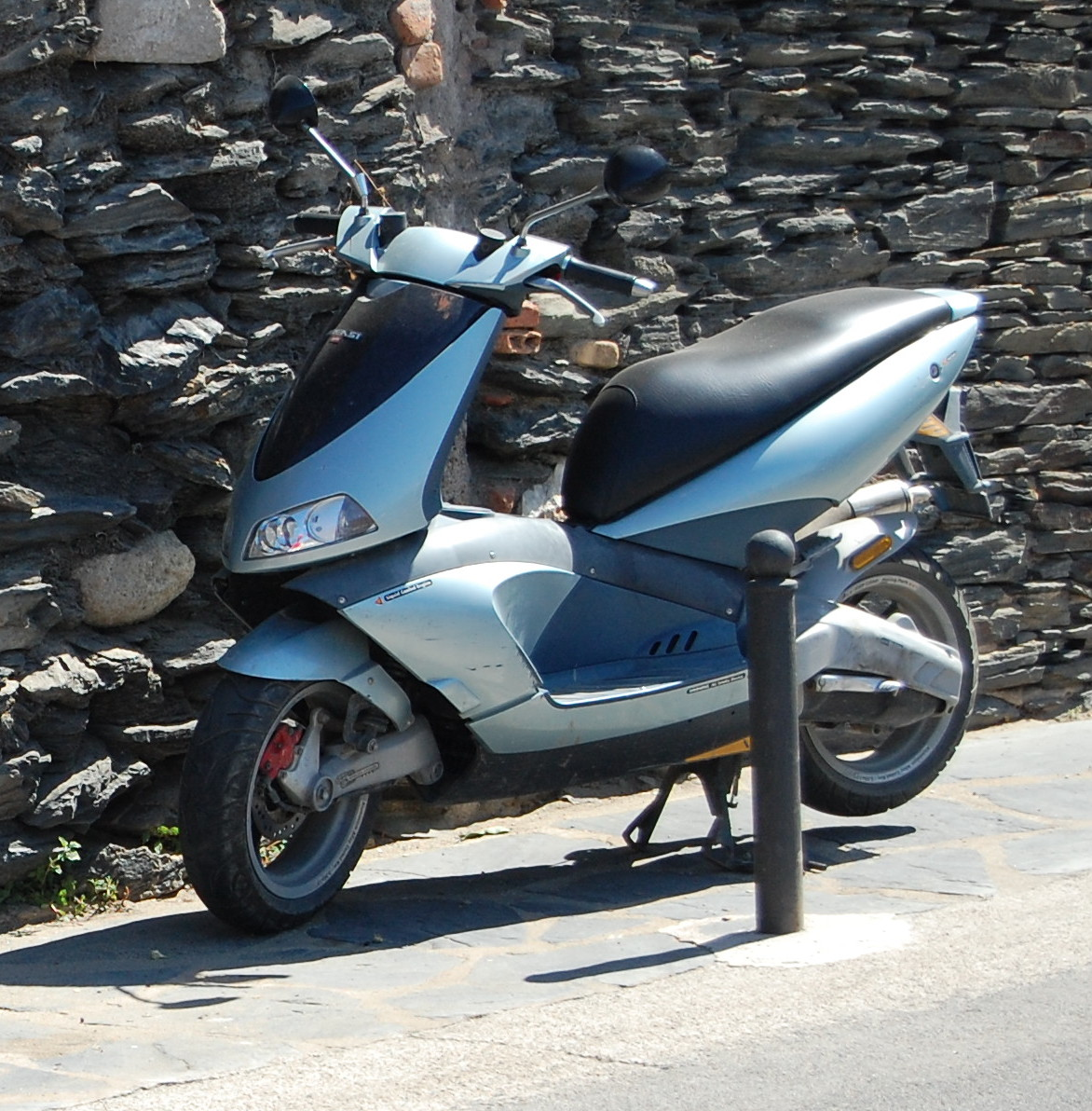
- Manufacturer: Aprilia
- Production: 1998–2002
- Class: Scooter
- Engine: Minarelli horizontal LC 49 cc (3.0 cu in) two-stroke
- Top speed: 45 km/h (28 mph) (restricted)
- Power: 3 kW (4.0 hp)
- Transmission: CVT automatic
- Frame type: Tubular steel spine
- Suspension: Front: Single wishbone Rear: Monoshock

The Aprilia Area 51 is a scooter from the Italian manufacturer Aprilia, from 1998 to 2002.

== History ==
Presented at the Munich Motor Show in 1998, the Area 51 is a scooter powered by a single-cylinder 49 cc two-stroke engine.

The name Area 51 refers to the US military base of the same name located in Nevada.

The power is transmitted to the rear wheel via a transmission consisting of a centrifugal clutch connected to a continuously variable CVT gearbox by means of a belt. The wheels are 13 inches and measure 130/60, while the braking system consists of two discs on both wheels.

The frame is made up of an aluminum structure to which a single wishbone suspension is anchored at the front mounted in the lower part of the frame, in place of the classic fork as on traditional scooters. Other special features of the scooter are the electric dashboard with digital indicator instead of the speedometer and LED fuel level and engine temperature gauge. Also for the design of the design and the shape of the fairing it was done in the wind tunnel.
