= Aprilia =

Italian motorcycle manufacturer

Coordinates: 45.5458747°N 12.0709374°E

- Type: Subsidiary
- Industry: Motorcycle
- Founded: 1945; 81 years ago
- Founder: Alberto Beggio
- Headquarters: Noale, Italy
- Area served: Worldwide
- Key people: Rocco Sabelli (CEO)
- Products: Motorcycles & Scooters
- Parent: Piaggio Group
- Website: aprilia.com

Aprilia is an Italian motorcycle and scooter manufacturer in Noale, Italy, founded by Alberto Beggio.

== History ==
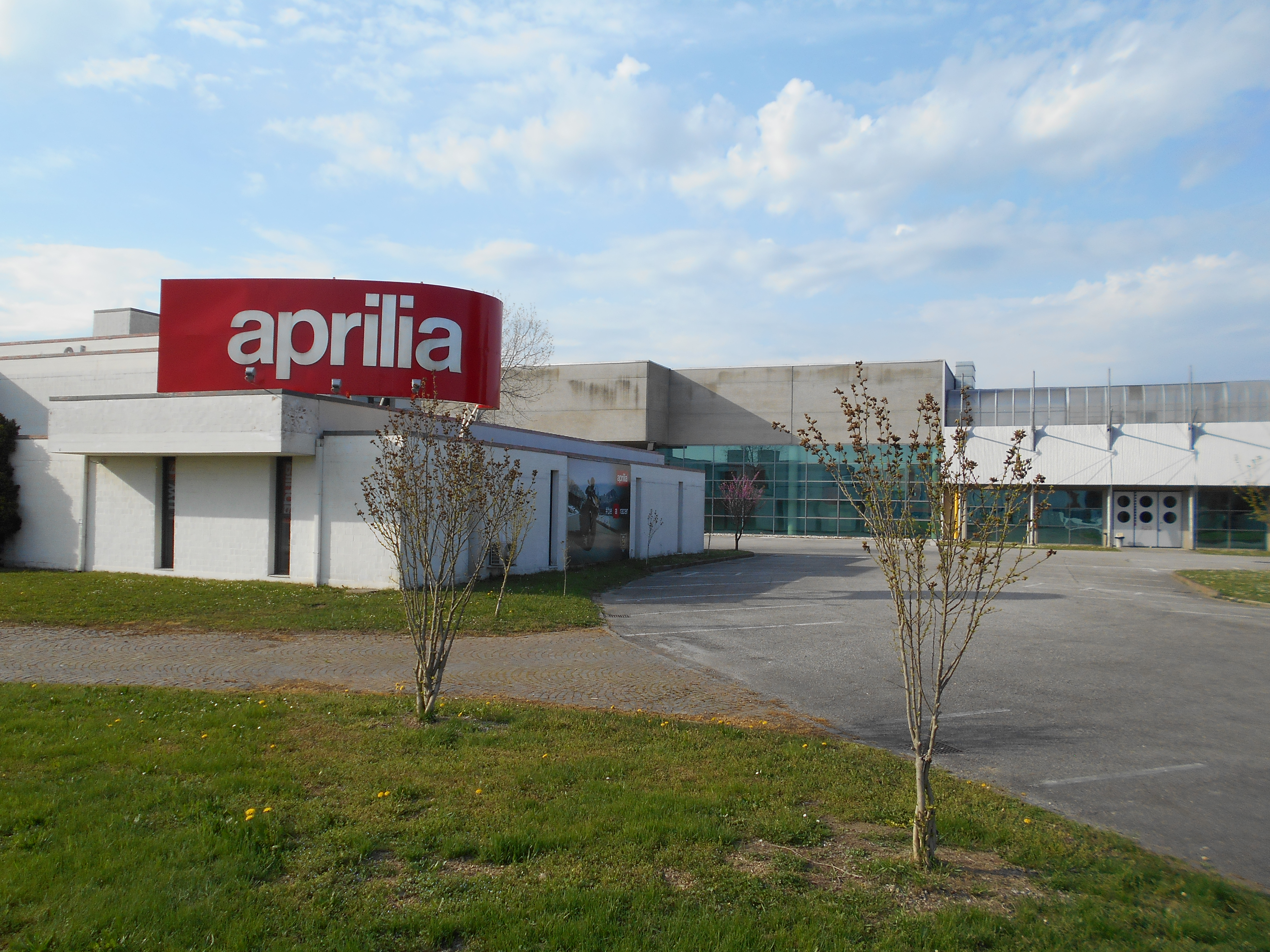
Aprilia plant in Scorzè, Venice

=== Early days ===
Aprilia, named after the pre-war Lancia Aprilia, was founded after the Second World War by Cavaliere Alberto Beggio as a bicycle production factory at Noale, Italy, in the province of Venice. Alberto's son, Ivano Beggio, took over the helm of the company in 1968 and constructed a 50 cc "motorcycle". The first production Aprilia mopeds were named Colibrì, Daniela, and Packi. Aprilia later produced a motocross bike in 1970 called the Scarabeo. Produced until the end of the 1970s, the Scarabeo came in 50 and 125 cc versions.

In 1977, Ivan Alborghetti from Milan, Italy won the Italian 125 and 250 cc motocross championships on Aprilia motorcycles. In 1978 125cc Motocross World Championship, Alborghetti closed the season with a third-place result in the Swiss Grand Prix and sixth place overall in the World Championship. In the 1980s, Aprilia added enduro, trials and road bikes of between 50 and 600 cc and in 1981, Aprilia introduced the TL320 trials machine. In 1983, Aprilia launched the St 125 road bike and in 1984, they launched an improved model called STX as well as an enduro, called the ET 50.

In 1985, Aprilia started outsourcing engines for some models to the Austrian company Rotax. In 1985 Aprilia launched a 125 STX and 350 STX. In 1986, Aprilia launched the AF1, a small sports model; and the Tuareg, a large tanked bike for African rallies like the Dakar Rally. Aprilia factory rider Philippe Berlatier contended for the trials world championship reaching fifth place, and Loris Reggiani rode an Aprilia GP 250 with Rotax engine to sixth place in the road racing World Championship. Two seasons later, on August 30, 1987, at San Marino Grand Prix in Misano Loris Reggiani's AF1 won the first World Speed Championship.

In 1990, Aprilia launched the Pegaso 600, a road bike derived from off-road mechanics. Later, in 1992 Aprilia rider Alessandro Gramigni won the World 125 Road Racing Championship title. Also in 1992, Tommy Ahvala won the World Trials Championship on an Aprilia Climber. Since then, Aprilia has 124 times won 125 and 250 cc class Grand Prix, 15 Road Racing World Championship titles, and 16 European speed titles. Many world champions started on Aprilia such as Biaggi, Capirossi, Gramigni, Locatelli, Sakata and Rossi.

In 1995, Aprilia commissioned Philippe Starck to design the Motò which was shown in New York's Modern Art Museum. Also in 1995, Aprilia launched the two stroke RS 125 and RS 250 sports bikes. In 1998, Aprilia launched the RSV Mille, a 1000cc V-Twin Superbike, and the Falco, a 1000cc V-Twin sport tourer with emphasis on sport. Both bikes used a variation of a Rotax 1000cc engine.

In 1999, Aprilia entered World Superbike Championship racing with its RSV Mille, and during 2000, Aprilia acquired Moto-Guzzi and Laverda, both historic heritage Italian marques. In 2000, Aprilia launched the 50 cc DiTech (Direct Injection Technology) two stroke engine for scooters which provides high mileage and low emissions, and also the RST Futura, a sport tourer, and the ETV 1000 Caponord; an adventure touring motorcycle. Both of these latter two motorcycles used a variation of the Rotax 1000 cc V-Twin.

Most recently, in 2003, Aprilia launched the RSV Mille Tuono which was essentially an RSV Mille with motocross-style high handlebars and only a small headlight fairing. Most of the major motorcycle magazines picked it for the best bike of the year. In 2004, Aprilia was acquired by Piaggio & C. SpA, to form the world's fourth largest motorcycle group with 1.5 billion Euro in sales, an annual production capacity of over 600,000 vehicles, and a presence in 50 countries.

With the acquisition by Piaggio, the new President of Aprilia is Roberto Colaninno (President of Piaggio & C.), and the managing director is Rocco Sabelli. The son of the founder, Ivano Beggio, was the Honorary President and died on 13 March 2018. On 15 August 2010, Aprilia became the most successful motorcycle racing brand in history, surpassing fellow Italian MV Agusta with a record 276th victory.

== Timeline ==
=== Motorcycles ===
Alberto's son, Ivano Beggio, took over the helm of the company in 1968 and constructed a 50 cc "motorcycle".

The first production Aprilia mopeds were named "Colibrì", "Daniela", and "Packi".

In the 1980s, Aprilia added enduro, trials and road bikes of between 50 and 600 cc.

In 1981, Aprilia introduced the TL320 trials machine.

In 1983, Aprilia launched the St 125 road bike.

In 1984, they launched an improved model called STX, as well as an enduro, called the ET 50.

In 1985, Aprilia started outsourcing engines for some models to the Austrian company Rotax.

In 1985 Aprilia launched a 125 STX and 350 STX.

In 1990, Aprilia launched the Pegaso 600, a road bike derived from off-road mechanics.

=== Scooters ===
In the 1990s, Aprilia entered the scooter market starting in 1990 with Italy's first all-plastic scooter, the Amico.

In 1992, Aprilia introduced the Amico LK and the two stroke Pegaso 125, both with catalytic converters.

In 1993, Aprilia launched a large diameter wheel scooter reusing the name Scarabeo with a four-stroke, four-valve engine.

Later, Aprilia launched more scooters such as the Leonardo, the SR and the Gulliver.

In 1995, Aprilia commissioned Philippe Starck to design the Motò which was shown in New York's Modern Art Museum.

In 2000, Aprilia launched the 50 cc DiTech (Direct Injection Technology) two stroke engine for scooters which provides high mileage and low emissions.

=== Sportbikes ===
Aprilia produced a motocross bike in 50 and 125 cc versions in the 1970s called the Scarabeo.

Since in the 1980s, Aprilia has also produced large sportbikes such as the 1,000 cc V-twin RSV Mille and the V4 RSV4.

In 1986, Aprilia launched the AF1, a small sports model; and the Tuareg, a large tanked bike for African rallies like the Dakar Rally.

Also in 1995, Aprilia launched the two stroke RS 125 and RS 250 sports bikes.

In 1998, Aprilia launched the RSV Mille, a 1000cc V-Twin Superbike, and the Falco, a 1000cc V-Twin sport tourer with emphasis on sport. Both bikes used a variation of a Rotax 1000cc engine.

In 2000, Aprilia launched the RST Futura, a sport tourer, and the ETV 1000 Caponord; an adventure touring motorcycle. Both of these two motorcycles used a variation of the Rotax 1000 cc V-Twin.

Most recently, in 2003, Aprilia launched the RSV Mille Tuono which was essentially an RSV Mille with motocross-style high handlebars and only a small headlight fairing. Most of the major motorcycle magazines picked it for the best bike of the year.

== Operation ==
=== Acquisition ===
During 2000, Aprilia acquired Moto Guzzi and Laverda, both historic heritage Italian marques.

=== Ownership ===
In 2004, Aprilia was acquired by Piaggio & C. SpA, to form the world's fourth largest motorcycle group with 1.5 billion Euro in sales, an annual production capacity of over 600,000 vehicles, and a presence in 50 countries.

With the acquisition by Piaggio, the new President of Aprilia is Roberto Colaninno (President of Piaggio & C.), and the managing director is Rocco Sabelli. The son of the founder, Ivano Beggio, was the Honorary President and died on 13 March 2018.

== Racing ==
Aprilia Racing
- 2026 name: Aprilia Racing Monster Energy
- Base: Scorzè, Italy
- Principal: Massimo Rivola
- Racing manager: Paolo Bonora
- Rider(s): MotoGP: 89. Jorge Martin; 72. Marco Bezzecchi; 32. Lorenzo Savadori (test rider)
- Motorcycle: Aprilia RS-GP
- Tyres: Michelin
- Riders' Championships: –

Despite being a relatively small company by global motorcycling standards, Aprilia is very active in motorcycle sports.

Aprilia has contested many road racing formulae, including the now-defunct 125 cc, 250 cc and 500 cc Grand Prix classes of FIM World Championships.

Aprilia have also been in and out of the MotoGP and Superbike World Championship – as a factory team and a constructor, having partnered with Gresini Racing (from 2015 to 2021) and Trackhouse Racing (since 2024) – alongside other commitments.

=== Riders' championships ===
Year	Class	Champion	Motorcycle
1992	125cc	(Italy) Alessandro Gramigni	Aprilia RS125R
1994	125cc	(Japan) Kazuto Sakata	Aprilia RS125R
1994	250cc	(Italy) Max Biaggi	Aprilia RSV 250
1995	250cc	(Italy) Max Biaggi	Aprilia RSV 250
1996	250cc	(Italy) Max Biaggi	Aprilia RSV 250
1997	125cc	(Italy) Valentino Rossi	Aprilia RS125R
1998	125cc	(Japan) Kazuto Sakata	Aprilia RS125R
1998	250cc	(Italy) Loris Capirossi	Aprilia RSV 250
1999	250cc	(Italy) Valentino Rossi	Aprilia RSV 250
2000	125cc	(Italy) Roberto Locatelli	Aprilia RS125R
2002	125cc	(France) Arnaud Vincent	Aprilia RS125R
2002	250cc	(Italy) Marco Melandri	Aprilia RSV 250
2003	250cc	(San Marino) Manuel Poggiali	Aprilia RSV 250
2006	125cc	(Spain) Álvaro Bautista	Aprilia RS125R
2006	250cc	(Spain) Jorge Lorenzo	Aprilia RSW 250
2007	125cc	(Hungary) Gábor Talmácsi	Aprilia RS125R
2007	250cc	(Spain) Jorge Lorenzo	Aprilia RSA 250
2009	125cc	(Spain) Julián Simón	Aprilia RSA 125
2011	125cc	(Spain) Nicolás Terol	Aprilia RSA 125

=== Manufacturers' championships ===
- 250cc class
  - 1995, 1998, 1999, 2002, 2003, 2006, 2007, 2008, 2009
- 125cc class
  - 1996, 1997, 2002, 2003, 2004, 2006, 2007, 2008, 2009, 2011

=== Superbike World Championship (SBK) ===
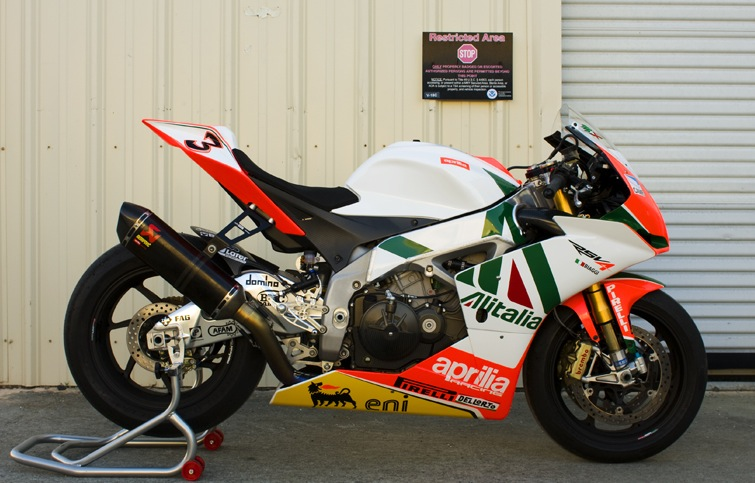
Aprilia RSV4 Factory race bike

Aprilia entered the Superbike World Championship in 1999 using a homologation special version of their V-twin road bike RSV Mille.

They were third in the riders' championship in 2000 with rider Troy Corser, and third in manufacturers' points and fourth in rider points both in 2001 with Corser and in 2002 with Noriyuki Haga. Aprilia retired from the series at the end of that season.

In February 2008, Aprilia debuted a V-4 superbike, the RSV4, for the 2009 Superbike World Championship.

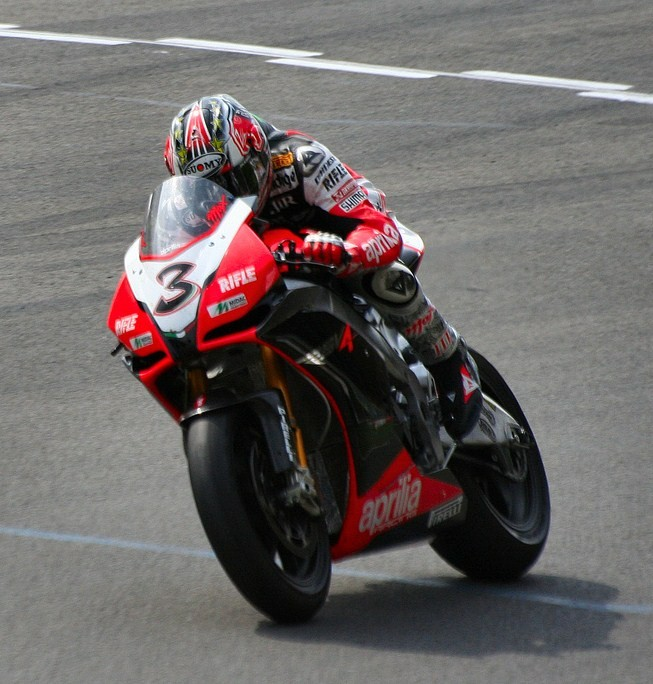
Max Biaggi rides the RSV4

Aprilia won its first Superbike world championship in 2010 with Max Biaggi, claiming both the riders and the manufacturers titles.

==== Riders' championships ====
Year	Champion	Motorcycle
2010	(Italy) Max Biaggi	Aprilia RSV4 1000
2012	(Italy) Max Biaggi	Aprilia RSV4 Factory
2014	(France) Sylvain Guintoli	Aprilia RSV4 Factory

==== Manufacturers' championships ====
- 2010, 2012, 2013, 2014

=== SuperMoto World Championship ===
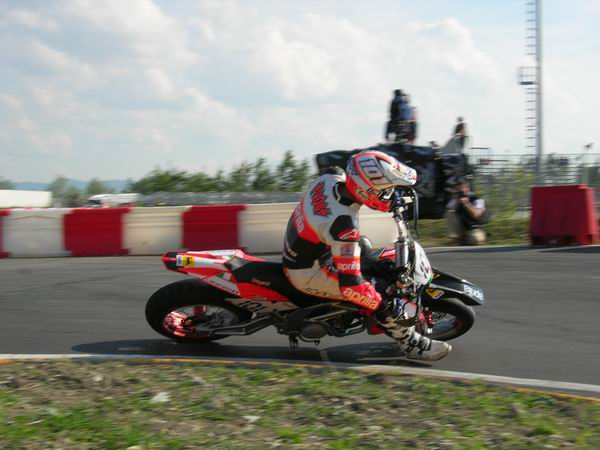
Thierry Van Den Bosch riding the SXV 450 in 2006

Aprilia debuted in the FIM Supermoto World Championship in 2004 and since then it has won many titles in both S1 and S2 classes.

==== Riders' championships ====
Year	Class	Champion	Motorcycle
2004	S2	(France) Jerome Giraudo	Aprilia SXV 450
2006	S2	(France) Thierry Van Den Bosch	Aprilia SXV 450
2011	S1	(France) Adrien Chareyre	Aprilia MXV-S 450

==== Manufacturers' championships ====
- S2 class: 2006, 2007
- S1 class: 2008, 2011

=== Motocross World Championship ===
Aprilia made their international racing debut in the Motocross World Championship competing in the 125cc class from 1976 until 1981 with a best result being a fifth place in the 1979 season with rider Corrado Maddi.

== Results ==
=== MotoGP results ===
==== By rider ====
Year	Class	Team name	Bike	Riders	Races	Wins	Podiums	Poles	F. laps	Points	Pos.
2022	MotoGP	Aprilia Racing	Aprilia RS-GP	(Spain) Maverick Vinales	20	0	3	0	0	122	11th
2022	MotoGP	Aprilia Racing	Aprilia RS-GP	(Spain) Aleix Espargaró	20	1	6	2	2	212	4th
2023	MotoGP	Aprilia Racing	Aprilia RS-GP	(Spain) Maverick Viñales	20	0	3	1	1	204	7th
2023	MotoGP	Aprilia Racing	Aprilia RS-GP	(Spain) Aleix Espargaró	20	2	3	1	2	206	6th
2023	MotoGP	Aprilia Racing	Aprilia RS-GP	(Italy) Lorenzo Savadori	3	0	0	0	0	9 (12)	24th
2024	MotoGP	Aprilia Racing	Aprilia RS-GP	(Spain) Maverick Viñales	19	1	1	1	1	189	7th
2024	MotoGP	Aprilia Racing	Aprilia RS-GP	(Spain) Aleix Espargaró	19	0	0	2	1	134	11th
2024	MotoGP	Aprilia Racing	Aprilia RS-GP	(Italy) Lorenzo Savadori	3	0	0	0	0	0 (0)	28th
2025	MotoGP	Aprilia Racing	Aprilia RS-GP	(Spain) Jorge Martin	7	0	0	0	0	34	21st
2025	MotoGP	Aprilia Racing	Aprilia RS-GP	(Italy) Marco Bezzecchi	22	3	9	5	2	353	3rd
2025	MotoGP	Aprilia Racing	Aprilia RS-GP	(Italy) Lorenzo Savadori	13	0	0	0	0	8	24th
2026	MotoGP	Aprilia Racing	Aprilia RS-GP	(Spain) Jorge Martin	3	0	2	0	0	77*	2nd*
2026	MotoGP	Aprilia Racing	Aprilia RS-GP	(Italy) Marco Bezzecchi	3	3	3	1	1	81*	1st*

==== By season ====
(key) (Races in bold indicate pole position; races in italics indicate fastest lap)

Year	Motorcycle	Tyres	Riders	1	2	3	4	5	6	7	8	9	10	11	12	13	14	15	16	17	18	19	20	21	22	Points	RC	Points	TC	Points	MC
2022	Aprilia RS-GP	M		QAT	INA	ARG	AME	POR	SPA	FRA	ITA	CAT	GER	NED	GBR	AUT	RSM	ARA	JPN	THA	AUS	MAL	VAL								
2022	Aprilia RS-GP	M	(Spain) Aleix Espargaró	4	9	**1**	11	3	3	3	3	**5**	4	4	9	6	6	3	16	11	9	10	Ret			212	4th	334	3rd	248	3rd
2022	Aprilia RS-GP	M	(Spain) Maverick Viñales	12	16	7	10	10	14	10	12	7	Ret	3	2	13	3	13	7	7	17	16	Ret			122	11th	334	3rd	248	3rd
2022	Aprilia RS-GP	M	(Italy) Lorenzo Savadori					Ret	21		22			20		19										0	NC	—N/a		248	3rd
2023	Aprilia RS-GP	M		POR	ARG	AME	SPA	FRA	ITA	GER	NED	GBR	AUT	CAT	RSM	IND	JPN	INA	AUS	THA	MAL	QAT	VAL								
2023	Aprilia RS-GP	M	(Spain) Maverick Viñales	2^{5}	12^{7}	4	Ret^{7}	Ret^{9}	12	Ret	Ret^{7}	5^{3}	6^{8}	2^{3}	5^{6}	8^{8}	19^{9}	2^{4}	11	Ret	11	4^{6}	**10**^{4}			204	7th	410	5th	326	3rd
2023	Aprilia RS-GP	M	(Spain) Aleix Espargaró	9^{6}	15	Ret^{4}	**5**	5^{8}	6^{8}	16^{9}	3^{4}	1^{5}	9^{7}	1^{1}	12^{8}	Ret	5	10	8	8^{5}	Ret	Ret	8			206	6th	410	5th	326	3rd
2023	Aprilia RS-GP	M	(Italy) Lorenzo Savadori						18		11		19													5 (12)	24th	—N/a		326	3rd
2024	Aprilia RS-GP	M		QAT	POR	AME	SPA	FRA	CAT	ITA	NED	GER	GBR	AUT	ARA	RSM	EMI	INA	JPN	AUS	THA	MAL	SLD								
2024	Aprilia RS-GP	M	(Spain) Maverick Viñales	10^{9}	Ret^{1}	**1**^{1}	9	5^{3}	12^{8}	8^{5}	5^{3}	12^{7}	13^{8}	7	Ret	16	6	6^{7}	Ret^{9}	8	7	7	15			189	7th	335	4th	285	3rd
2024	Aprilia RS-GP	M	(Spain) Aleix Espargaró	8^{3}	8^{8}	7^{5}	Ret	9^{5}	**4**^{1}	11^{9}	DNS	WD	**6**^{3}	9^{3}	10	Ret	8	Ret	9	16^{8}	9	13	5^{4}			134	11th	335	4th	285	3rd
2024	Aprilia RS-GP	M	(Italy) Lorenzo Savadori				Ret			21	DNS			20												0 (0)	28th	—N/a		285	3rd
2025	Aprilia RS-GP	M		THA	ARG	AME	QAT	SPA	FRA	GBR	ARA	ITA	NED	GER	CZE	AUT	HUN	CAT	RSM	JPN	INA	AUS	MAL	POR	VAL						
2025	Aprilia RS-GP	M	(Spain) Jorge Martin				Ret								7	Ret	4^{9}	10	13^{8}	DNS					Ret	34	21st	395	5th	418	2nd
2025	Aprilia RS-GP	M	(Italy) Marco Bezzecchi	6	Ret^{6}	6	9^{9}	14^{8}	14	1^{4}	8^{8}	5^{6}	2^{3}	Ret^{2}	2^{4}	**3**^{4}	3^{7}	Ret	**2**^{1}	4	**Ret**^{1}	3^{1}	11^{6}	**1**^{3}	**1**^{5}	353	3rd	395	5th	418	2nd
2025	Aprilia RS-GP	M	(Italy) Lorenzo Savadori	20	DNS	15		18	9	18	17	17	Ret	Ret				Ret				16	16	16		8	24th	395	5th	418	2nd
2026	Aprilia RS-GP	M		THA	BRA	USA	SPA	FRA	CAT	ITA	HUN	CZE	NED	GER	GBR	ARA	RSM	AUT	JPN	INA	AUS	MAL	QAT	POR	VAL						
2026	Aprilia RS-GP	M	(Spain) Jorge Martin	4^{5}	2^{3}	2^{1}																				77*	2nd*	101*	1st*	158*	1st*
2026	Aprilia RS-GP	M	(Italy) Marco Bezzecchi	**1**	**1**^{4 F}	1																				81*	1st*	101*	1st*	158*	1st*

== Models ==
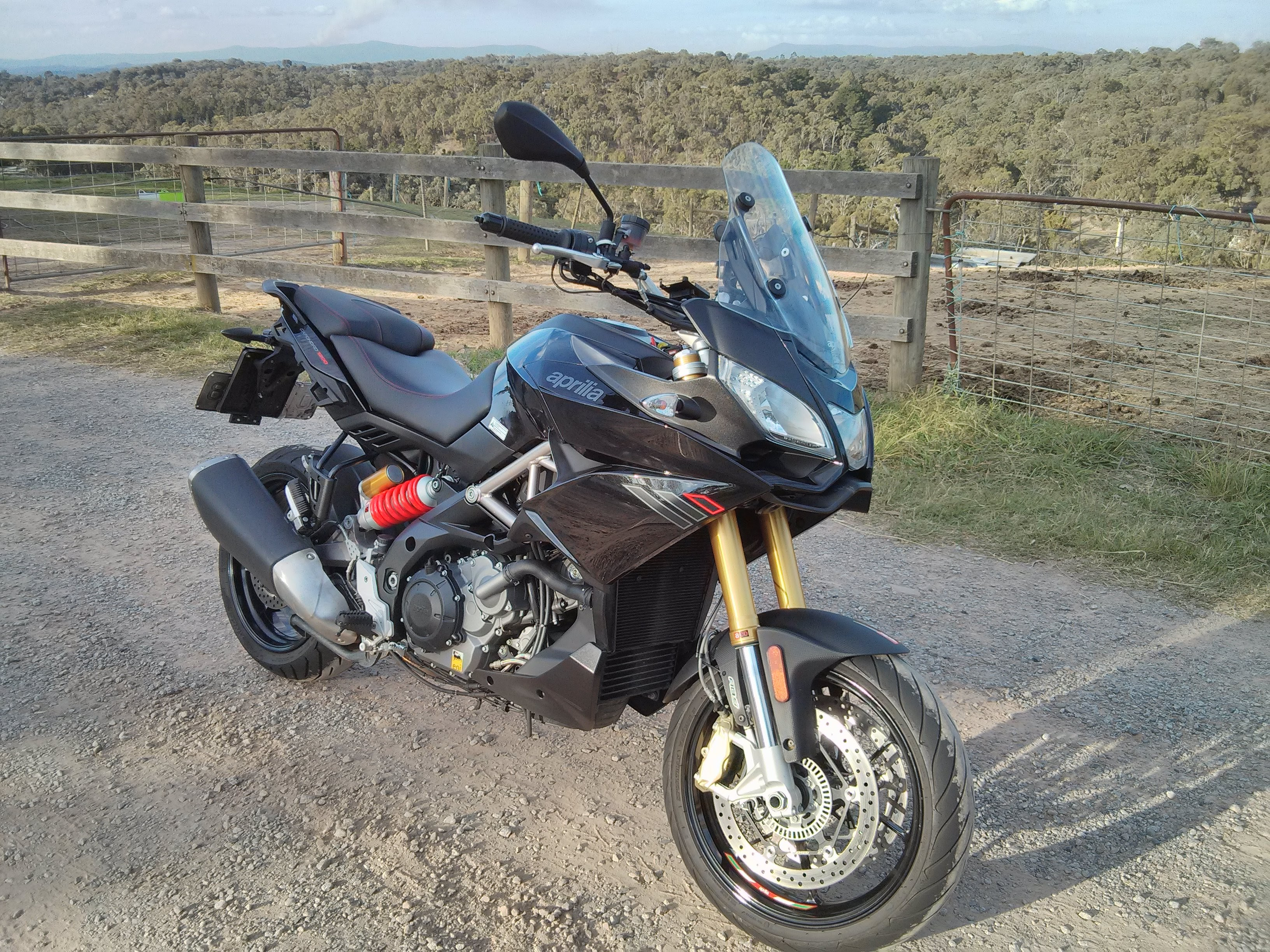
Aprilia Caponord 1200

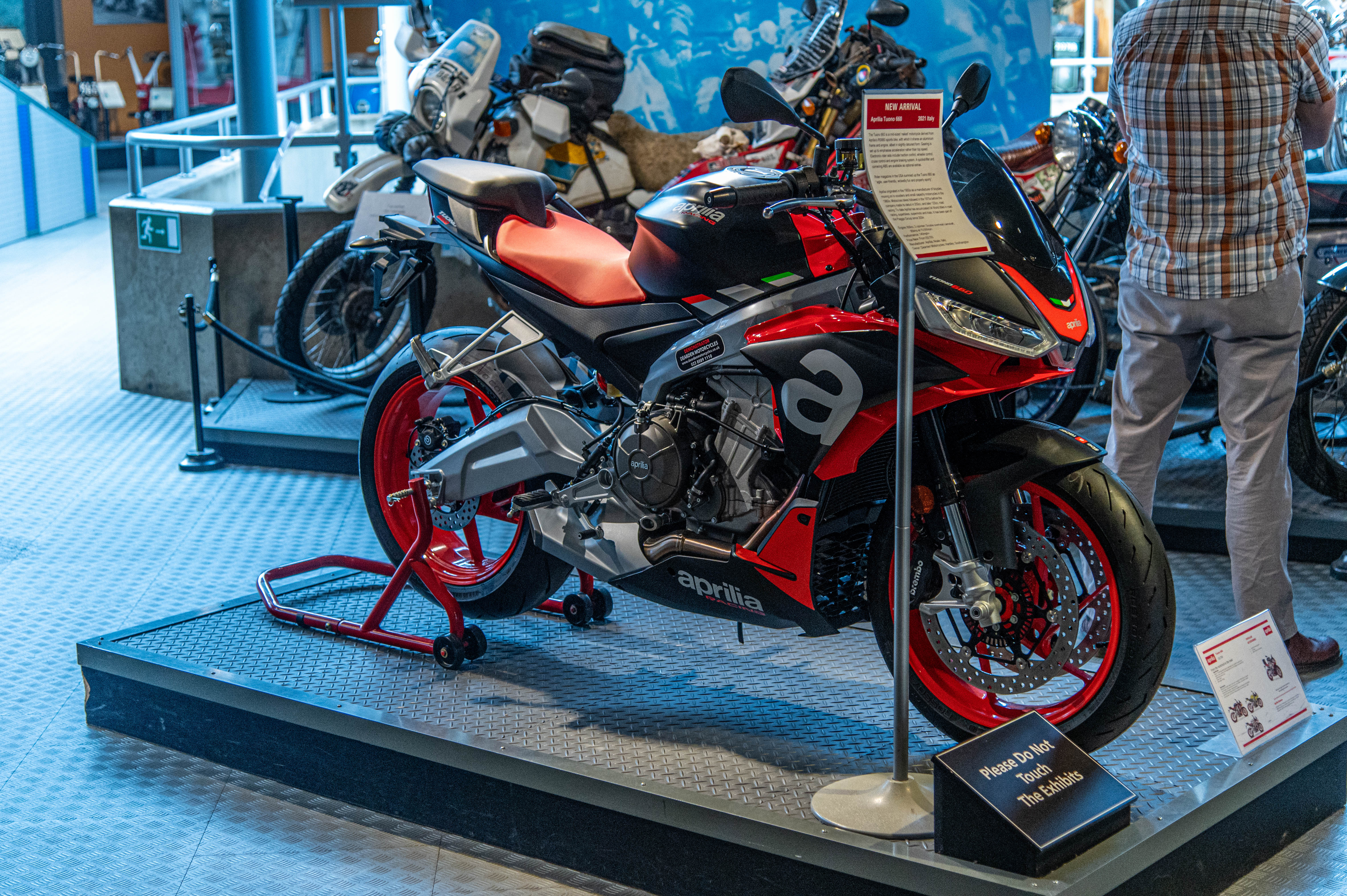
Aprilia Tuono 660

Racing motorcycles

- AF1 250
- RS125R
- RSV 250
- RSW-2 500
- RS Cube
- RSV4 R
  - Limited Edition 2019: RSV4 X
  - Limited Edition 2022: RSV4 X Trenta
  - Limited Edition 2024: RSV4 X Extrema
  - Limited Edition 2025: RSV4 X-GP
  - Limited Edition 2026: RSV4 X 250TH
- RS-GP

Road

- AF1 50
- AF1 125
- RST1000 Futura
- RSV Mille
- RSVR1000R
- RSV4 Factory
- RSV4 R
- RSV4 RR
- Tuono 125
- Tuono 457
- Tuono 660
- Tuono 1000R
- Tuono V4 R
  - Limited Edition 2020: Tuono V4 X
- RS4 50
- RS4 125
- RS 50
- RS 125
- RS 250
- RS 457
- RS 660
- Dorsoduro 1200
- Dorsoduro 900
- Dorsoduro 750
- SL1000
- Shiver 900
- Shiver 750
- Mana 850 GT
- STX 125
- Motó

Dual-sport

- ETX 125
- ETX 350
- ETX 600
- ETV 1000
- Caponord 1200
- Pegaso 50
- Pegaso 125
- Pegaso 600
- Pegaso 650
- Tuareg 50 rally
- Tuareg 125 rally
- Tuareg 250 rally
- Tuareg 50
- Tuareg 125
- Tuareg 350
- Tuareg 600
- Tuareg 660

Off-road

- SXV 450
- SXV 550
- RXV 450
- RXV 550
- MXV 450
- MX 50
- MX 125
- SX 50
- SX 125
- RX 50
- RX 125
- RX 250

Scooters

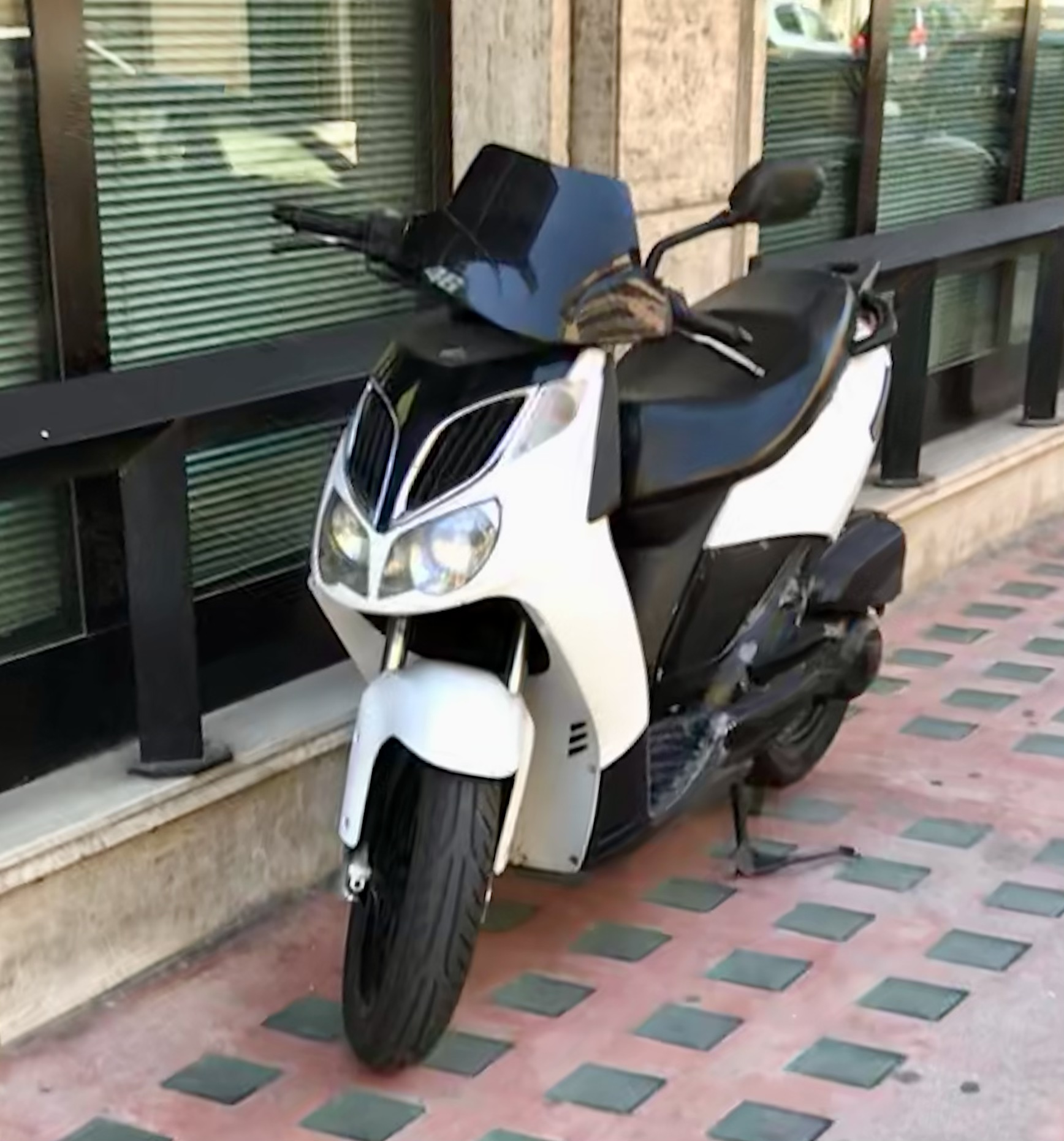
Aprilia Sportcity

- Amico
- Area 51
- Atlantic 125/200/250/300/400/500
- Leonardo 125/150/250/300
- Mojito 50/125/150
- SR 50
- SR Max
- SR GT
- SR Motard
- SRV 850
- SXR
- Storm
- Scarabeo 50/100/125/200
- Sportcity

== See also ==
- Gilera – motorcycles made by Piaggio
- Vespa – scooters made by Piaggio
- List of Italian companies
