= Aprilia RSV Mille =

Sport motorcycle manufactured by Aprilla

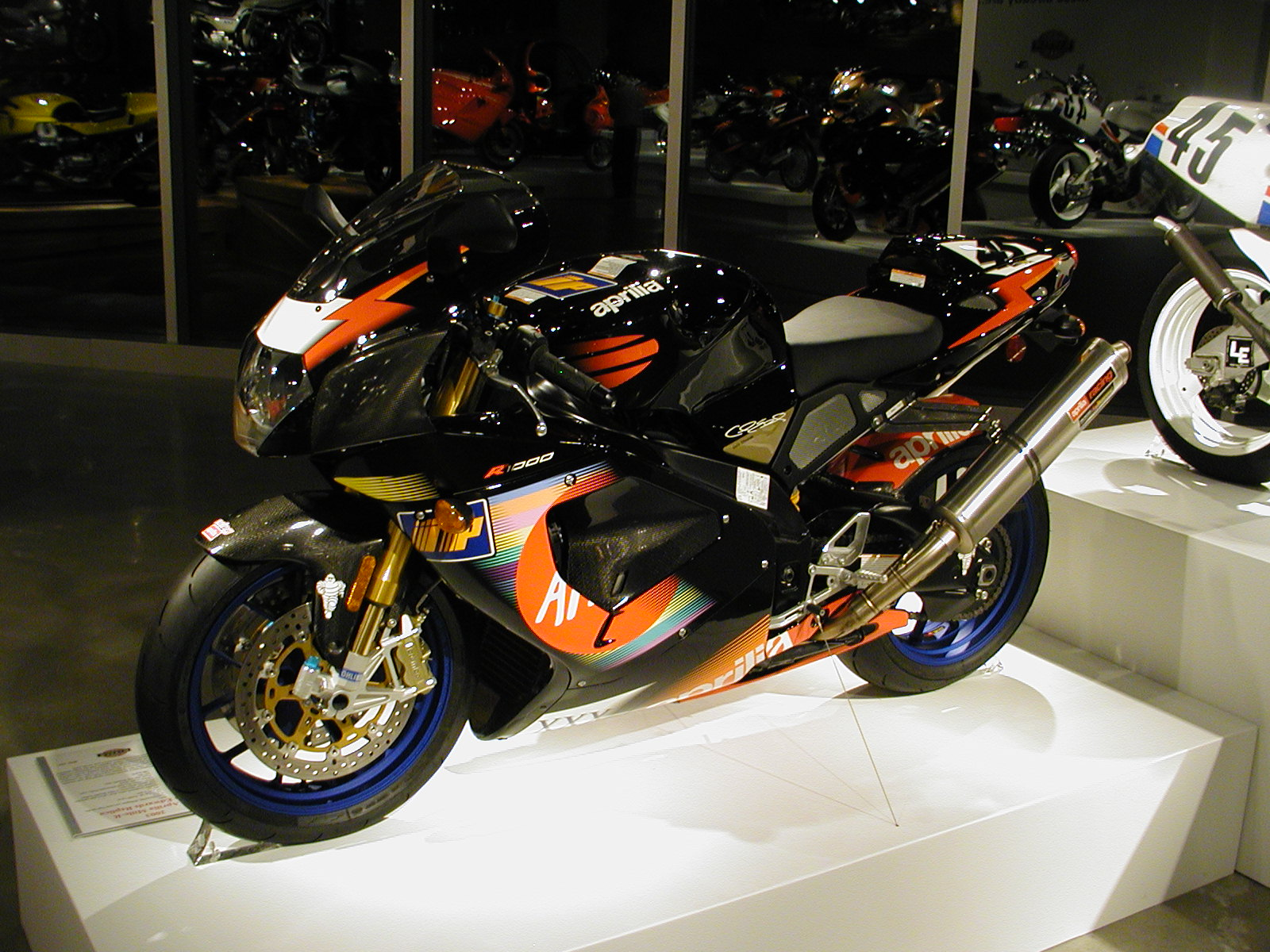
- 2003 Aprilia Mille-R
- Manufacturer: Aprilia
- Production: 1998-2003
- Successor: Aprilia RSV 1000 R
- Class: Super bike
- Engine: 998 cc, 60 degree transverse V-twin, two-cylinder, 4 stroke, liquid-cooled, DOHC, 8-valve
- Bore / stroke: 97.0 mm × 67.5 mm (3.82 in × 2.66 in)
- Compression ratio: 11.4:1 98-00 11.8:1 01-03
- Top speed: 178 mph (286 km/h)
- Power: 128 hp (95 kW)
- Torque: 76 lb⋅ft (103 N⋅m)
- Ignition type: Computer Controlled Digital Electronic
- Transmission: 6-speed, chain drive, slipper clutch on some models
- Suspension: Front: upside down telescopic adjustable forks with spring preload, rebound and compression damping (Showa standard, Öhlins R&T forks on R model); Rear:oscillating rear fork in light alloy with differentiated profile arms and hydropneumatic adjustable mono-shock absorber (Sachs standard, Öhlins shock on R model)
- Brakes: Front: double floating 320 mm discs with 4-piston Brembo gold caliper Rear: Single 220 mm disc with dual pin Brembo gold caliper
- Tires: 120/70ZR17, 190/55ZR17
- Wheelbase: 1,415 mm (55.7 in)
- Dimensions: L: 2,070 mm (81 in); W: 725 mm (28.5 in)
- Seat height: 825 mm (32.5 in)
- Weight: 463 lb (210 kg) (wet)
- Fuel capacity: 21 L (4.6 imp gal; 5.5 US gal)

The Aprilia RSV Mille is a sport motorcycle manufactured by Aprilia from 1998 to 2003. It was offered in three versions, RSV Mille, RSV Mille R, and RSV Mille SP.

The first RSV Mille (ME) was made from 1998 to 2000, the updated RSV Mille (RP) from 2001 to 2002 and the last update was made in 2003.

With a 998 cc 60-degree V-twin engine built by the Austrian company Rotax, the RSV Mille was the first large displacement motorcycle made by Aprilia that up to then had made up to 250cc engines. This same engine was used unmodified in the Tuono and in slightly modified form in the SL1000 Falco.

The Mille featured a type of slipper clutch, which worked by using a vacuum on a closed throttle from the inlet manifold to give the effect of slipper clutch, but only on a closed throttle.

== Model History ==
The first changes were made in 2001 when the fairing was restyled, adding wind deflectors to improve airflow. The fuel tank was changed to a plastic item (with a reduction in capacity), and the rear shock on both the standard and the 'R' models was revised.

In 2002, the front brake calipers were changed to Brembo Monobloc 4 pad calipers - each piston having a separate pad gave an increase in braking performance and feel.

In 2003, the gear ratios were changed to give a slightly closer ratio gearbox, the exhaust system was changed and the tail piece and front mudguard were redesigned.

From 2004, the Mille was replaced by the RSV-R and RSV-R Factory.

== RSV Mille R ==
The RSV Mille R is a lighter, higher spec. version of the standard Mille, introduced in 1999. It features Öhlins suspension, an Öhlins steering damper, forged aluminum wheels, carbon fibre front mudguard and a shorter subframe for one person use only (no passenger seat).

== RSV Mille SP ==
The SP stands for Sport Production and this version was made as a homologation special for the Superbike World Championship. Only 150 motorcycles, the minimum requirement to homologate the model for Superbike World Championship, were manufactured in 1999. It uses a special 996 cc short-stroke version of the 60-degree V-twin engine, developed in collaboration with Cosworth.

== Replicas ==
In 2002, Aprilia produced 300 limited edition RSV Mille R Haga Replica. The motorcycle has the same livery as the bike used by Noriyuki Haga at the Superbike World Championship and came with a circuit kit, which included a full Akrapovic titanium exhaust system and an Eprom injection unit.

In 2003, an RSV Mille R Edwards Replica with a livery inspired by the Aprilia RS Cube MotoGP motorcycle ridden by Colin Edwards. as with the Haga replica, the motorcycle came with a circuit kit, which included Akrapovic exhausts, a more pressurised airbox, an Eprom injection unit and 57 mm (instead of 51 mm) throttle bodies.
