= Aprilia SL750 Shiver =

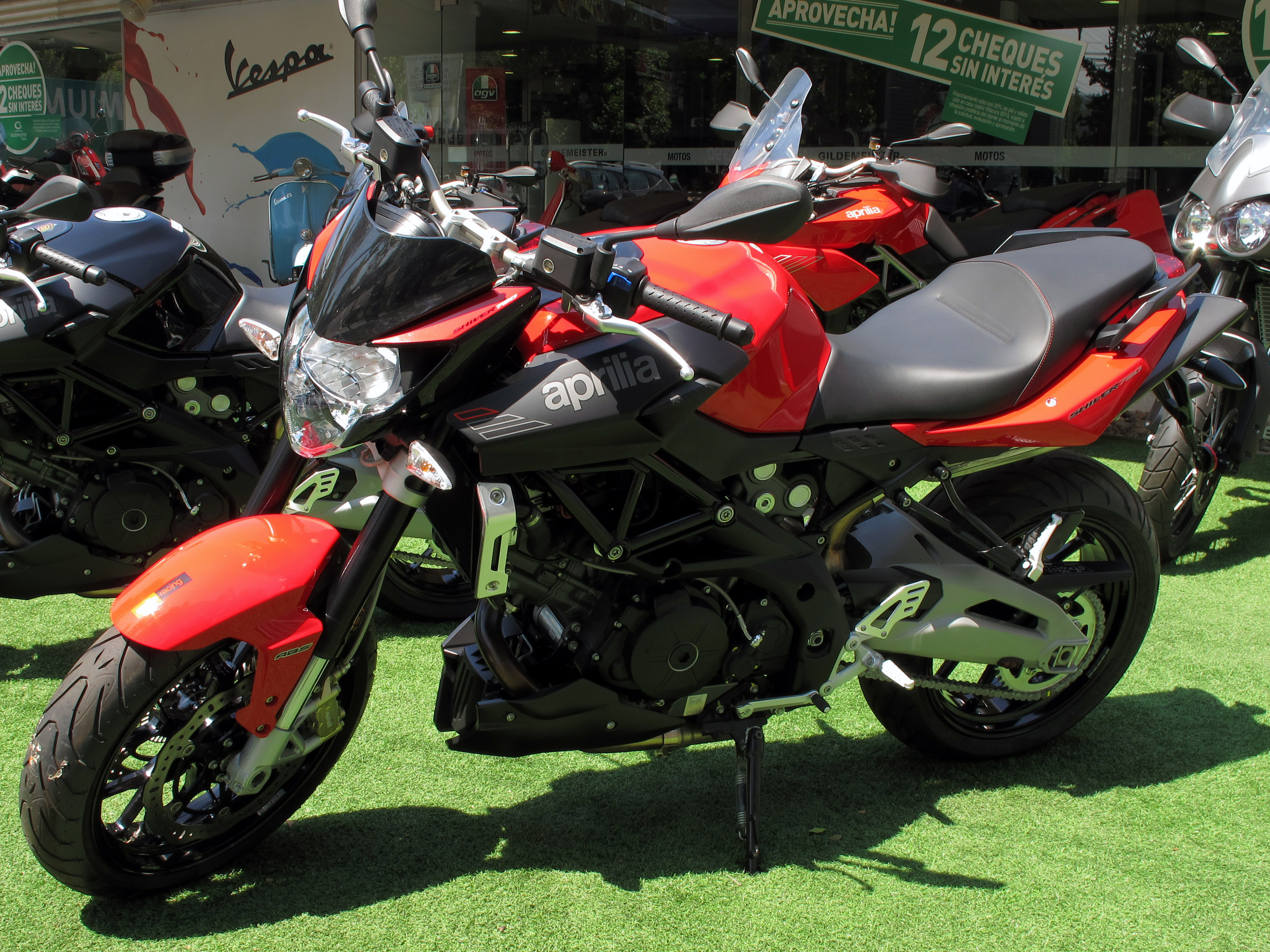
- Manufacturer: Aprilia
- Production: 2007–2016
- Successor: Aprilia Shiver 900
- Class: Naked bike
- Engine: 749.9 cc (45.76 cu in) liquid-cooled 90° V-twin
- Bore / stroke: 92.0 mm × 56.4 mm (3.62 in × 2.22 in)
- Compression ratio: 11.0:1
- Power: 94 hp (70 kW) @ 9,000 rpm 77 hp (57 kW) (rear wheel)
- Torque: 60 lb⋅ft (81 N⋅m) @ 8,500 rpm
- Transmission: 6-speed, chain drive
- Suspension: Front: 43 mm inverted fork Rear: Hydraulic monoshock, adjustable preload and rebound
- Brakes: Front: Dual discs Rear: Single disc
- Tires: Front: 120/70 ZR17; Rear: 180/55 ZR17
- Wheelbase: 1,440 mm (57 in)
- Dimensions: L: 2,265 mm (89.2 in); W: 800 mm (31 in); H: 1,135 mm (44.7 in)
- Seat height: 810 mm (32 in)
- Weight: 189 kg (417 lb) (dry); 222 kg (489 lb) (wet)
- Fuel capacity: 16 L (4.2 US gal)

The Aprilia Shiver 750 is a naked motorcycle manufactured by Italian manufacturer Aprilia. The motorcycle incorporates the first Ride by Wire Technology on a production motorcycle and a 90° V-twin engine.

The Shiver is also available as a partially faired option known as the Shiver 750 GT, which was launched in 2009. The instrument panel features comprehensive gauges including a gear indicator. The 'Ride by Wire' electronic throttle has three available power settings, referred to as Sport, Touring and Rain. Sport mode is normal, with maximum power and torque; Touring mode scales back the responsiveness; Rain mode reduces torque by 25%.
