= Aprilia RSV 1000 R =

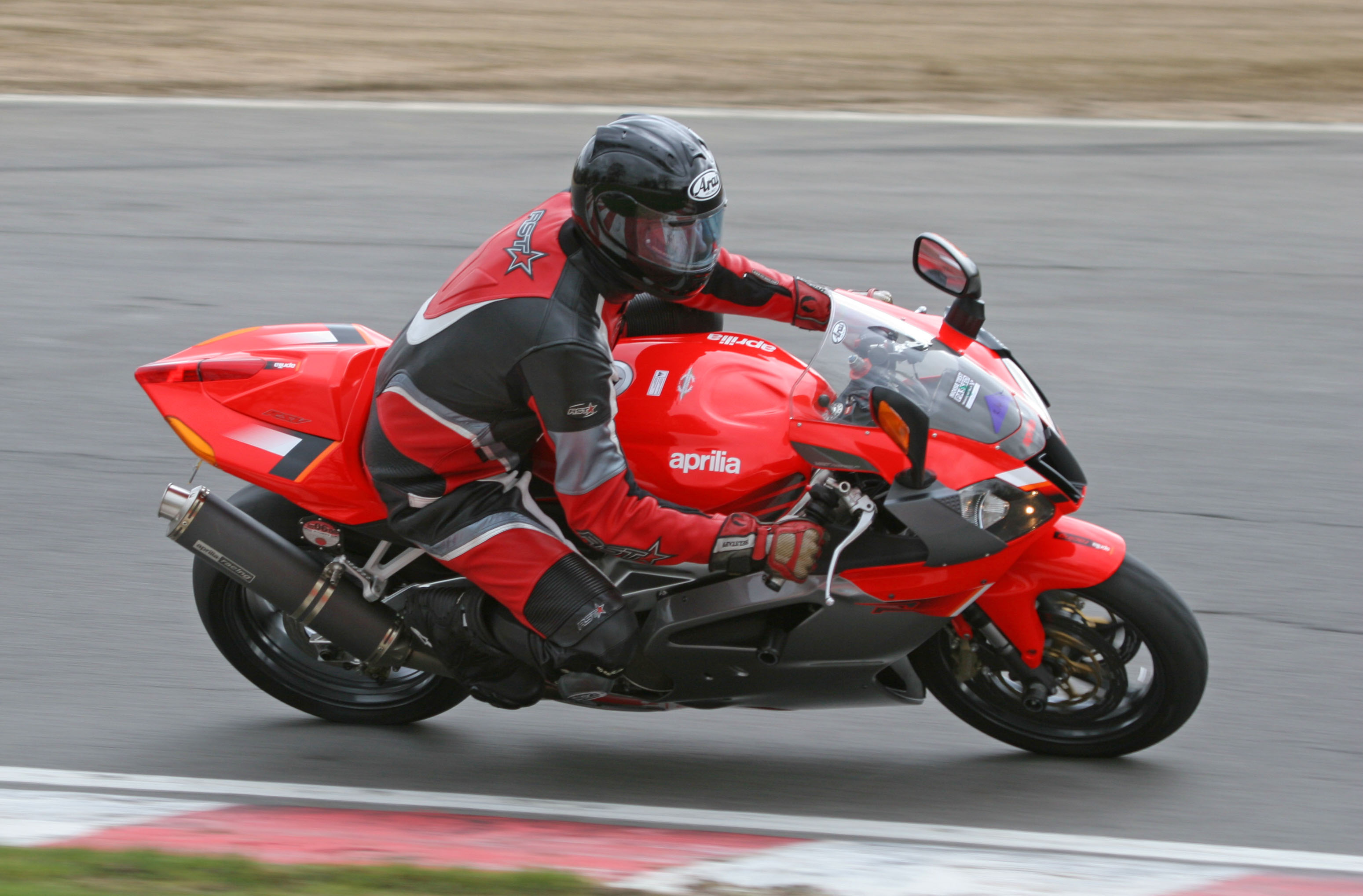
- 2004 Aprilia RSV 1000 R
- Manufacturer: Aprilia
- Also called: RSVR, RSV2
- Production: 2004–2010
- Predecessor: Aprilia RSV Mille
- Successor: Aprilia RSV4
- Class: Sports bike
- Engine: 997.6 cc (60.88 cu in) liquid-cooled 60° V-twin
- Bore / stroke: 97.0 mm × 67.5 mm (3.82 in × 2.66 in)
- Power: 139 hp (104 kW) (claimed); 113.9 hp (84.9 kW) (rear wheel)
- Torque: 79 lb⋅ft (107 N⋅m) (rear wheel)
- Transmission: 6-speed, chain drive
- Suspension: Front: 43 mm Öhlins titanium nitride (TiN) coated inverted fork, adjustable preload, compression and rebound, 120 mm (4.7 in) travel Rear: Sachs monoshock with APS linkage, adjustable preload, compression, rebound and length, 133 mm (5.2 in) travel
- Brakes: Front: Dual 320 mm (13 in) discs, Brembo 4-piston radial calipers Rear: Single disc
- Tires: Front: 120/70 ZR 17; Rear: 190/50 ZR 17
- Wheelbase: 1,415 mm (55.7 in)
- Dimensions: L: 2,035 mm (80.1 in); W: 730 mm (29 in); H: 1,130 mm (44 in)
- Seat height: 810 mm (32 in)
- Weight: 185 kg (408 lb) (dry); 214 kg (472 lb) (wet)
- Fuel capacity: 18 L (4.0 imp gal; 4.8 US gal) (including 4 L (0.88 imp gal; 1.1 US gal) reserve)

The Aprilia RSV 1000 R is a sport bike motorcycle made by Italian company Aprilia from 2004 through 2010. Along with the bike's redesign Aprilia renamed the RSV from RSV Mille to RSV 1000 R. It is offered in three versions: RSV 1000 R (while the "R" designation on the RSV Mille signified the higher spec version) is the standard version, the higher spec version is the RSV 1000 R Factory, and Aprilia made a limited-edition version called RSV 1000 R Nera.

== RSV 1000 R Factory ==
The RSV 1000 R Factory comes with fully adjustable Öhlins Racing rear monoshock and adjustable Öhlins steering damper, blue anodized forged aluminium wheels, frame finished in black or gold, and carbon fibre parts.

For 2006 the RSV 1000 R Factory won the Maxisport category for Masterbike 2006 and overall Masterbike of the year.

== RSV 1000 R Nera ==
The RSV 1000 R Nera comes with carbon fibre body panels, magnesium wheels, full titanium exhaust, titanium nuts, bolts and fasteners (reducing the motorcycle's weight to 175 kg). It is powered by an enhanced version of the 60° v-twin magnesium engine producing 104 kW (139 hp) @ 10,000 rpm. Only 200 RSV 1000 R Nera motorcycles were made.
