= Aprilia RXV/SXV =

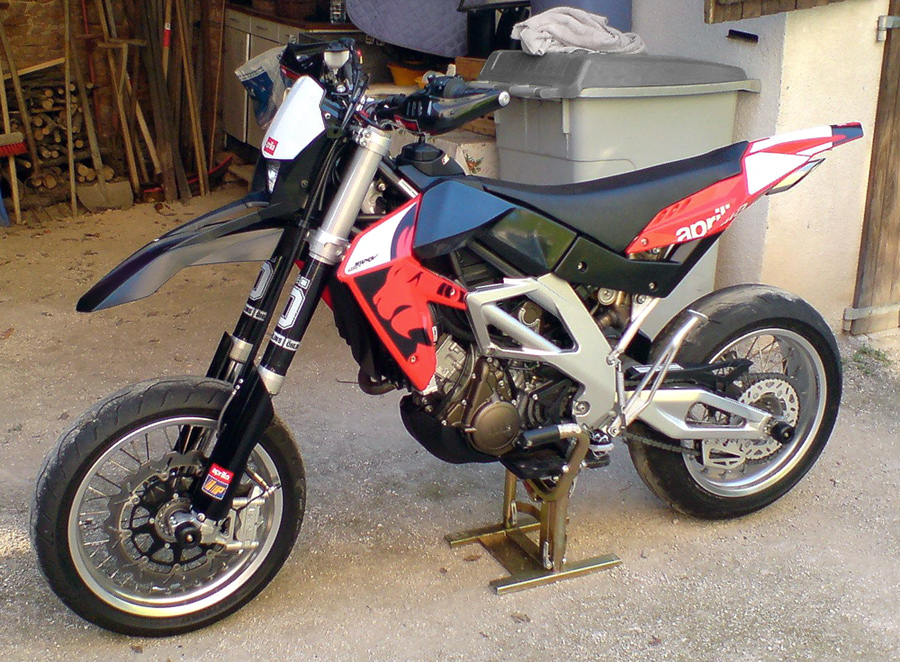
- Aprilia SXV 450
- Manufacturer: Aprilia
- Production: 2006–2014
- Class: Off road enduro (RXV); Dual sport supermoto (SXV)
- Engine: RXV/SXV 450: 449 cc twin-cylinder 77° v-twin dry sump water-cooled four-stroke with 12.5:1 compression ratio. RXV/SXV 550: 549 cc twin-cylinder 77° v-twin dry sump water-cooled four-stroke with 12:1 compression ratio.
- Power: RXV/SXV 450: 60 bhp claimed crank hp RXV/SXV 550: 70 bhp claimed crank hp SXV 450 measured, dynojet: 54.3 hp at 11000 rpm SXV 550, measured, dynojet: 68.9 hp at 10900 rpm
- Transmission: 5-speed manual with separate gearbox lubrication, final chain drive
- Suspension: Front: 48 mm upside down fork with two adjustments Rear: hydraulic monoshock with compression and rebound adjustment.
- Brakes: double oversize disc, wave rotors
- Tires: 120/70 x 17", 180/55 x 17"
- Wheelbase: 1,495 mm (58.9 in)
- Dimensions: L: 2,222 mm (87.5 in); W: 800 mm (31 in); H: 1,300.5 mm (51.20 in)
- Seat height: 918 mm (36.1 in)
- Weight: 142 kg (313 lb) (dry); NA (wet)
- Fuel capacity: 7.8 L (1.7 imp gal; 2.1 US gal); 12 L (2.6 imp gal; 3.2 US gal)

The Aprilia RXV/SXV series are four-stroke, v-twin off-road (RXV) or dual sport supermoto (SXV) motorcycles produced by Aprilia since 2006. Both versions have either 449 cc (27.4 cu in) or 549 cc (33.5 cu in) engine sizes.

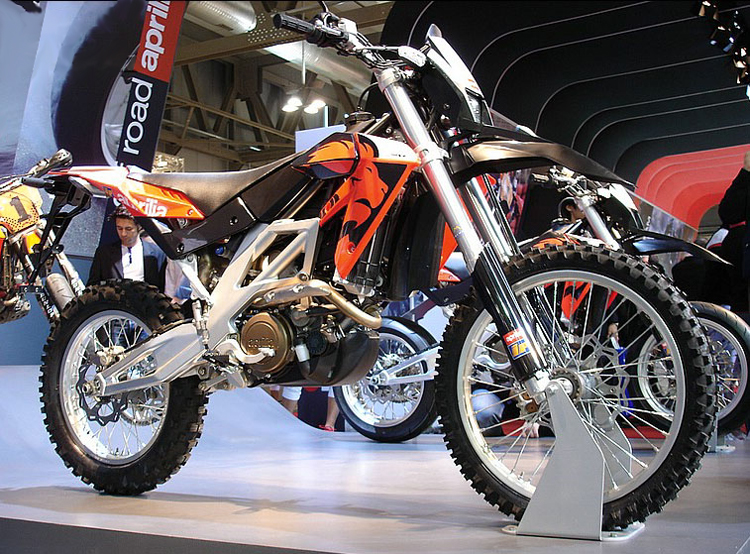
Aprilia RXV 450

== Frame/chassis ==
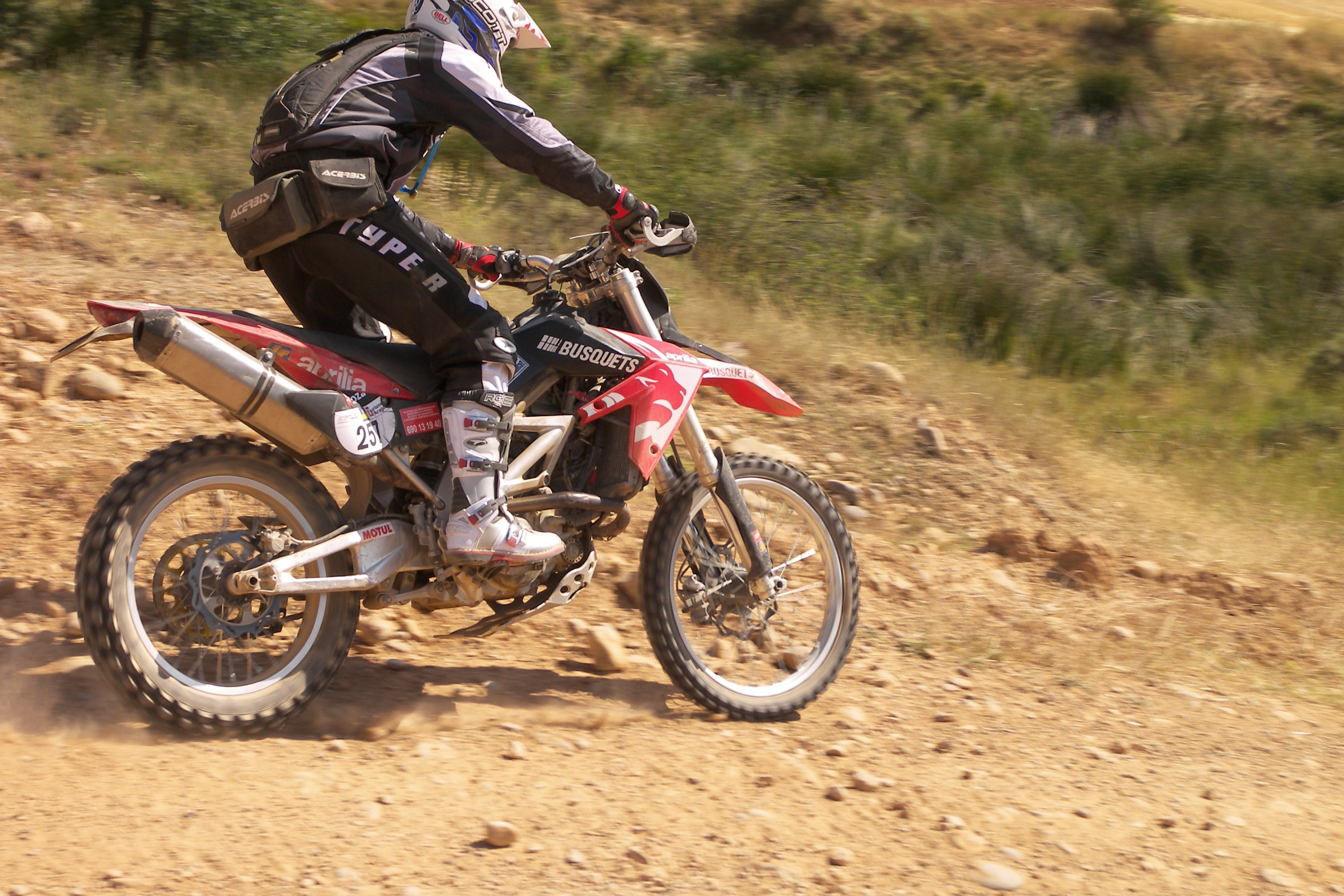
Aprilia RXV 450

The RXV/SXV's frame is made of a combination of tubular steel and aluminum plates. The compact engine fits into the frame in such a way that the air filter sits on top of the engine, below the gas tank, rather than the more traditional under-the-seat location. This allows for a lower distribution of weight.

== Engine ==
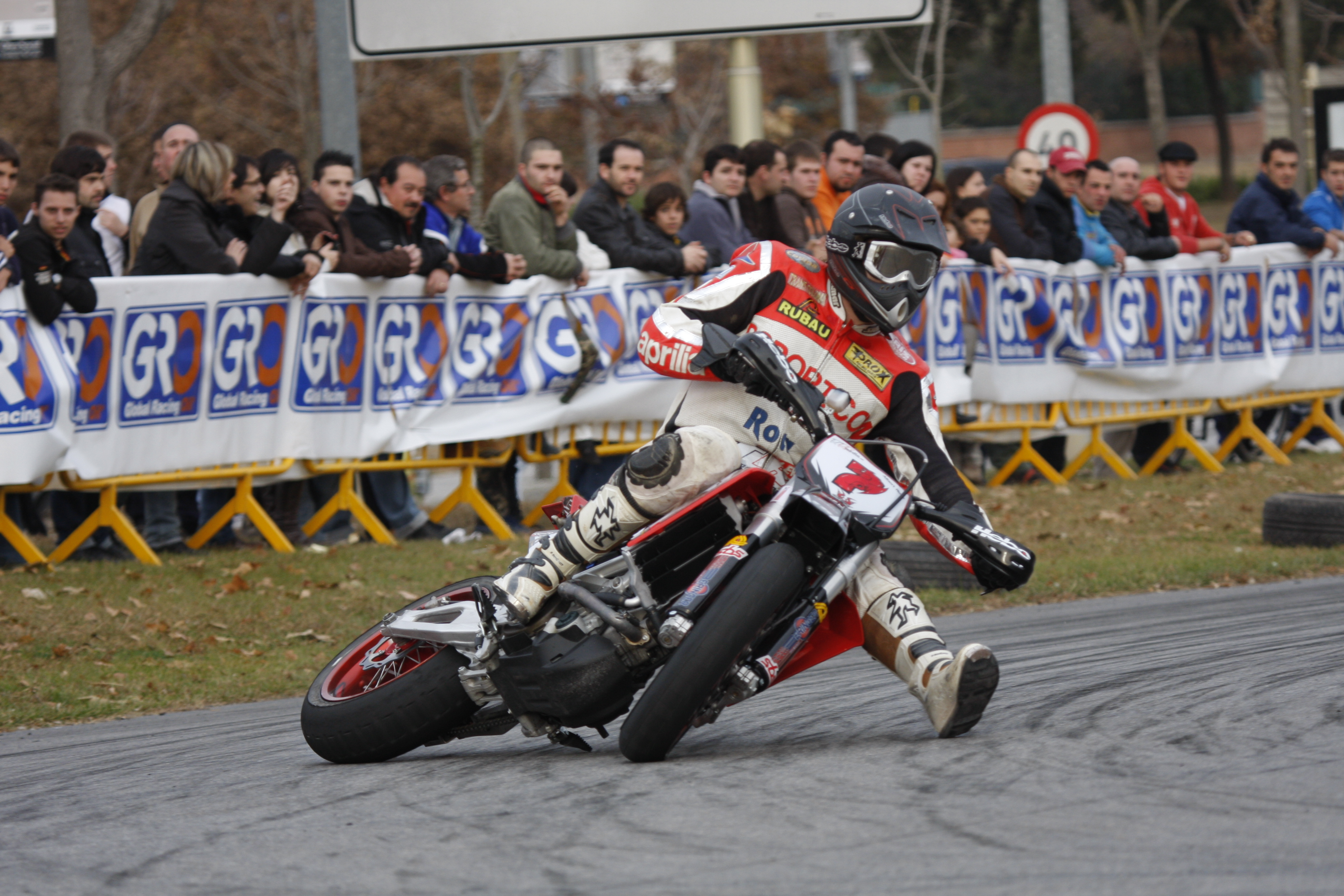
Aprilia SXV in a Supermoto competition

The RXV/SXV has a v-twin engine, and is one of the first off-road motorcycles to feature fuel injection. The 450 has a displacement of 449 cc, while the 550 has a displacement of 549 cc. Each engine has a single-overhead-cam and four valves per cylinder. The 77-degree cylinder angle minimizes vibration. Both are dry sump, with a separate oil tank for the gearbox and engine.

The 450 produces a claimed 60 horsepower (45 kW) at the crank, while the 550 produces a claimed 70.
