= Aprilia AF1 250 =

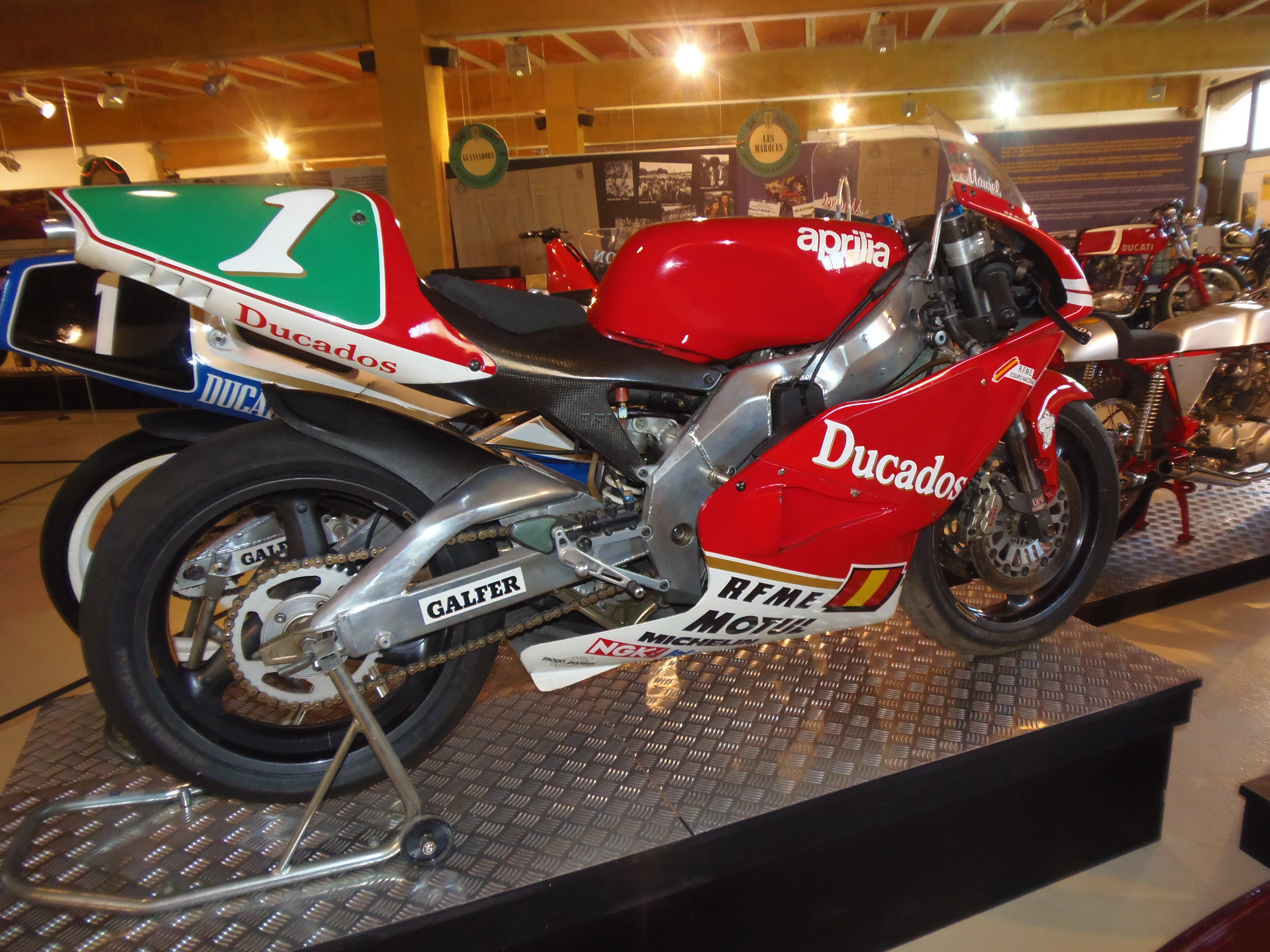
- Manufacturer: Aprilia
- Production: 1985–1990
- Successor: Aprilia RSV 250
- Class: 250cc
- Engine: 249.2 cc (15.21 cu in) Rotax 256 two-stroke liquid-cooled tandem-twin
- Bore / stroke: 54 mm × 54.4 mm (2.13 in × 2.14 in)
- Power: 80 hp (60 kW) @ 12,500 rpm
- Transmission: 6-speed, chain final drive
- Suspension: Upside-down telescopic fork (front) mono-shock (rear)
- Brakes: Disc brakes
- Wheelbase: 1,280–1,370 mm (50–54 in)
- Dimensions: L: 1,910–2,040 mm (75–80 in); W: 615–680 mm (24.2–26.8 in); H: 1,100–1,170 mm (43–46 in)
- Seat height: 780–805 mm (30.7–31.7 in)
- Weight: 90 kg (200 lb) (dry)
- Related: Aprilia AF1

The Aprilia AF1 250 is a racing motorcycle, designed, developed, and built by Aprilia for the 250cc class in Grand Prix motorcycle racing, between 1985 and 1990. Loris Reggiani famously won the 1987 San Marino Grand Prix with this bike.

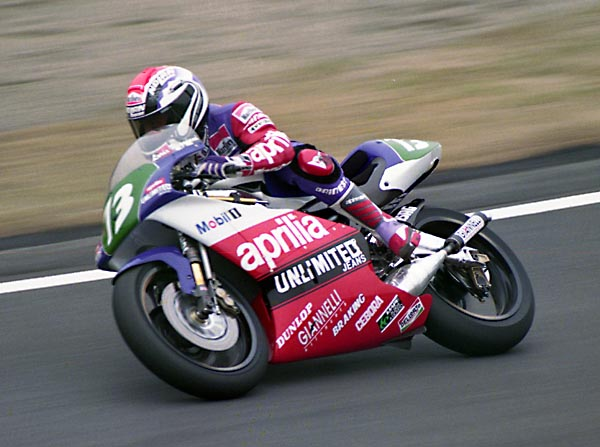
Aprilia AF1 250
