= Breguet-Bugatti 32A =

Also referred to as "Quadimoteur Type A" or "Bréguet-Bugatti 32A Quadimoteur Type A" The Bréguet-Bugatti 32A was a large French aircraft engine developed in the early 1920s by Société des Ateliers d'Aviation Louis Bréguet (Bréguet) under licence from designs by Ettore Bugatti. The engine employed a compound arrangement, coupling two U-16 engine blocks in tandem to drive a single propeller shaft. [R] [R] It was intended for installation in large transport and bomber aircraft such as the Bréguet 20 Leviathan family.

== Design and development ==
The 32A originated from the Bugatti U-16 aircraft engine, which featured two inline eight-cylinder banks mounted side by side on a common crankcase and geared to a single propeller shaft. Bréguet acquired the manufacturing licence after the First World War and made several structural and mechanical refinements.

Bréguet's first licensed U-16 engines had a 4.25 in (108 mm) bore and 6.30 in (160 mm) stroke, with a total displacement of 1,431 cu in (23.5 L), producing about 480 hp (358 kW) at 2,150 rpm. This design later evolved into the U.24 variant, which retained the same bore but increased the stroke to 6.42 in (163 mm), raising displacement to 1,458 cu in (23.9 L) and power to roughly 600 hp (447 kW) at 2,800 rpm.

A major innovation in the U.24 was the introduction of freewheeling clutch mechanisms between the crankshafts and the propeller shaft. In the earlier U-16, a failure in one eight-cylinder section would stop the entire engine, as both crankshafts were rigidly linked. The new clutches allowed one bank to disengage automatically if it failed, letting the remaining section continue to power the propeller. Although both halves still shared a common oil system, this improvement greatly enhanced safety and reliability.

Building upon the U.24, Bréguet designed the Bréguet-Bugatti 32A as a "quad-engine" concept: two U.24 units coupled nose-to-nose via a central gearbox driving a single output shaft through the forward unit. Each half engine could be started and run independently. The configuration created a 32-cylinder assembly with a displacement of 2,969 cu in (48.7 L), weighing about 2,480 lb (1,125 kg). Output was rated at approximately 850 hp (634 kW) at 2,000 rpm.

Although mechanically advanced, the design was extremely complex and required precise synchronisation between both power sections. The rear engine's propeller shaft ran through the V of the forward block, connecting to the reduction gearbox and propeller at the front. Bréguet's engineers also experimented with an improved version—the Bréguet-Bugatti 32B—but only one or two examples of the 32A are believed to have been completed.

== Operational history ==
The 32A engine was installed in the Bréguet 20 Leviathan, a twin-boom experimental aircraft intended for the 1922 Grand Prix des Avions de Transport. Test pilot Robert Thiéry is reported to have made the aircraft's first flight on 20 June 1922. Despite generating considerable interest, the project did not proceed beyond the prototype stage, as the engine's weight and mechanical complexity proved impractical for regular operation. By 1924, Bréguet abandoned the tandem-engine approach in favour of more conventional twin-engine installations. The 32A thus remained an experimental powerplant, illustrating the engineering ambition—but also the limitations—of early 1920s compound-engine design.

== Technical description ==
- Configuration: Two 16-cylinder engine units coupled via a gearbox and driving a single propeller shaft.
- Output: One source lists an output of approximately 850 hp for the 32A.
- The precise values for bore, stroke, displacement, and weight vary among sources and are not reliably confirmed. One source cites a 4.33 in (110 mm) bore and 6.30 in (160 mm) stroke, displacement 2,969 cu in (48.7 L), and weight 2,482 lb (1,126 kg) for the 32A. Given the variance among sources, these figures should be treated with caution until further archival confirmation.

== Applications ==
- Bréguet 20 Leviathan — prototype transport aircraft built to test the 32A engine.

== Legacy ==
Although only experimental, the Bréguet-Bugatti 32A demonstrated Bréguet's pursuit of high-power solutions during the transitional period between the First and Second World Wars. Its innovative coupling system anticipated later multi-bank and compound aero-engine experiments, such as the Rolls-Royce Vulture and Napier Sabre, though none followed its exact tandem configuration. One surviving 32-series engine is preserved in the Musée de l'Air et de l'Espace in Le Bourget, France.
