= MTH R 422-CG =

Austrian aircraft engine

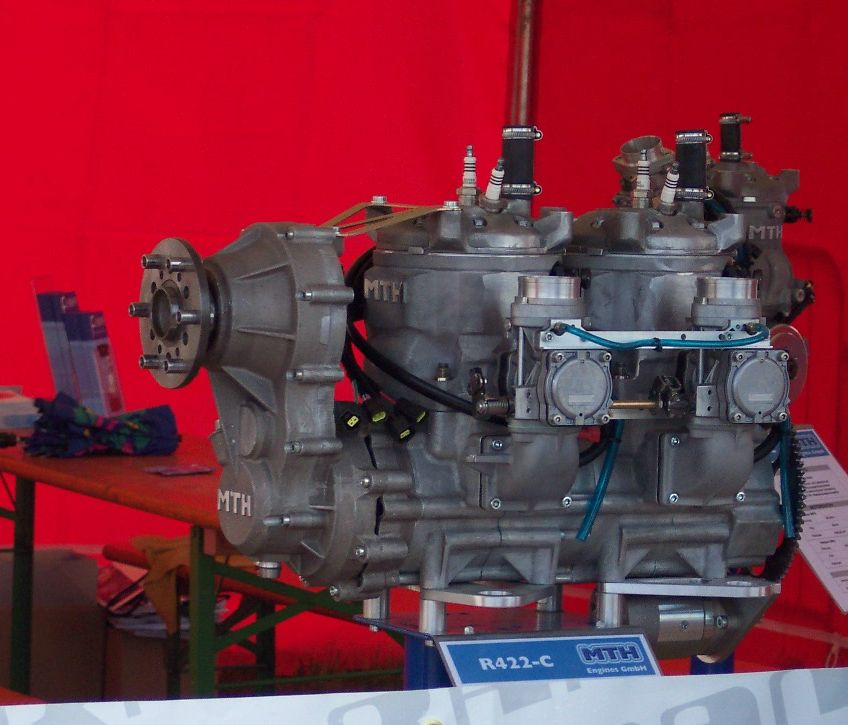
- Type: Aircraft engine
- National origin: Austria
- Manufacturer: MTH Engines

The MTH R 422-CG is an Austrian aircraft engine, designed and produced by MTH Engines of Mattsee for use in ultralight aircraft.

== Design and development ==
The engine is a twin-cylinder two-stroke, in-line, 1,339 cc (81.7 cu in) displacement, liquid-cooled, gasoline engine design, with a toothed mechanical gearbox reduction drive with a reduction ratio of 3.0:1. It employs dual electronic ignition systems and produces 105 hp (78 kW) at 6500 rpm, with a compression ratio of 12:1.

== Specifications (R 422-CG) ==
Data from Tacke

=== General characteristics ===
- Type: Twin cylinder, two stroke aircraft engine
- Bore: 99 mm (3.9 in)
- Stroke: 87 mm (3.4 in)
- Displacement: 1,339 cc (81.7 cu in)
- Dry weight: 42 kg (92.6 lb)

=== Components ===
- Fuel type: gasoline
- Cooling system: liquid
- Reduction gear: toothed mechanical gearbox

=== Performance ===
- Power output: 105 hp (78 kW)

== See also ==
Related lists

- List of aircraft engines
