= Undercut crankshaft =

Compact form of crankshaft for piston engines

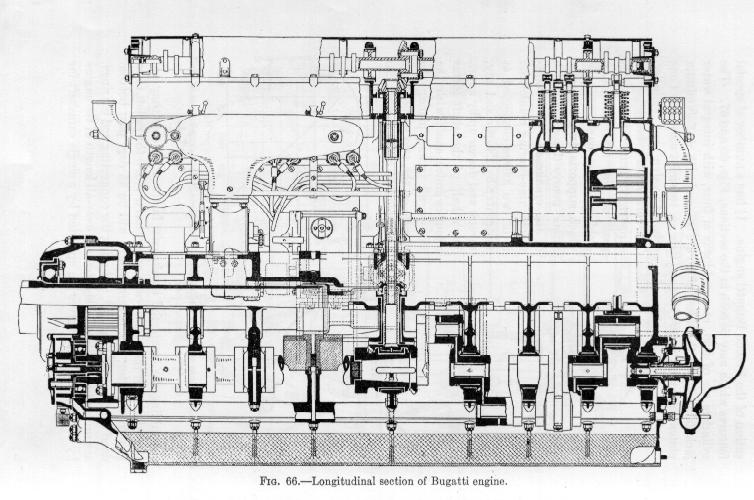
Bugatti U-16 engine

An undercut crankshaft is a form of crankshaft for piston engines, where the overall length of the crankshaft is shortened by overlapping the main bearings of the crankshaft with the big end bearings of the connecting rods.

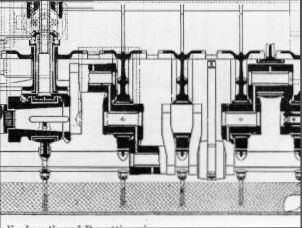
Crankshaft close-up Note the tight spacing of the connecting rod between the crankshaft webs in the 3rd cylinder from the left.

Although this seems impossible at first glance, the geometry of the engine does permit this overlap. The big-end bearings of connecting rods are wider (along the crank axis) than the thickness of the rod itself. By making the crank webs with an offset to them, it is possible to place the main bearings closer together, closely sandwiching the rod passing between them, where this is now a narrower gap than the bearing size. The main bearings are similarly confined and each main bearing can be supported by only a thin wall across the crankcase.

The difficulty with these engines is in their manufacture. The overall shape of the crankshaft and its webs is not a problem, but finishing the bearing surfaces by grinding is. There is no longer access for the large abrasive discs of a crankshaft grinder to reach each bearing, the offset crankshaft webs now being in the way. As a result, each bearing must be made and finish-ground individually; then assembled into a built-up crankshaft, usually by shrink-fitting.

One of the few engines to use undercut crankshafts was the Bugatti U-16 aircraft engine, a typical Bugatti approach, where only their unlimited budget and attention to detail could afford such complexities. The U-16 engine also had each 8-cylinder crankshaft built as two 4-cylinder crankshafts, assembled by a bolted taper joint. This joint may be seen at the left-hand side of the close-up drawing.

The French Ariès narrow-angle V4 of 1907 had a built-up crankshaft with disc webs. The journals were held into the webs by nuts on their ends, the nuts protruding past the webs and having the effect of an undercut crank.

The Chaise, also French, 100 hp engine of 1930 used a built-up crankshaft with a 'quincunx' (staggered) cylinder layout to give a short, compact engine.

== See also ==
- Tunnel crankshaft, another crankshaft design that makes engines shorter overall by combining the crank web and main bearing
