= Crankcase (disambiguation) =

A crankcase is the housing for the crankshaft of an engine.

Crankcase can also mean:

- Crankcase (G.I. Joe), a fictional character in the G.I. Joe universe
- Crankcase (Transformers), a fictional character in the Transformers universe
