= Inline engine =

Inline engine may refer to:

- a straight engine, generally
- Inline engine (aeronautics)
