= Tunnel crankcase =

Design feature of a piston engine

A tunnel crankcase, tunnel crankshaft or disc-webbed crankshaft is a design feature of a piston engine where the main bearings that support the crankshaft within the crankcase form the largest diameter of any part of the crankshaft and are larger than the crank webs. This requires a crankcase with a large tunnel instead of cross web supports for narrower main bearings, hence the name.

Tunnel crankcases appeared in the 1930s with the first high-speed diesel engines. They were favoured by some makers more than others, notably Saurer in Switzerland and Maybach-Motorenbau GmbH (now MTU) Friedrichshafen. They are described as both 'tunnel crankcases' and 'roller bearing cranks'; the two aspects are related and it is unclear as to which gave rise to the other.

== Origins ==
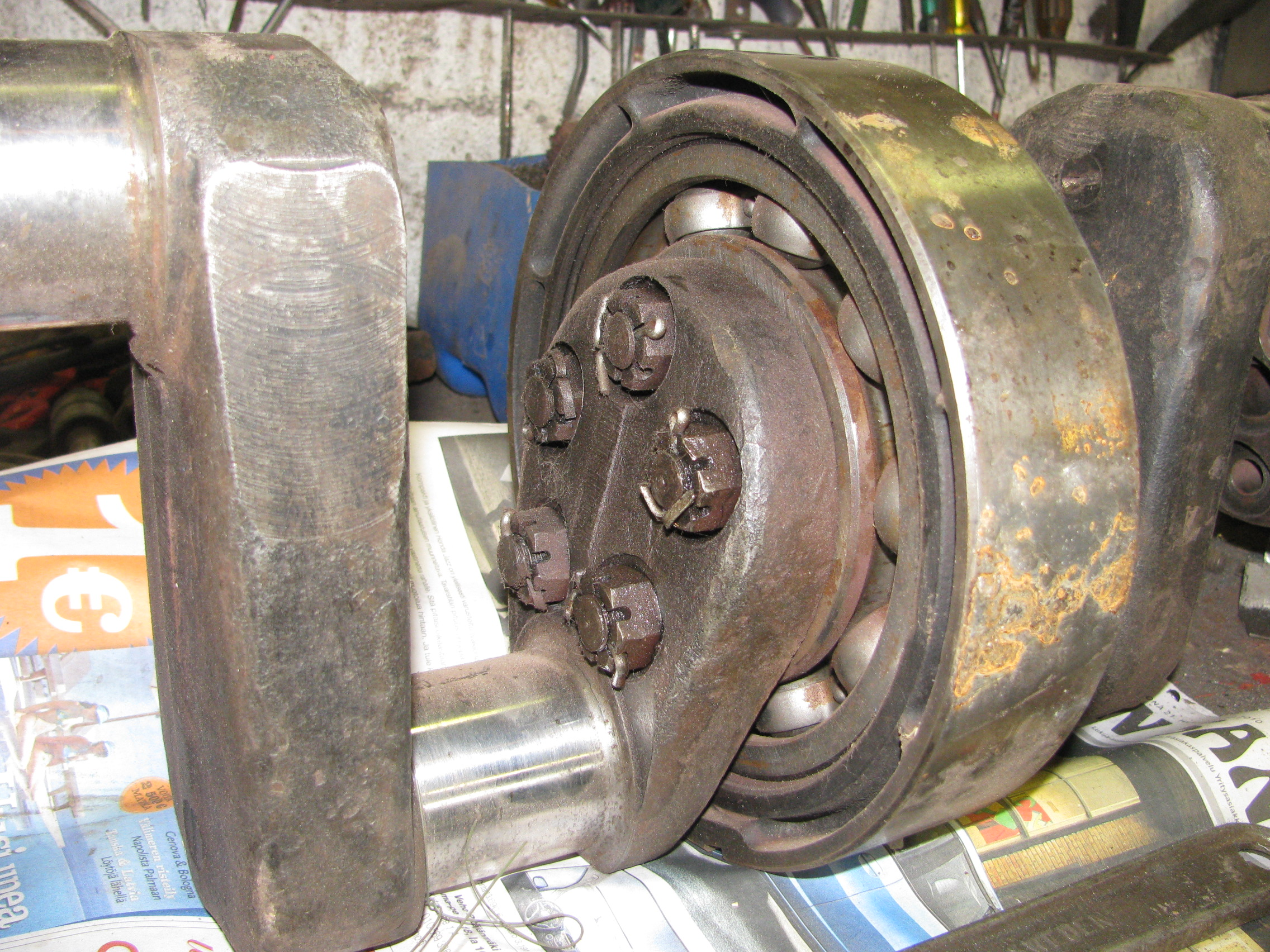
Semi-tunnel crankshaft from a Tatra T27 This is a built-up crankshaft with bolted webs. The crank bearings (excluding the bearing races) are smaller than the webs. The end bearings of this semi-tunnel crankshaft (not shown) are also of conventional small size.

With the development of the high-speed diesel engine around 1930, powerful diesel engines became available in the sizes previously used by lower-powered petrol engines. In particular, their high BMEP and high torque led to high forces on the crankshaft bearings. These forces were greater than could be sustained by the small whitemetal bearings used for petrol engines. Although aircraft and sports car engines in the 1920s developed to have considerable power in a small space, these were high maintenance machines with regular servicing. The new diesels were intended for long commercial service where maintenance was a key cost to be reduced.

The need for an improved bearing technology led to the adoption of roller bearings, rather than whitemetal. Although they might be considered esoteric today, ball and roller crankshaft bearings were already in use in the 1920s for such mundane engines as the Austin 7.

Roller bearings require one-piece races for both inner and outer bearing tracks. Although split races are possible, they are expensive and difficult to fit. (Note: Split-race roller bearings have been used for the centre big-end bearing in the connecting rod of some three-cylinder steam locomotives. As the crank axle is complex and also includes the wheels, it is impossible to fit roller bearings to the centre in any other way. Whitemetal bearings were much more common, but were a recognised weak point of some classes, such as the LNER A4) A simpler means of fitting roller bearings is to enlarge the diameter of the bearing, so that it becomes larger than the entire crankshaft web. Assembly is now done by putting the outer race of the bearing over the crankshaft axially from one end, rather than by assembling two pieces radially.

An early development was the semi-tunnel crankshaft. This used large ball or roller bearings of the tunnel style for their centre bearings, but the end bearings (carrying the load of pistons on only a single side) remained with a small diameter bearing of conventional style. This reduced the bearing cost, and also reduced the linear speed of these smaller bearings. This was important as it also reduced the speed of the crankcase oil seals alongside them.

Roller bearing crankshafts were favoured in central Europe: Germany, Switzerland and Czechoslovakia, owing to the local development and predominance of rolling-element bearings, in contrast to the improved metallurgy being developed for plain bearing materials in the English-speaking world.

=== Maybach petrol engines ===
Tunnel crankshafts were only rarely applied to petrol engines. The development of large powerful engines, outside the rarefied aerospace materials of aircraft engines, coincided with the development of practical lightweight diesel engines that tended to supplant petrol.

One market that remained with petrol was that of engines for airships, a market in which Maybach was predominant. Although diesel engines were developed for airship use, these were generally unsuccessful. The British Beardmore Tornado was based on medium-speed diesel engine practice and was both heavy, underpowered and unreliable. Only Maybach made significant use of tunnel crankshafts for petrol engines, with both its airship engines and also a number of World War II tank engines, such as the Maybach HL210 and HL230. These engines were used across all of the German medium and heavy tanks. Thousands of these engines were produced, although surviving examples are now extremely rare, particularly in working order.

=== Maybach diesel engines ===
After the war, Maybach applied its knowledge of compact, high-speed engines to diesel engines, for the emerging market in diesel railway locomotives. These engines contrasted with those from other makers by being particularly powerful, both by weight and by volume. This was especially the case for the length, as Maybach's engines used a compact V layout at a time when most makers were still building long single-bank inline engines. Maybach's name became particularly associated with the tunnel crankcase design and these engines are still the best-known uses of the tunnel crankshaft. These engines were widely used in Germany, for locomotives such as the V200 class. In the UK they were both imported and also built locally under licence. Following German practice, these high-speed engines were used in conjunction with a hydraulic transmission, in order to produce a powerful, but lightweight locomotive, compared to the competing diesel-electric designs. The engines were also sold to the USA, although there they were used in the more established diesel-electric designs.

== Built-up and one-piece cranks ==
The first tunnel crankshafts were built-up with webs bolted to the side of the main bearings, much as for a conventional crankshaft, only larger (see cross-section illustration of the Saurer engine). Examples of these were also built by John Fowler & Co. in England.

A tunnel crankshaft, fractured through one crankpin

A later development was to enlarge the main bearings sufficiently to be larger than the entire crank web. This now permitted the use of a one piece crankshaft

A tunnel crankshaft is considered to be a 'tunnel' if the outside diameter over the outer race of the installed bearings is larger than the maximum size of the webs. Early, or smaller, engines may have had crankshafts with bearing journals (Note: The 'journal' is the part of the shaft forming the bearing, the bearing races are a separate component that fits over this.) smaller than this, but were still considered as such because they were larger when the bearings were fitted.

To avoid passing the entire crankshaft through the bearings, the bearing diameters were usually stepped in size, in a conical progression. Each bearing now only needed to be slid through the length of its own width, being small enough to pass easily through any preceding housings. This meant that the crankshaft could only be inserted from one end of the crankcase.

== Advantages ==
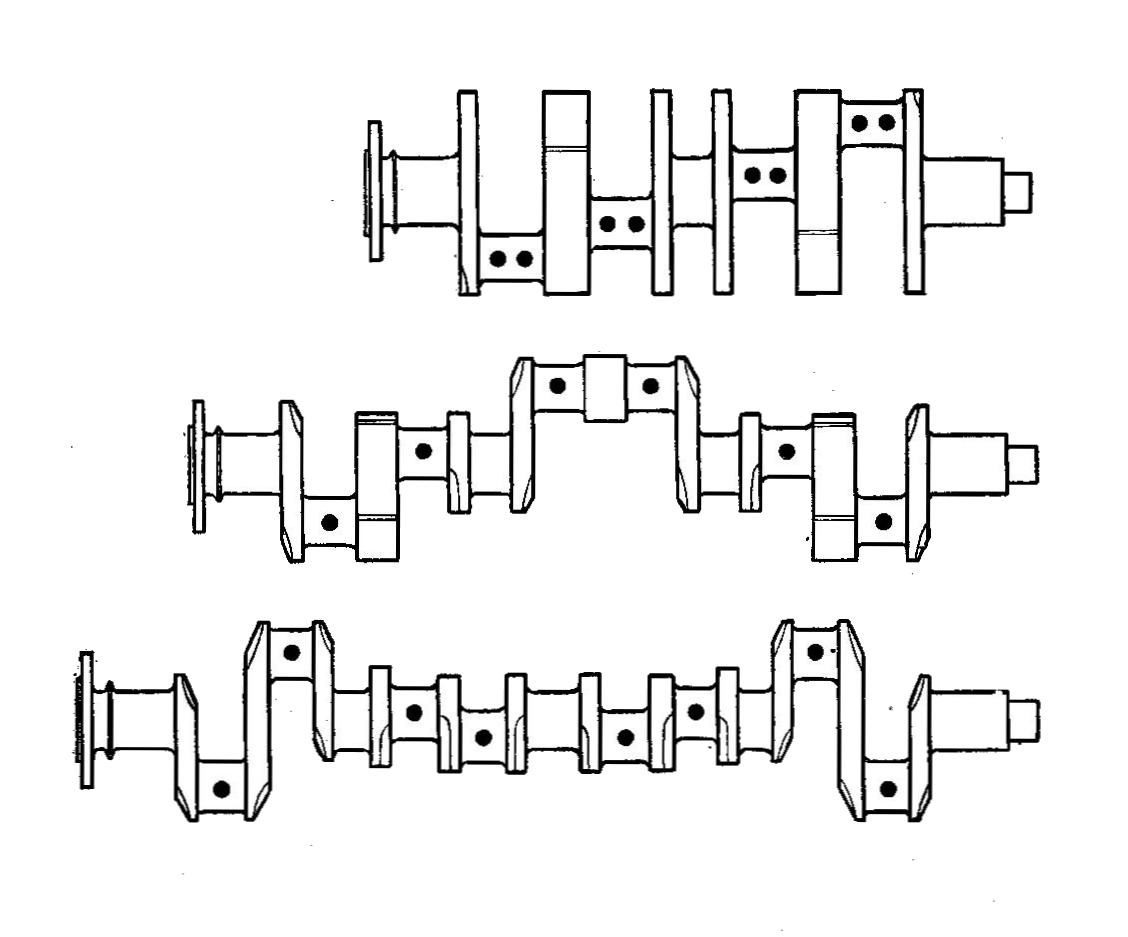
Relative lengths of crankshafts V8 tunnel crankcase engine Straight 6 engine with conventional crank Straight 8 engine with conventional crank

Bearing diameter

Larger bearings can support the loads of these higher-force engines.

Use of roller bearings

These can cope with the greater forces and higher speeds of the new high-speed engines.

Assembly

The crankshaft can be inserted into an assembled crankcase, rather than the bearing caps being assembled around it. This is usually done by rotating the crankcase end-upwards and then lowering the crankshaft vertically into it.

This was a noted feature of some 1960s Maybach engines, used for diesel locomotives.

Reduced crankshaft length

The length previously required for one (web + bearing + web) group is now replaced by a single bearing length, also acting as both webs.

As this reduced crankshaft length also reduces the spacing between cylinders, it was one factor in encouraging the use of tunnel crankshafts in V engines, where there is more axial distance available between adjacent cylinders. This further reduces the overall length of tunnel crankshaft engines.

Increased crankshaft stiffness

The crankshaft, particularly along the webs, becomes wider and so stiffer.

== Disadvantages ==
Increased linear bearing speed

By simple geometry, as the bearing diameter increases, so too does the linear speed at the bearing surface. This exceeds that possible for whitemetal bearings. Roller bearings were thus not only one reason for the enlarged tunnel crankshaft, but they were also made necessary by it.

Crankshaft manufacturing

The diameter and mass of the crankshaft is increased, such that it will no longer fit into standard crankshaft grinding machines and may require specialised machinery for their manufacture. Although the reduced length of the crankshaft may allow large engines to be built with shorter machinery.

Crankshaft inertia

The enlarged webs have greater mass, thus greater rotational inertia, particularly as they place this mass at the greatest radius away from the axis of the crankshaft. This gives an engine that is slower to accelerate, although it also means that the engine maintains a constant speed more easily under a rapidly varying load.

For this reason, the tunnel crankshaft is most appropriate to engines running for long periods at constant speed, such as generator sets, railway locomotives and boats. They are not used for cars, where rapid acceleration and deceleration is needed.

Crankcase rigidity

The large amount of material removed from the crankcase to provide the tunnel does not allow as much space for stiffening webs across the crankcase, so the overall rigidity of the crankcase may be less.

== Two-stroke engines ==
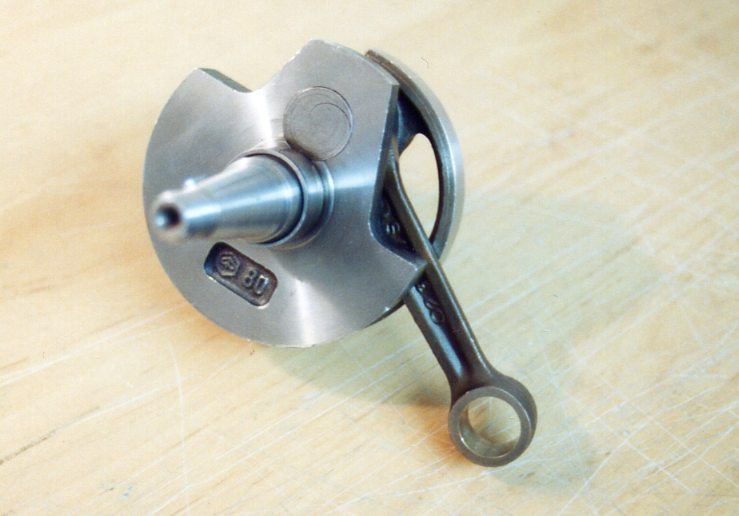
Small two stroke crankshaft with disk webs, but not a tunnel crankshaft

Many small crankcase compression two-stroke engines have a crankshaft with large circular webs, similar to the tunnel crankshaft. However these webs are merely webs, not bearings, and their bearings are of conventional small diameter alongside the webs. These enlarged webs are used instead to increase the compression ratio of the engine. By filling more of the 'dead' crankcase volume, the ratio between the swept volume of the cylinder and the remaining crankcase volume is increased.

Some multi-cylinder two-stroke engines also use crankcase compression, almost all of them marine outboard motors. In these engines, the separate crankcase volume for each cylinder must be kept separate. The webs are thus made circular, large and sealed by gas seals on their outer circumference. Again, these are not considered as tunnel crankshafts if the webs only carry a seal, but may be so if the large web also forms the bearing.

== See also ==
- Eccentric, a similar approach for cranks that are driven by the axle, particularly for steam locomotive valve gear. The eccentric is enlarged in diameter until it too is bigger than the overall diameter of the crank web.
- Undercut crankshaft, a technique for shortening the overall length of a crankshaft by overlapping the bearings.
