= Jenbacher J624 =

Overview
- Manufacturer: Jenbacher
- Production: 2007-2011 (Non-turbo); 2011-Ongoing (Twin-turbo)

Layout
- Configuration: V24 engine
- Displacement: 6.24 L (380.8 cu in) (per cylinder); 149.7 L (9,135.3 cu in) total
- Cylinder bore: 19 cm (7 in)
- Piston stroke: 22 cm (9 in)

RPM range
- Max. engine speed: 1500 RPM

Combustion
- Turbocharger: 2-stage twin turbo
- Fuel type: Natural gas, biomethane, sewage gases, flare gas, landfill gas, coke/coal gas, wood gas, pyrolysis gas
- Cooling system: Water-cooled

Output
- Power output: Range based on any applicable fuel: 4,459 kW (5,980 hp)-4,507 kW (6,044 hp); Based only on natural gas: 4,491 kW (6,023 hp)

Dimensions
- Length: 11.6 m (38 ft)
- Width: 2.2 m (7.2 ft)
- Height: 2.8 m (9.2 ft)
- Dry weight: 52,100 kg (114,900 lb)

The Jenbacher J624 is a natural gas engine with a twin-turbocharged V24 layout. First produced in 2007, it was refitted in June of 2010 to be the world's first twin-turbocharged natural gas engine and released in that configuration in 2011. It is used for generating electricity and can run on a wide variety of fuels, including waste products.

Jenbacher markets the J624 as being environmentally friendly, highlighting case studies on their website in which they offer emissions reduction packages and power generation that consumes already-present waste products.

The J624 is currently being used for the STAWAG Charging Station in Aachen, Germany; the Stadtwerke power plant in Bad Reichenhall, Germany; the plastic plant in Barranquilla, Colombia; the Biohof Querdel organic farm in Sassenberg, Germany (a renewable application, according to Jenbacher); the El Gabar Al Asfar Wastewater Treatment Plant in Al-Qalyubia, Egypt; and a paper mill in an undisclosed location in mainland China.
