= Suzuki RG500 =

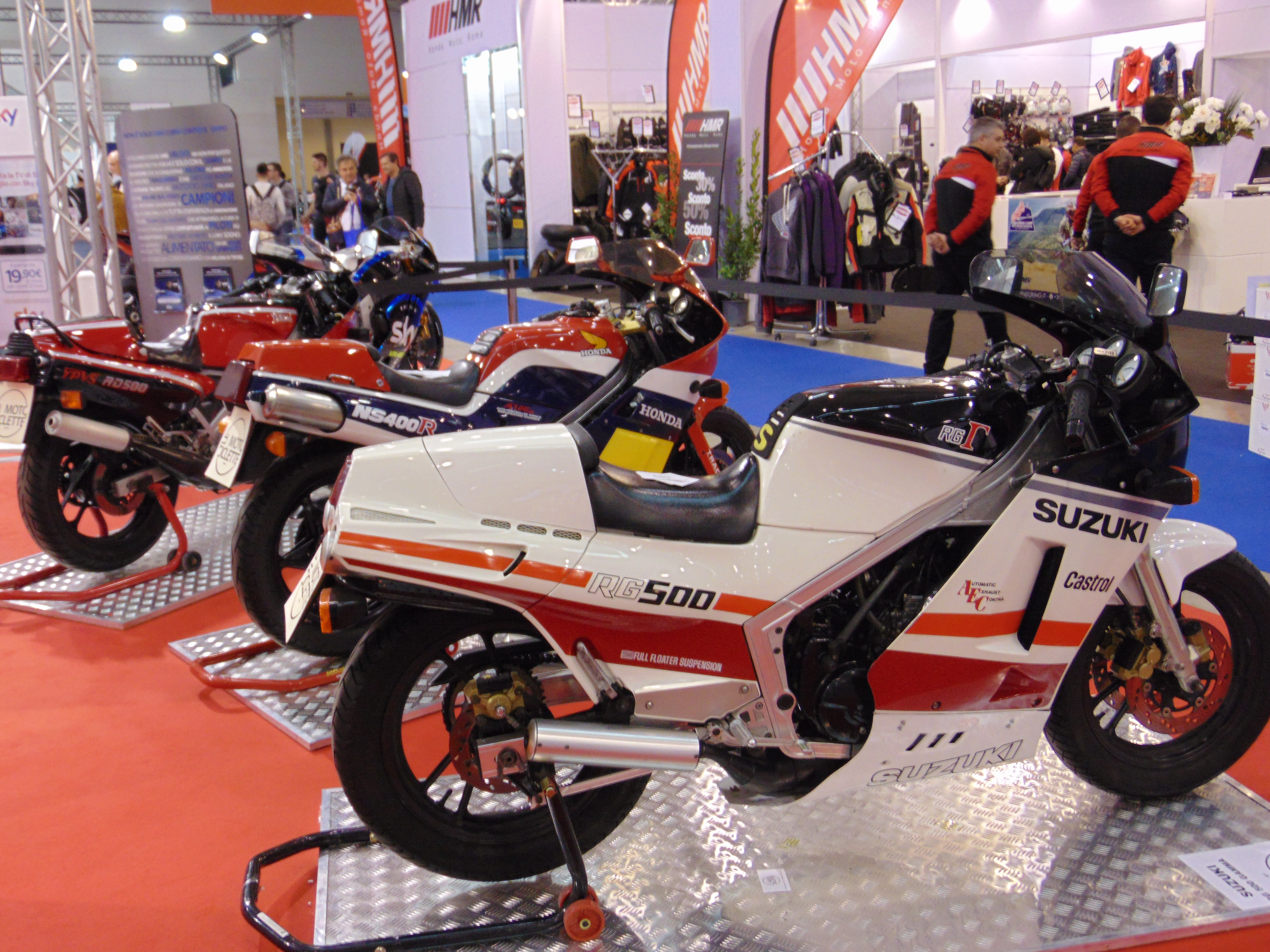
- Manufacturer: Suzuki
- Production: 1985–1989
- Class: Sport bike
- Engine: 498.5 cc (30.42 cu in) two-stroke, four-cylinder U engine, liquid-cooled
- Bore / stroke: 56 mm × 50.6 mm (2.20 in × 1.99 in)
- Compression ratio: 7.0:1
- Ignition type: CDI
- Transmission: Cassette-type 6-speed constant mesh manual, chain final drive
- Frame type: Box-section aluminum, double cradle
- Suspension: Front: 38 mm telescopic fork with hydraulic anti-dive Rear: full-floater swing arm
- Brakes: Front: dual 260 mm discs with four-piston calipers Rear: 210 mm disc with twin-piston caliper
- Tires: Front: 110/90-16; Rear: 130/80-17
- Wheelbase: 1,425 mm (56.1 in)
- Dimensions: L: 2,100 mm (83 in); W: 695 mm (27.4 in); H: 1,185 mm (46.7 in)
- Seat height: 770 mm (30 in)
- Fuel capacity: 22 L (4.8 imp gal; 5.8 US gal)
- Related: Suzuki RG250

The Suzuki RG500 "Gamma", a sports motorcycle with a two-stroke engine, was made by Suzuki from 1985 to 1989.

The RG "Gamma" 500 was directly based on the series of Suzuki RG Γ 500 Grand Prix motorcycles with almost identical features to the official two-stroke machines used by Italian world champion Franco Uncini during the 1984 season with the Gallina team. The RG Γ 500 won two consecutive Riders' Championships in the 500 cc class with Marco Lucchinelli in 1981 and Franco Uncini in 1982. Like its GP forebears, the road-going RG was powered by a 498 cc naturally aspirated, rotary-valve inducted, twin crank square four two-stroke engine. This engine employed thermostatically controlled liquid-cooling by means of a front-mounted radiator.

Suzuki used an aluminum box-section frame with castings for the headstock and rear swing arm. The front suspension had pre-load adjustment, as well as an anti-dive system called Posi Damp. Such anti-dive systems were a common feature on early 1980s sports bikes intended to control the tendency of a motorcycle's nose to dive under braking. At the rear, the full-floater suspension used a conventional double-sided swinging arm.

== RG400 ==
A smaller 397 cc derivative, known as the RG400, was also developed and produced alongside the 500. This machine appeared identical to its bigger brother in every way, making use of the same frame, suspension, and gearbox. However, the main differences between the two were a reduced bore width (50mm instead of 56mm) with power output reduced to 59 bhp (44 kW), different big end roller bearings (some roller-less), clutch disks unit, front brakes (non floating discs), silencers, and 'RG400' stickers on the fairings.

The RG400 was produced and sold within Asian markets: its 397cc capacity and 59 bhp (44 kW) output complied with a restricted Japanese motorcycle driving licence of the time.

== Production numbers ==
Model	1985	1986	1987	Total
RG500	7340	1412	532	9284
RG400	5002	863	348	6213
