= V24 engine =

24-cylinder piston engine

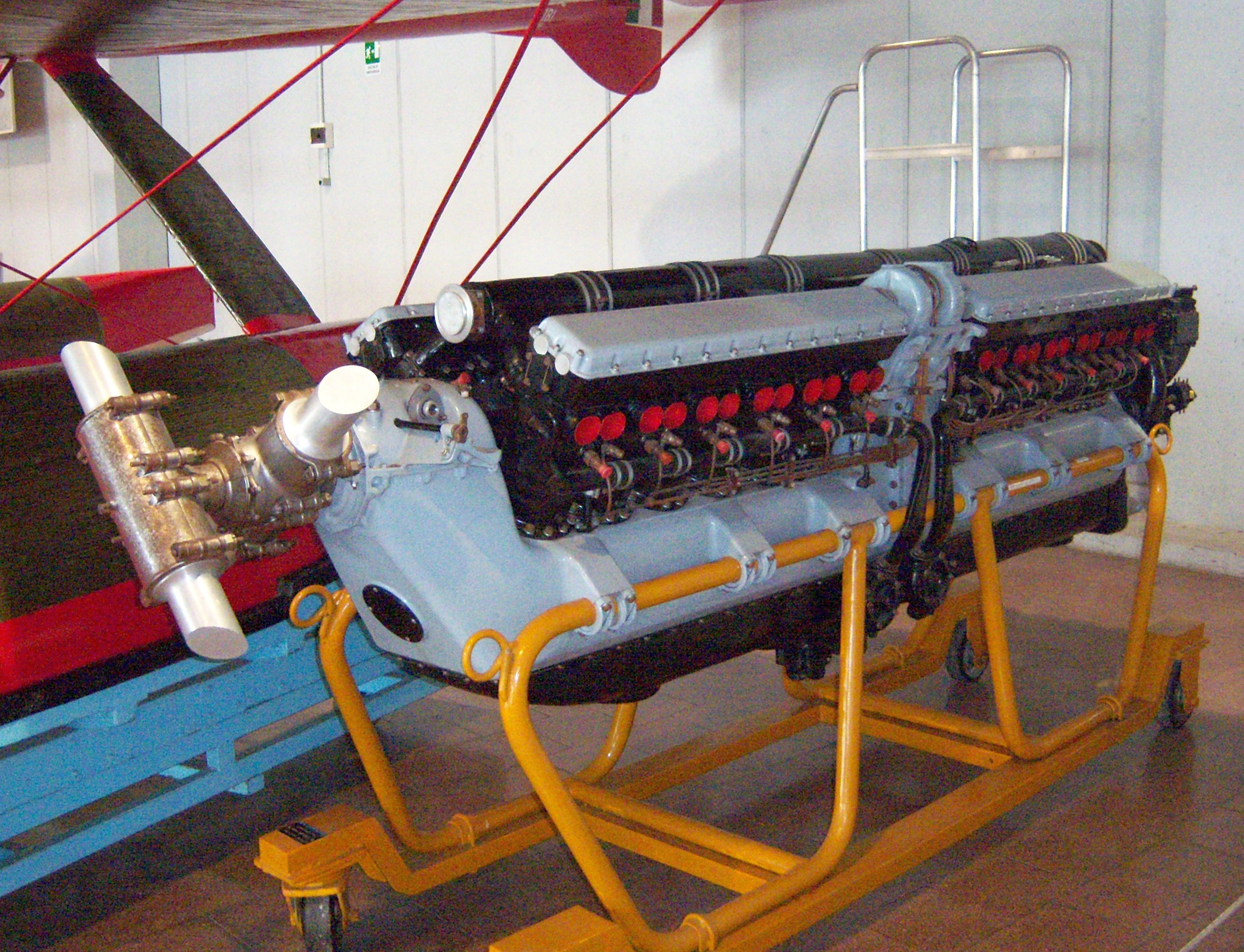
Fiat AS.6 aircraft engine

A V24 engine is a 24-cylinder piston engine where two banks of twelve cylinders are arranged in a V-shaped configuration around a single crankshaft. The majority of V24 engines are "dual V12" engines, where two separate V12 engines are placed in line with each other. It has been used in certain equipment, like locomotives. Examples included the EMD E-series, these include the E9, which developed 2,400 hp, and E8, which made 2,250 hp.

== Fiat AS.6 engine ==
The Fiat AS.6 engine was built in the early 1930s to power the Macchi M.C.72 plane, which was intended to compete in the 1931 Schneider Trophy air races. This engine was formed by mounting two Fiat AS.5 V12 engines one behind the other, with the front engine powering the rear propeller and the rear engine powering the front propeller. The combined displacement was more than 50 L (3,051 cu in) and the combined power output was approximately 2,900 hp (2,160 kW).

Mechanical problems prevented the airplane from competing. The Macchi M.C.72 achieved an average top speed of 709.2 km/h (440.7 mph) on 23 October 1934. This set the record for a piston-powered seaplane, which still stands.

== Detroit Diesel 24V71 ==
The Detroit Diesel Series 71 24V71 engine had a displacement of 27.92 L (1,704 cu in) and 1,500 kW (2,000 hp). They were manufactured from 1994 to 1997.

== Jenbacher J624 ==
One of the few, if not the only, V24 engines in production is the Austrian-made Jenbacher J624 gas engine for electric power generation and CHP applications. The engine makes use of two-stage turbocharging. It offers a bore and stroke of 190 by 220 mm (7.5 by 8.7 in). The total swept volume of the 24-cylinder engine is 149.7 L (9,135.3 cu in). Depending on application, the engine can operate on various fuels with the genset generating up to 4,507 kW (6,044 hp).
