= Bugatti U-16 =

U engine designed by Ettore Bugatti

U-16
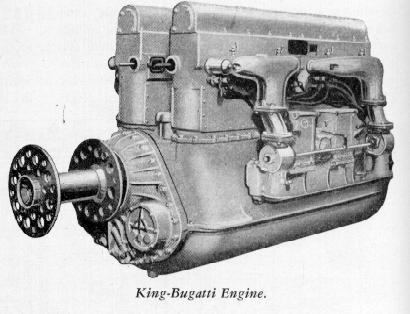
- The King-Bugatti U-16
- Type: Piston aircraft engine
- Manufacturer: Bugatti / Duesenberg Motor Corporation
- First run: 1916

The Bugatti U-16 was a 16-cylinder water-cooled double-8 vertical in-line "U engine", designed by Ettore Bugatti in 1915 to 1916 and built in France in small numbers. The US Bolling Commission bought a license to build the engine in the US, and small numbers of a slightly revised version were built by the Duesenberg Motor Corporation as the King-Bugatti. Probably about 40 King-Bugattis were made before the end of World War I caused building contracts to be canceled.

== Design and development ==
The U-16 engine was designed to use as many features of a previous Bugatti 8-cylinder in-line "straight-eight" engine as possible. Two eight-cylinder banks were mounted vertically side by side on a common cast aluminium crankcase, each bank driving its own crankshaft. The two crankshafts were geared to and drove a single common airscrew shaft. The shaft was bored to accept a 37-mm gun barrel, and a clear passage was provided through the crankcase in line with the shaft boring for the same purpose. Each eight-cylinder bank was made up of two cast iron four-cylinder blocks; the crankshafts were each made up of two standard four-cylinder crankshafts joined end to end by a fine taper cone joint. To reduce overall length, these crankshafts were undercut: a typical Bugatti approach, where only their unlimited budget and attention to detail could afford such complexities.

A bevel gear at the junction drove a vertical shaft from which the single overhead camshaft and dual magnetos for each bank were driven. Two magnetos were mounted on the outside of each cylinder bank. Each magneto fired all eight cylinders for that bank, driven by bevel gear from the vertical shaft that also drove the bank's single overhead camshaft. Each cylinder had two vertical inlet valves and a single vertical exhaust valve, all driven by rocking levers from the camshaft. Four carburettors each fed four cylinders via a water jacketed manifold. Each cylinder exhausted into an individual pipe in the space between the cylinder blocks. The whole construction was protected by patents until 1935.

The engine completed ten-hour and fifty-hour endurance tests in 1917, and the French government purchased a license and arranged for production by Peugeot. During the fifty-hour test a US sergeant who was observing the test for the Bolling Commission was killed by the propeller, becoming the first US serviceman to die on active service during World War I.

=== The Bolling Commission and the "Bugatti Mission" ===
In 1917 a US military mission headed by Colonel R.C. Bolling visited Europe to choose aero engines to be produced for the Aviation Section, Signal Corps. The mission was accompanied by a group of civilian experts headed by the engine manufacturer Howard Marmon. The Bugatti U-16 aroused interest and Marmon arranged for a license to be purchased for $100,000 by the US government. In December 1917 a "Bugatti Mission" sailed from Bordeaux for the US to supervise production of the engine at the Duesenberg Motor Corporation of Elizabeth, New Jersey, where the engines were planned to be made.

=== US revisions ===
The US government engaged Colonel Charles Brady King, to redesign the engine for production in the US, much to Ettore Bugatti's irritation. Col. King was then an aeronautical mechanical engineer for the Signal Corps, and head of its division of engine design.

A prototype engine was sent to McCook Field near Dayton, Ohio after only 37 hours of testing. It was then decided to send it with Colonel King to Duesenberg for further development. In February, 1918, this engine blew apart due to structural weakness. King improved some of the design details of the engine, such as the lack of water cooling around the valve seats and the close pitch of valves. Accordingly, King's revisions to the design altered the cylinder heads to provide freer water circulation, better valve cooling, and a slight increase in the distance between valve centres.

=== Post World War I developments ===
Neither Bugatti's U-16 or the King-Bugatti were particularly successful engines. Few were installed in aircraft, and even fewer actually flew. After World War I no further developments were made in the US, while in France Breguet took over the license and continued development under the designation "Type U-24". In 1920 Breguet showed a "quadrimoteur" made of two Type U-16s coupled together, with provision to de-clutch any cylinder bank to enable it to be stopped while the other three units continued to provide power.

== Variants ==
Bugatti U-16
(1915)
King-Bugatti
(1918)

=== Breguet ===
Breguet-Bugatti U.16
The licence built U.16, essentially similar to the King-Bugatti but with reduced bore to improve reliability
Breguet-Bugatti U.24
An increased displacement U-16 engine
Breguet-Bugatti U.24bis
Breguet-Bugatti 32A Quadrimotor Type A
Two U.24s mounted in tandem, nose to nose with a combining gearbox between the engine halves, driving the propeller through an extension shaft passing through the cylinder banks of the forward engine half.
Breguet-Bugatti 32B Quadrimotor Type B
A development of the quadrimotor concept with four U-16 8-cylinder blocks mounted in an 'H' configuration, driving a single propeller via a combining gearbox though centrifugal clutches.

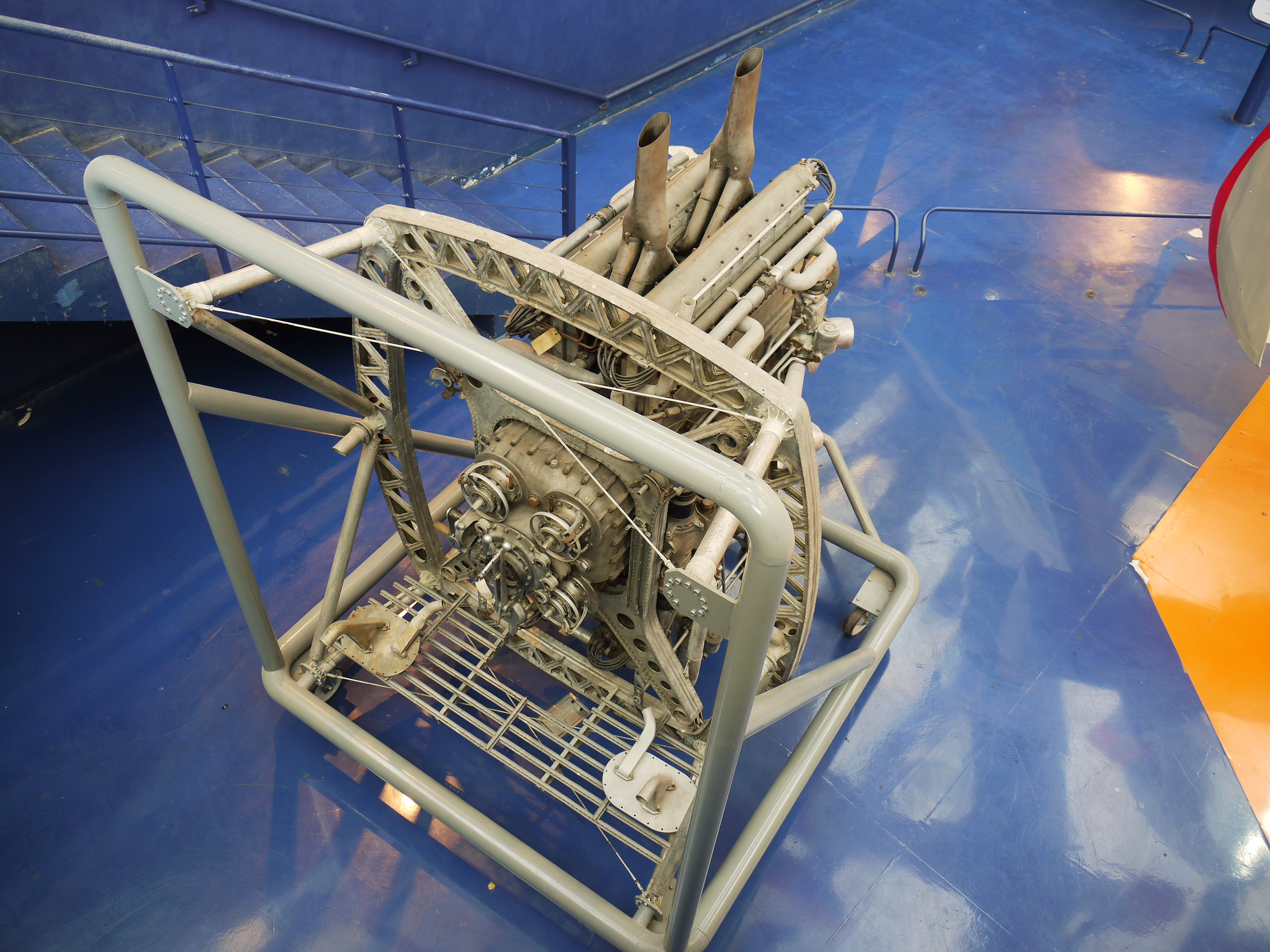
A Quadrimoteur type B on display at the Musée de l'Air et de l'Espace, le Bourget, Paris.

Breguet-Bugatti H-32B
Alternative designation for the type 32B Quadrimoteur.

== Applications ==
Bugatti U-16
Morane-Saulnier AN, 1918 prototype fighter aircraft
King-Bugatti
Packard-Le Père LUSAC-21
Breguet-Bugatti
Breguet XIX, 1921 (but not flown with this engine)
Breguet 20 "Leviathan", 1920.
Breguet 21 "Leviathan", 1921.
Breguet 22.

== Engines on display ==
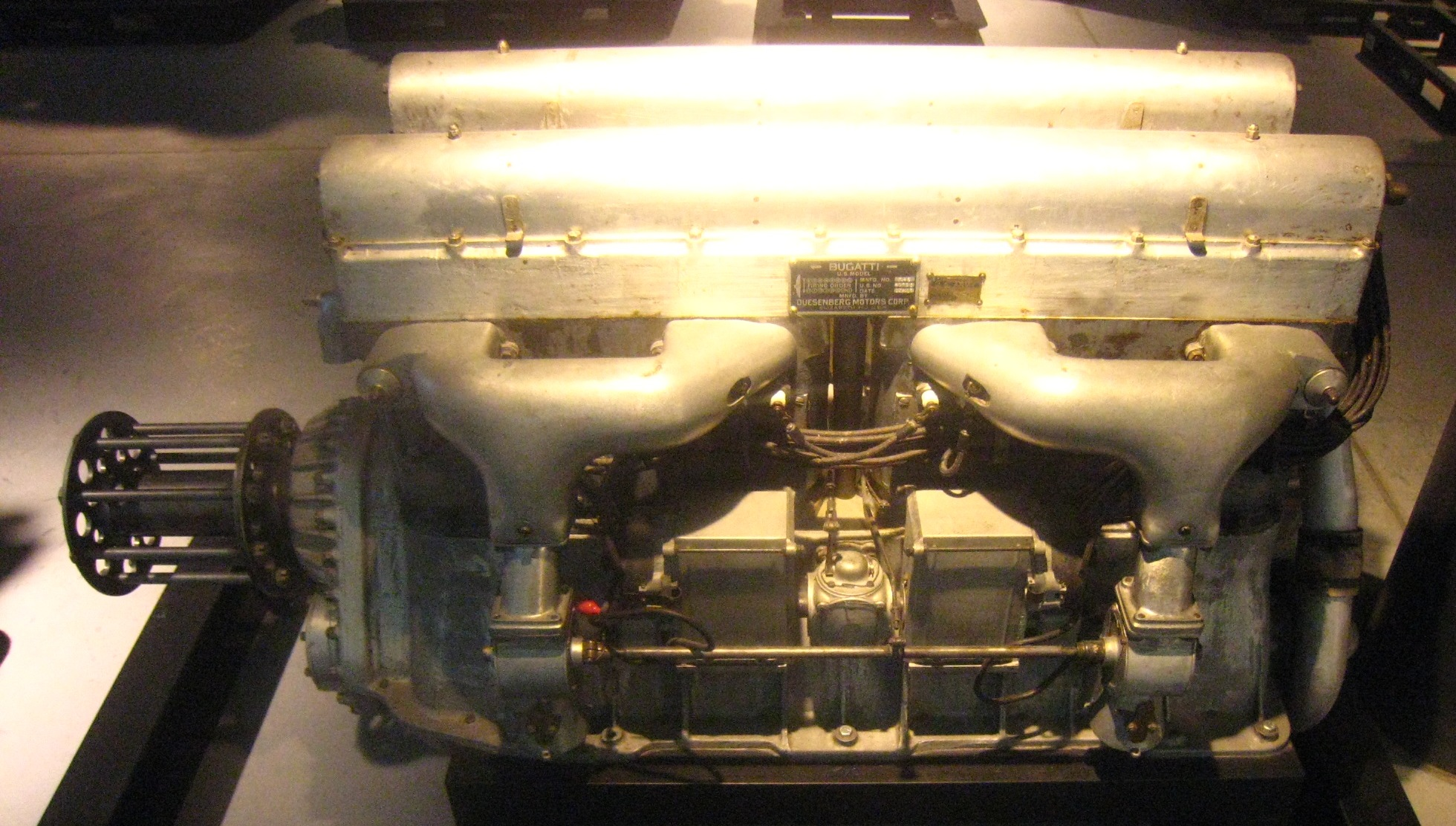
A King Bugatti on display

The Musee de l'air at Chalais-Meudon, 2 rue des Vertugadins, Meudon (just outside the Paris boundaries in the south west direction) holds a French U-16 engine and two Breguet-Bugatti engines. A King-Bugatti can be seen at the National Air Museum of the Smithsonian Institution in Washington, D.C., and another in the USAF museum at the Wright-Patterson AF Base at Fairborn, Ohio. The Auburn-Cord-Duesenberg Museum in Auburn, Indiana also has a King-Bugatti engine on display in their Hall of Technology

== Specifications (King-Bugatti) ==
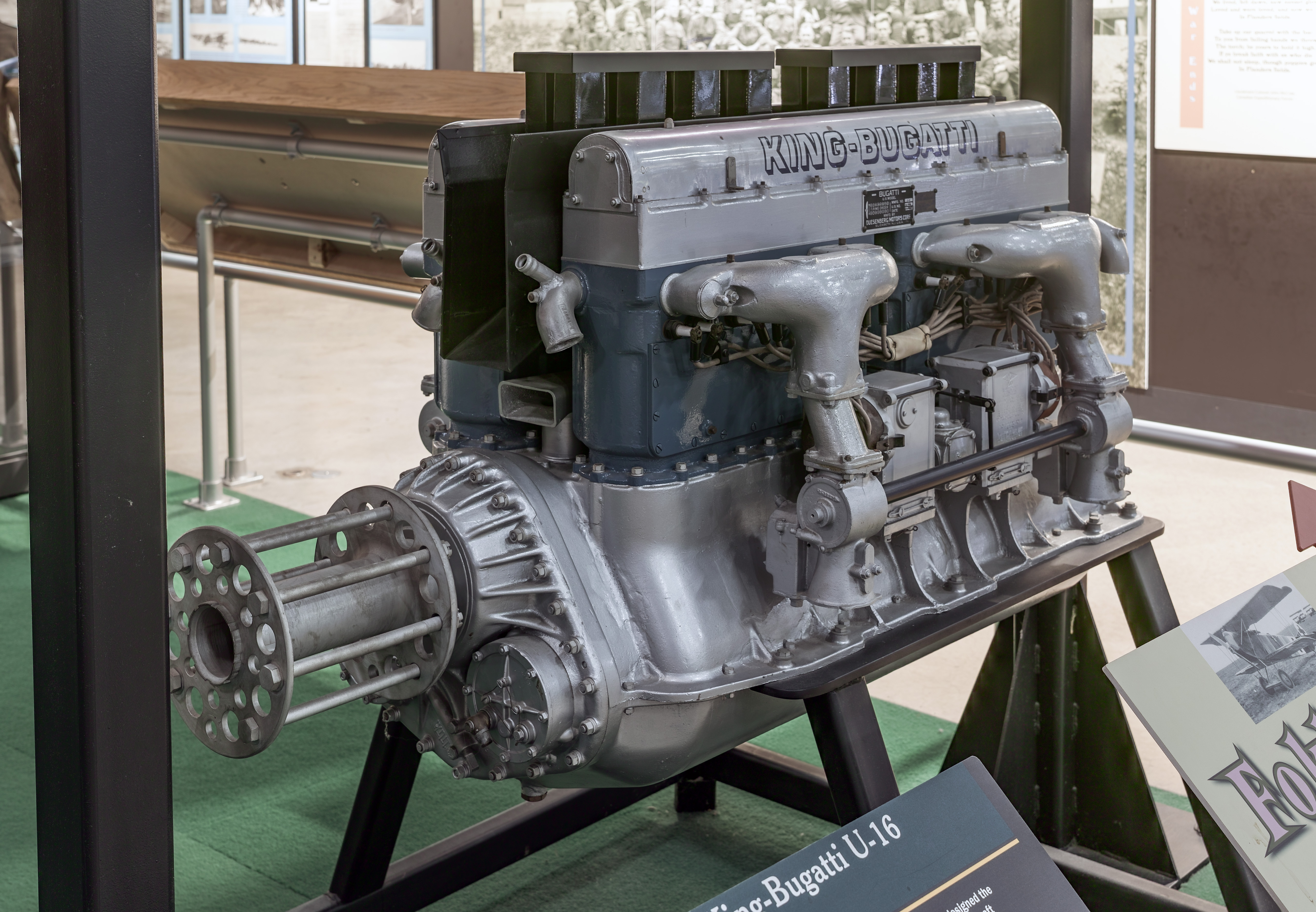
A front three-quarter view of the King-Bugatti U-16 aviation engine from the National Museum of the Air Force at Wright-Patterson near Dayton, OH.

Data from Jane's fighting aircraft of World War I, Jane's All the World's Aircraft 1919 except where indicated. Later specifications quote slightly varied detail dimensions and increased horsepower ratings.

=== General characteristics ===
- Type: 16-cylinder water-cooled double vertical in-line engine
- Bore: 4.33 in (110 mm)
- Stroke: 6.3 in (160 mm)
- Displacement: 1,484.3 cu in (24.3 L)
- Length: about 44.25 in (1,124 mm)
- Width: about 24.8 in (630 mm)
- Height: about 32.28 in (820 mm)
- Dry weight: 1,286 lb (583.3 kg)

=== Components ===
- Valvetrain: Split overhead camshaft per cylinder bank operating 3 valves per cylinder (2 inlet, one exhaust), driven by a shaft and bevel gers from the centre of the crankshaft.
- Fuel system: 4 carburettors, one for each bank of four cylinders
- Fuel type: Petrol
- Oil system: Dry sump, one scavenging pump and one pressure pump each driven from the front ends of the camshafts
- Cooling system: Water-cooled
- Reduction gear: 0.6666
- 4x Dixie 800 magnetos

=== Performance ===
- Power output: 410 hp (306 kW) at 2,000 rpm
- Compression ratio: 5:1
- Power-to-weight ratio: 0.42 hp/lb (0.7 kW/kg)

== See also ==
Related lists

- List of aircraft engines
