= Bréguet 20 Leviathan =

Bréguet 20, 21 and 22 Leviathan

General information
- Type: 22-seat, twin-engine airliner
- National origin: France
- Manufacturer: Société Anonyme des Ateliers d'Aviation Louis Bréguet
- Number built: 1

History
- First flight: 1922-3

The Bréguet Leviathan was a family of large all-metal biplane aircraft built in France in the early 1920s. The Bréguet XX and XXI were notable for being powered by Bréguet-Bugatti multiple engines, in two forms. The Bréguet XXI was powered by individual Bréguet-Bugatti U.16 engines initially and Lorraine-Dietrich 8b engines in tandem later. The Bréguet XXII had accommodation for about twenty passengers and was destroyed during a 1923 transport aircraft competition. Development of all three aircraft types was halted largely due to technical issues with power-plants and aircraft structure.

== Development and design ==
=== Bréguet XX and Bréguet XXI ===
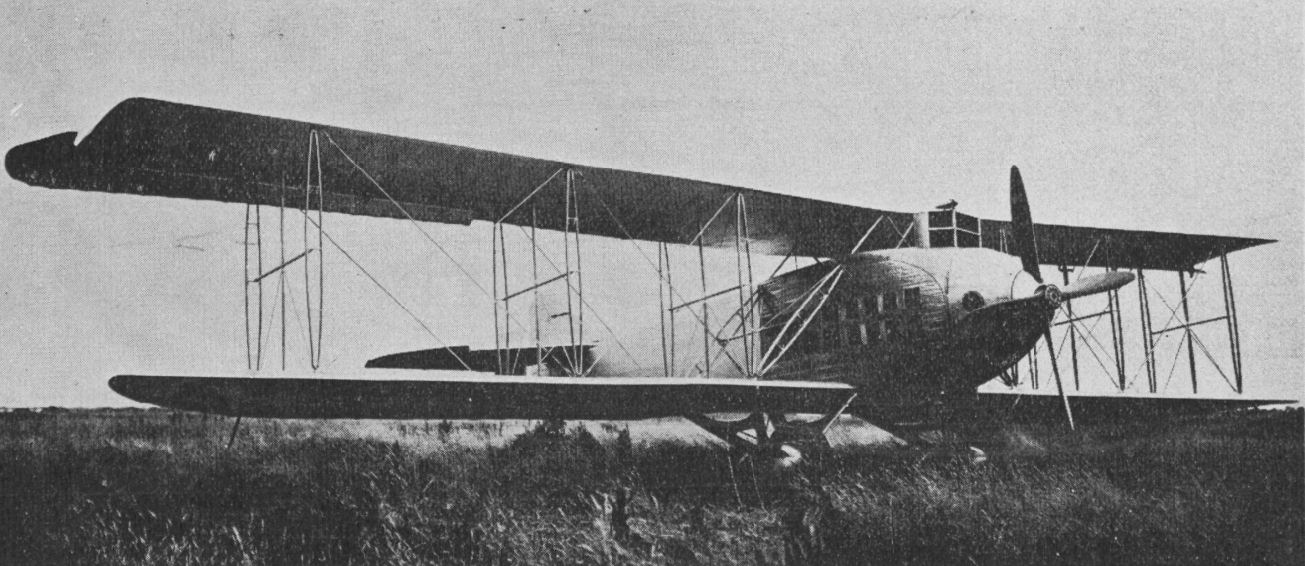
Bréguet XX Leviathan photo from L'Aerophile July,1922

In 1922 Bréguet Aviation flew both their all-metal Bréguet 19, a bomber/reconnaissance aircraft and the Bréguet XX. The latter was another all-metal biplane but much larger and powered by a Bréguet-Bugatti 32A Quadimoteur Type A, (two Bréguet-Bugatti U.24 engines mounted in tandem on a cradle, driving a single output shaft), with a single output shaft, for the first time on 20 June 1922. The engine assembly was placed in the forward fuselage and drove the nose-mounted single propeller via a shaft running through the forward engine half's cylinder banks from the combining gearbox between the two engine halves.

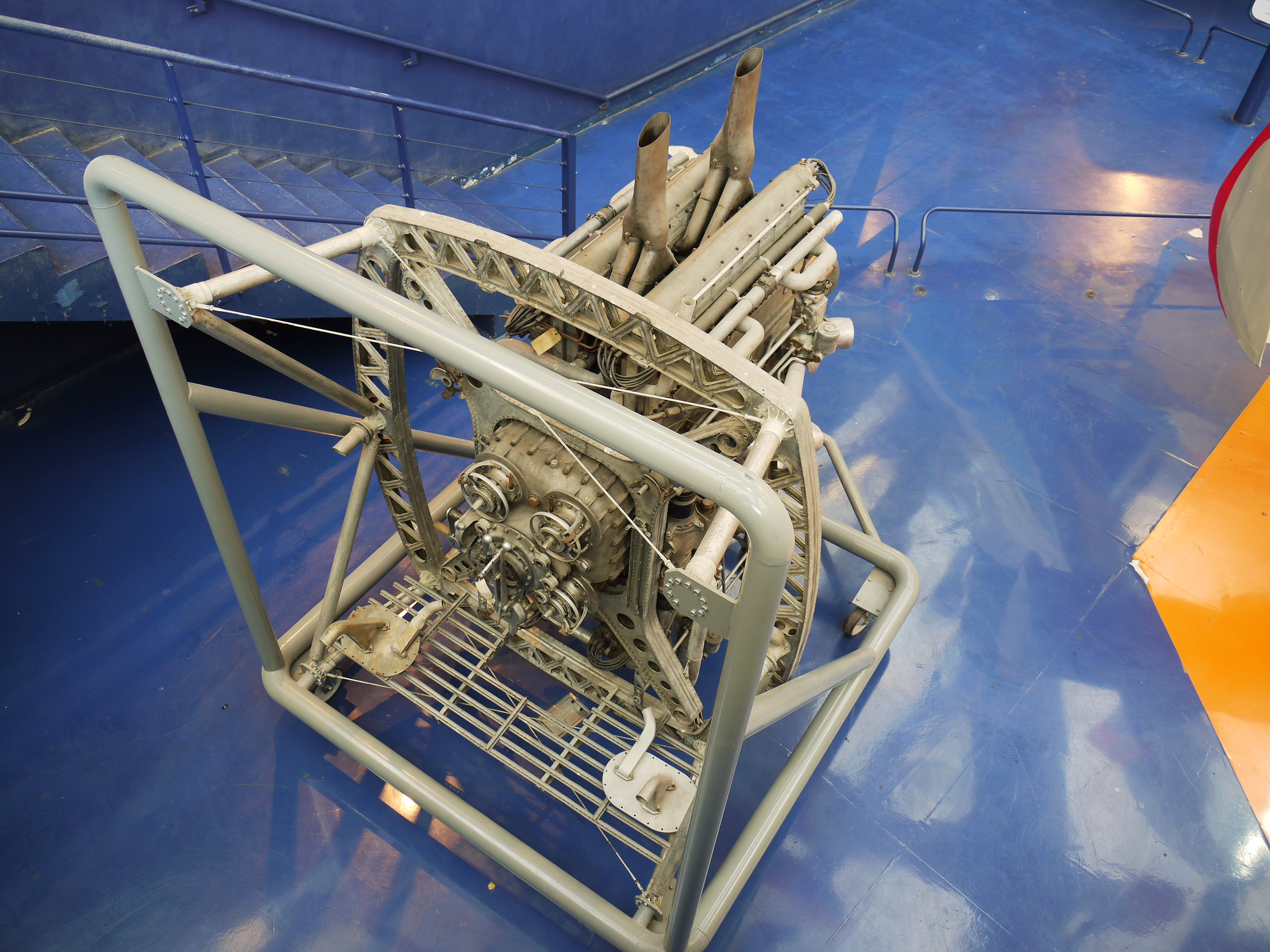
The sole Bréguet-Bugatti 32B Quadimoteur Type B with Bréguet XXI engine mounting frame on display at the Musée de l'Air et de l'Espace, Paris Le Bourget

A bomber variant, the Bréguet XXI, was also built with limited success; the partially built fuselage was displayed at the 1921 Paris Aero Salon, clearly showing the installation of the Bréguet-Bugatti 32A Quadimoteur Type A engine. The Bréguet XXI was later fitted with a Bréguet-Bugatti 32B Quadimoteur Type B, which grouped four 8-cylinder banks around a combining gearbox in an 'H' configuration.

Breguet 22 on display at the 1922 Paris Salon with fuselage side open to show seating

=== Bréguet XXII ===
Unlike the very successful Bréguet 19, the Bréguet 20 and 21 proved unsatisfactory and were developed into the otherwise very similar Bréguet 22, which had a pair of Breguet-Bugatti U.16s mounted between the wings on either side. Since the double engines could continue to run with one half shut down; the Bréguet XX and XXI and XXII were sometimes referred to as four-engined aircraft (e.g.L'Aerophile). Moving the engines from the fuselage to the wings freed the fuselage for a passenger cabin which could hold 22, a large number in those days. The Type XX, Type XXI and Type XXII were all referred to as Bréguet Leviathan by contemporaries.

The fuselages of the Type XX, Type XXI and Type XXII were similar flat-sided structures based on four cross-braced longerons, each of three parts. Since the nose of the XXII did not terminate in a propeller, the high cockpit of the XX was replaced with a blunt-nosed cabin, curved in planform, for the pilot. Behind him the passenger seats in the Type 22 were in pairs, each with their own window. Boarding and disembarking were reported as a little difficult. The wing-mounted engines led to revised wing plans and structures. The Bréguet 22 had equal-span, unstaggered wings of rectangular plan and three bays. The innermost bay was defined by the engine by the engine mountings, which placed the U.16s with their four-blade tractor propellers on multiple struts midway between the two wings. Radiators were mounted on the sides of the engine cowling. The outer bays were formed by single interplane struts with forked junctions into the wings, assisted by cross-bracing. At the rear the tail was, like that of the Type 20, quite small and conventional with the tailplane mounted on top of the fuselage but now carrying a pair of small additional fins. The landing gear was also conventional, with each fixed mainwheel mounted on a pair of substantial V-form legs from the wing spars under the inner bay. The Bréguet-Bugatti engines soon proved unreliable and by early 1923 the Type 22 was described as powered by four 270 hp (200 kW) Lorraine-Dietrich 8Bd water-cooled mounted in tractor/pusher pairs.

The sole Type 22 was destroyed in a fire following a forced landing in mid-September 1923 whilst competing for the Grand Prix pour Avions de Transport.

== Variants ==
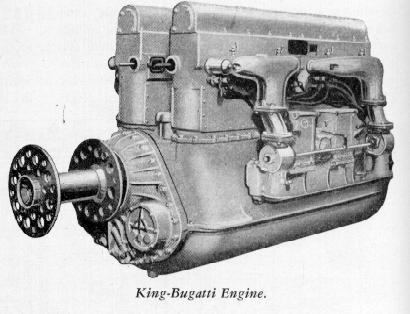
A King-Bugatti, almost identical to the Bréguet-Bugatti U.16, clearly showing the individual 8-cylinder banks

Bréguet XX Leviathan
(Bréguet 20 Leviathan) A large all-Duralumin biplane airliner powered by a Bréguet-Bugatti 32A Quadimoteur Type A multi-engine, mounted inside the forward fuselage.
Bréguet XXI Leviathan
(Bréguet 21 Leviathan) A bomber version of the Bréguet XX / XXII, powered initially by a Quadimoteur Type A multi-engine, but later fitted with a Bréguet-Bugatti 32B Quadimoteur Type B multi-engine, both mounted inside the forward fuselage.
Bréguet XXII Leviathan
(Bréguet 22 Leviathan) A development of the Bréguet XX powered initially by two individual Bréguet-Bugatti U.16 engines mounted conventionally between the wings and later by four Lorraine-Dietrich 8B V-8 engines mounted in tandem between the wings.

== Specifications (Bréguet XXII 2x Bréguet-Bugatti U.16 engines) ==
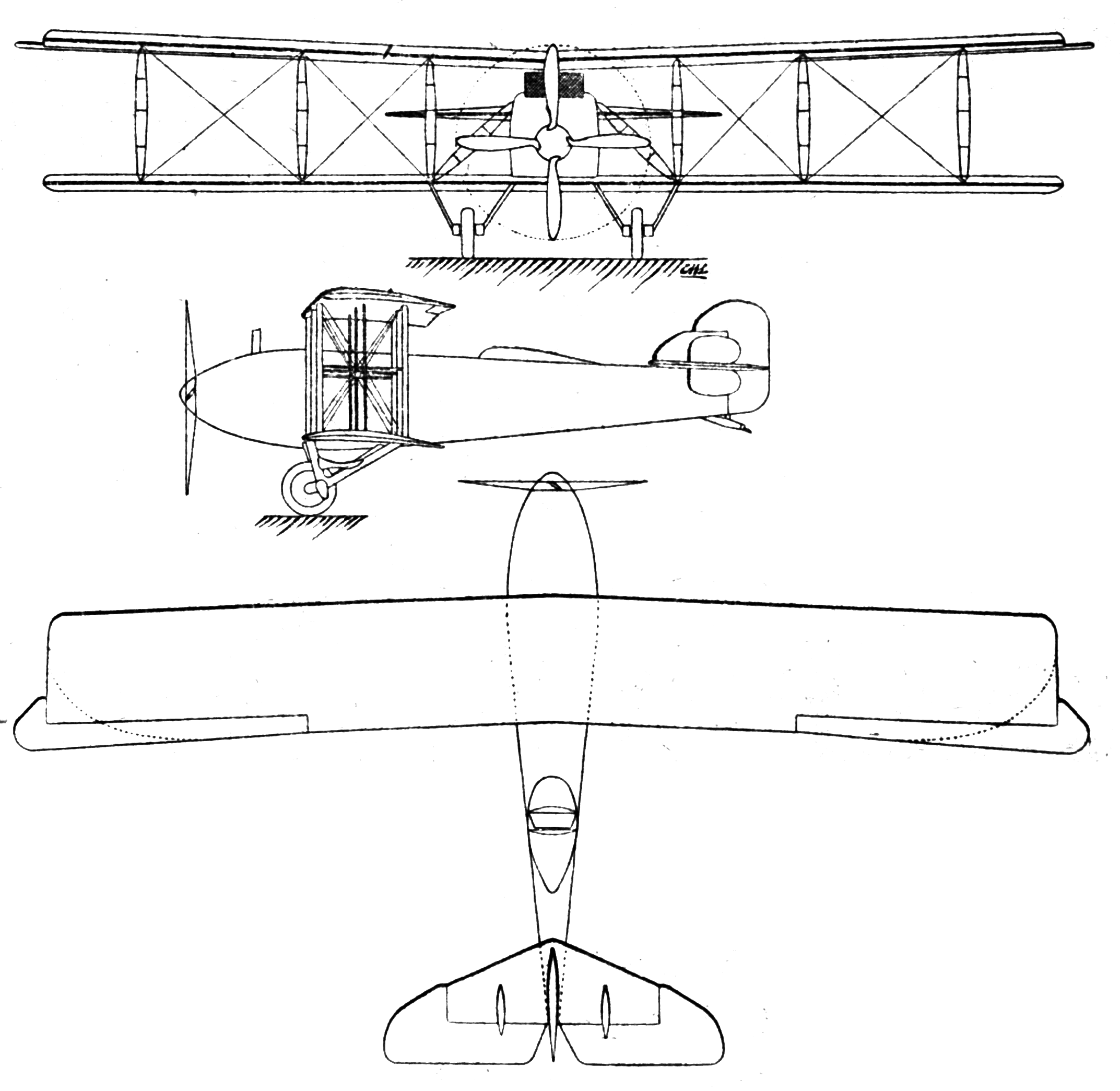
Bréguet XX Leviathan 3-view drawing from Les Ailes November 3, 1921

Data from L'Aérophile 1 January 1923:Les Avions du VIII Salon de l'L'Aéronautique, Flight 28 December 1922:Louis Bréguet - Paris, L'Aérophile 15 December 1922:Les Avions Stand par Stand - Bréguet "Leviathan" XXII, Jane's all the World's Aircraft 1924

General characteristics

- Crew: 2/3
- Capacity: 25 including crew
- Length: 14.016 m (46 ft 0 in)
- Wingspan: 25.538 m (83 ft 9 in)
- Height: 5.135 m (16 ft 10 in)
- Wing area: 140 m^{2} (1,500 sq ft)
- Empty weight: 3,150 kg (6,945 lb)
- Gross weight: 6,400 kg (14,110 lb)
- Fuel capacity: 1,500 L (396 US gal; 330 imp gal)
- Powerplant: 2 × Bréguet-Bugatti U.16 U-16, (two straight-eight engines in parallel), water-cooled in-line piston engines, 360 kW (480 hp) each
- Propellers: 4-bladed fixed pitch propellers

Performance

- Maximum speed: 170 km/h (110 mph, 92 kn) at 2,000 m (6,600 ft)
- Range: 1,100 km (680 mi, 590 nmi)
- Service ceiling: 4,000 m (13,000 ft)
- Wing loading: 46 kg/m^{2} (9.4 lb/sq ft)
- Power/mass: 0.1065 kW/kg (0.0648 hp/lb)
