= Rotax 256 =

Rotax Type 256

Overview
- Manufacturer: Rotax
- Production: 1980–1998

Layout
- Configuration: U2, naturally-aspirated
- Displacement: 250 cc (15 cu in)
- Cylinder bore: 54 mm (2.1 in)
- Piston stroke: 54.4 mm (2.14 in)

Combustion
- Fuel system: fuel injection
- Fuel type: Gasoline
- Oil system: Dry sump
- Cooling system: liquid-cooled

Output
- Power output: 66 kW (89 hp) @ 12,800 rpm

Dimensions
- Dry weight: 297 lb (135 kg)

The Rotax Type 256 is a 250 cc (15 cu in) two-stroke parallel twin-cylinder racing engine, designed, developed and produced by Rotax, between 1980 and 1998. It was primary used in kart (especially kart racing) applications, as well as motorcycle racing applications, such as competing in the 250cc class of the Grand Prix motorcycle World Championship.
