= Inline engine (aeronautics) =

Reciprocating engine arranged with cylinders in banks aligned with the crankshaft

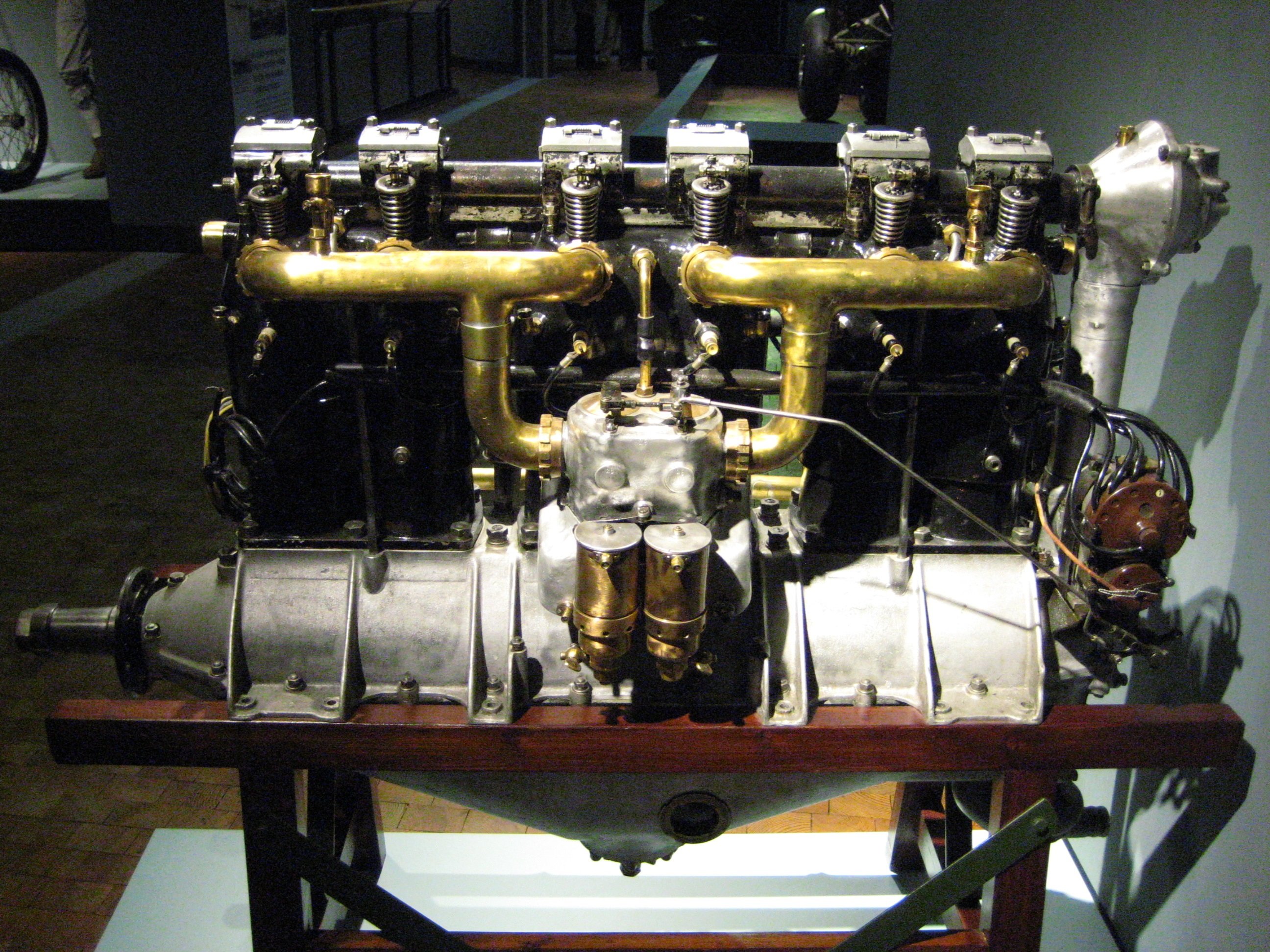
A Mercedes D.II inline engine on display

In aviation, an inline engine is a reciprocating engine with banks of cylinders, one behind another, rather than rows of cylinders, with each bank having any number of cylinders, although more than six is uncommon. The major reciprocating-engine alternative configuration is the radial engine, where the cylinders are placed in a circular or "star" arrangement.

The term "inline" is used somewhat differently for aircraft engines than automotive engines. For automotive engines, the term ‘inline’ refers only to straight engines (those with a single bank of cylinders). But for aircraft, ‘inline’ can also refer to engines which are not of the straight configuration, such as V, H, or horizontally opposed.

== Inline engine configurations ==
Straight
Engines with a single bank of cylinders which can be arranged at any angle but typically upright or inverted, (e.g. upright ADC Cirrus, inverted de Havilland Gipsy Major).

V
Engines with two banks of cylinders with less than 180° between them driving a common crankshaft, typically arranged upright or inverted (e.g. upright Liberty L-12, inverted Argus As 410).

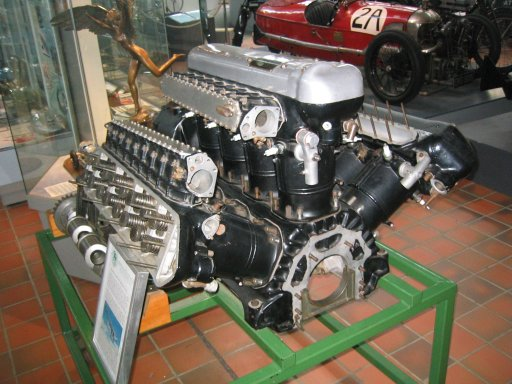
A W-12 Napier Lion engine

O or Horizontally Opposed
Engines with two banks of cylinders arranged at 180° to each other driving a common crankshaft, almost universally mounted with banks horizontal for aircraft use, or with crankshaft vertical for helicopter use, (e.g. horizontally mounted Continental O-190, vertically mounted Franklin 6ACV-245).

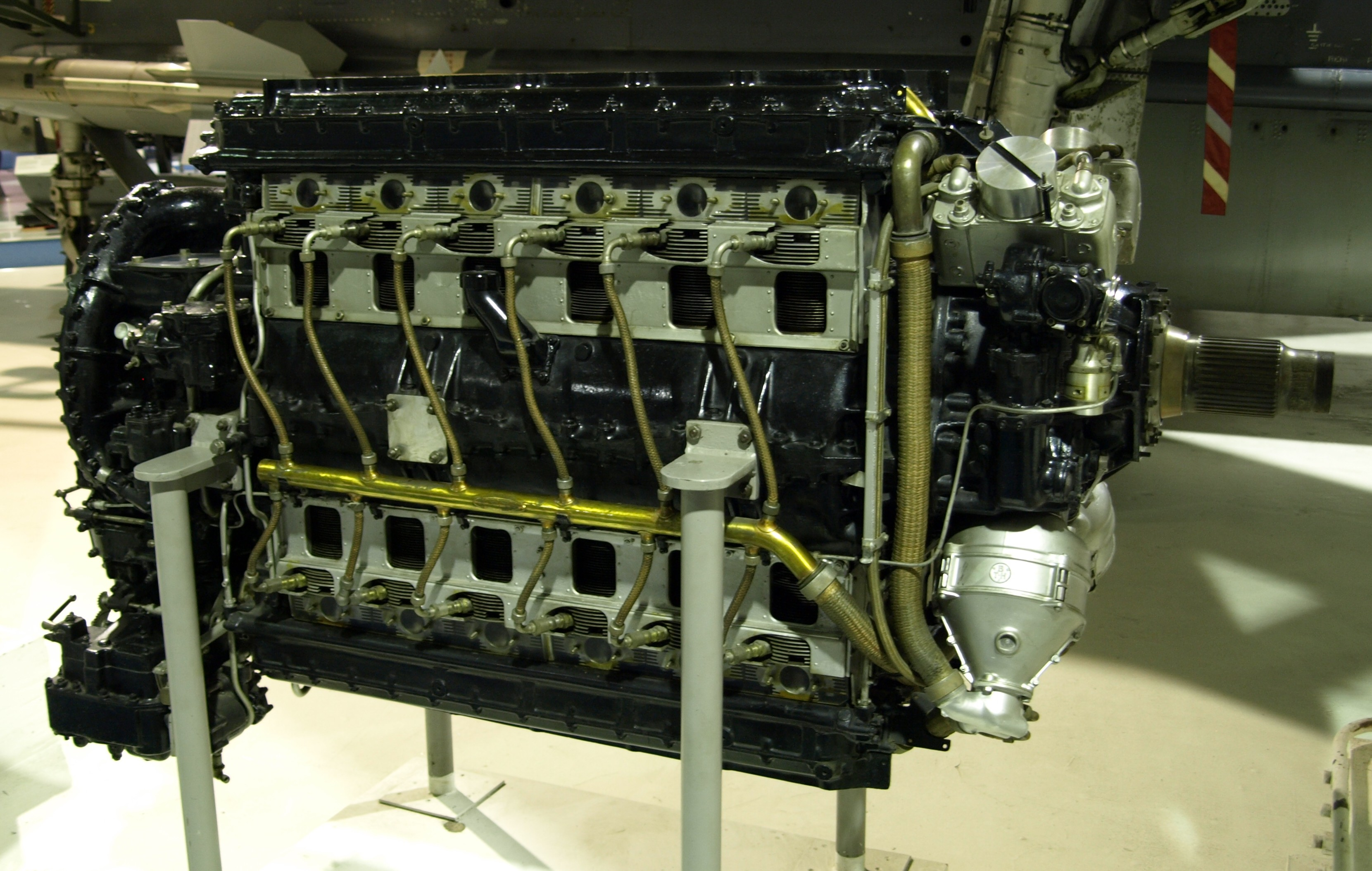
An H-24 Napier Dagger engine on display at the Royal Air Force Museum Hendon.

W
Engines with three banks driving a common crankshaft, arranged so that first and last banks are 180°or less apart, (e.g. upright Lorraine 12Eb, inverted Napier Lioness).
X
Multiple bank engines with four banks arranged around a common crankshaft, usually spaced evenly, (e.g. evenly spaced Rolls-Royce Vulture, unevenly spaced Napier Cub).

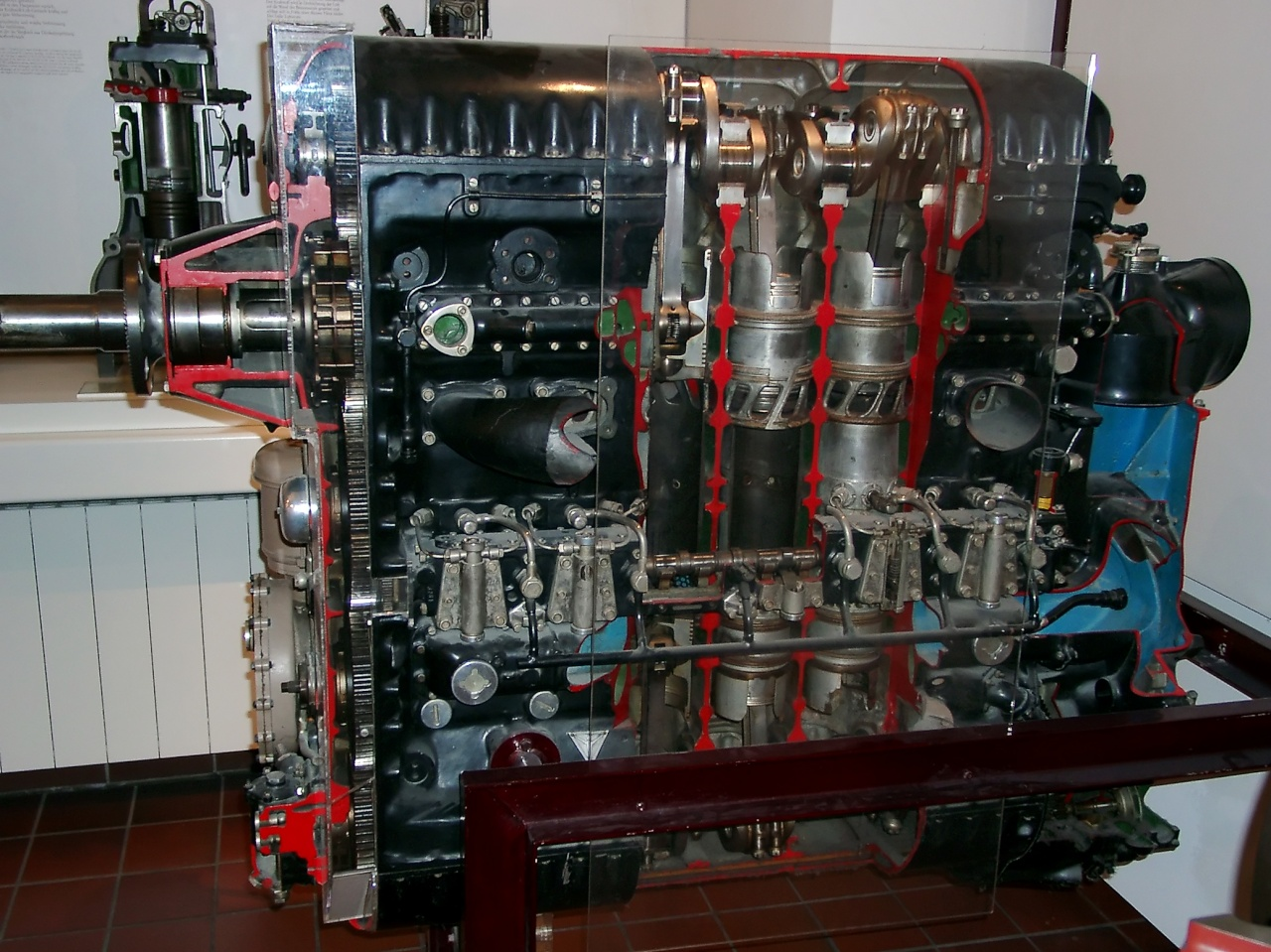
A cutaway Jumo 205 2-stroke opposed piston diesel engine

Fan
Engines with more than three banks with 180° or less between first and last bank, akin to W engines.

Note: Fan engines with single cylinder banks, typically from Anzani, are usually regarded as variants of the Radial engine.

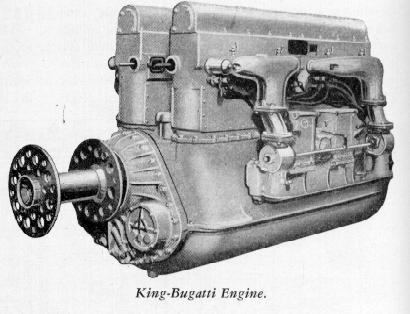
A Bugatti U-16 engine

U
Engines with two banks of cylinders side by side driving separate crankshafts geared to a single output, (e.g. Bugatti U-16).

H
Engines with four banks of cylinders driving two crankshafts geared to a single output, in effect, two Opposed engines coupled together and mounted either horizontally or vertically, (e.g. horizontally Napier Sabre, vertically Napier Dagger).

Opposed piston
Two-stroke engines, typically compression ignition/Diesel, with a single bank of cylinders driving two crankshafts where the pistons travel towards each other forming single combustion chambers, (e.g. Jumo 207).

Deltic: Engines with three banks of opposed piston cylinders arranged in a triangle with three crankshafts geared to drive a single output,(e.g. Napier Deltic)

Rhomboidal: Engines with four or more banks of opposed piston cylinders arranged in a square with four crankshafts geared to drive a single output,(e.g. Jumo 223)

Note: There is no theoretical limit to the number banks in an opposed piston engine, limitations include cost, complexity and reliability.

Multiple bank
Engines with more than two banks, arranged around a common axis and/or crankshaft with more than 180° between first and last banks.

Star: Multiple bank engines with an even number of banks (more than four) arranged around a common axis and/or driving a common crankshaft with more than 180° between first and last banks, (e.g. Jumo 222, Dobrynin VD-4K).

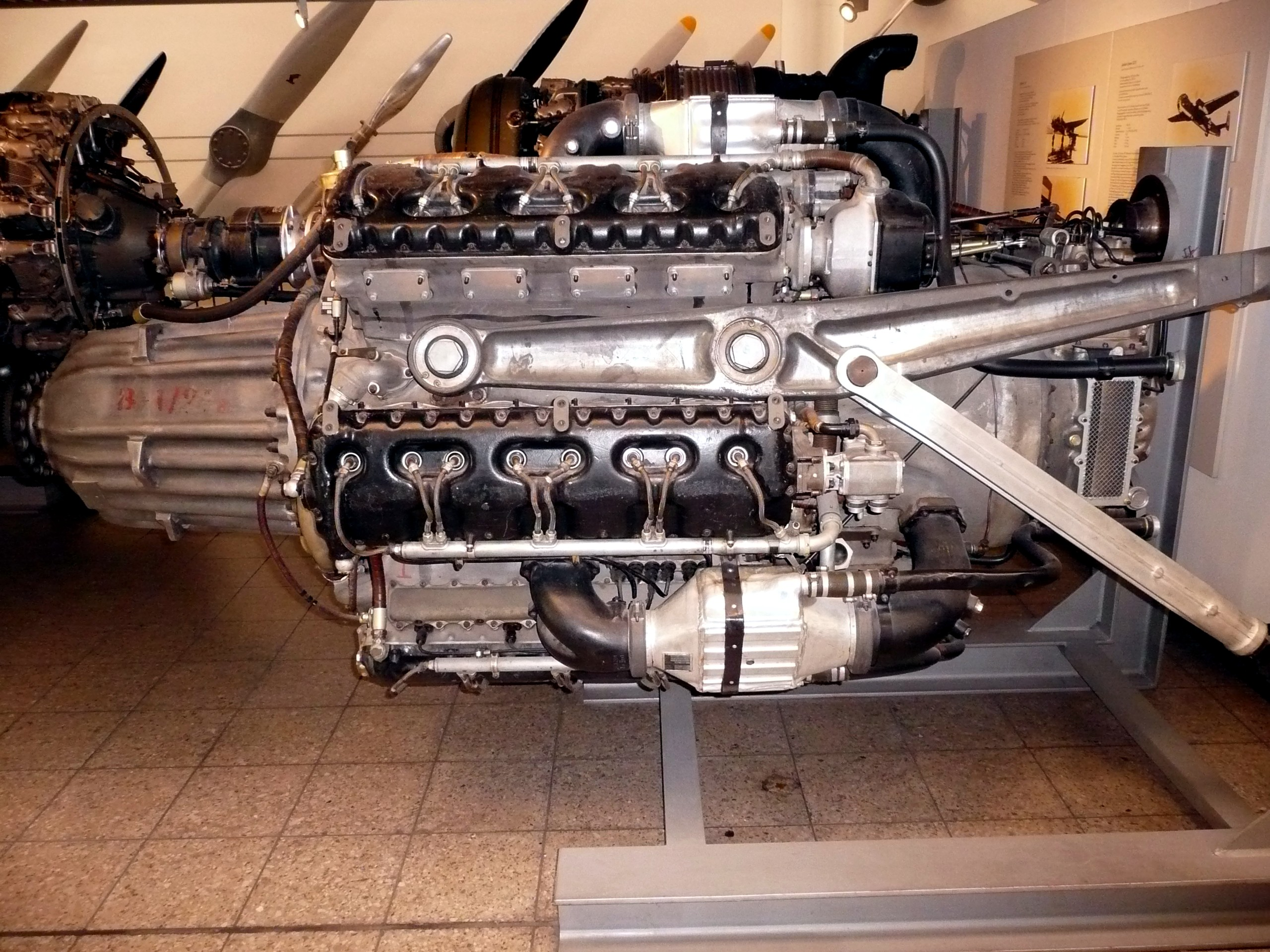
A Junkers Jumo 222 multibank aviation engine, four cylinders per bank.

Inline Radial: Multiple bank engines, usually liquid-cooled, with an odd number of banks (three or more) arranged around a common axis and/or driving a common crankshaft with more than 180° between first and last banks, (e.g. air-cooled Armstrong Siddeley Deerhound, liquid-cooled BMW 803).

Note The BMW 803 is not only an inline radial engine but is also a coupled engine with two engines arranged back to back on a common axis driving separate co-axial propellers through a common gearbox.

== Inverted engine ==
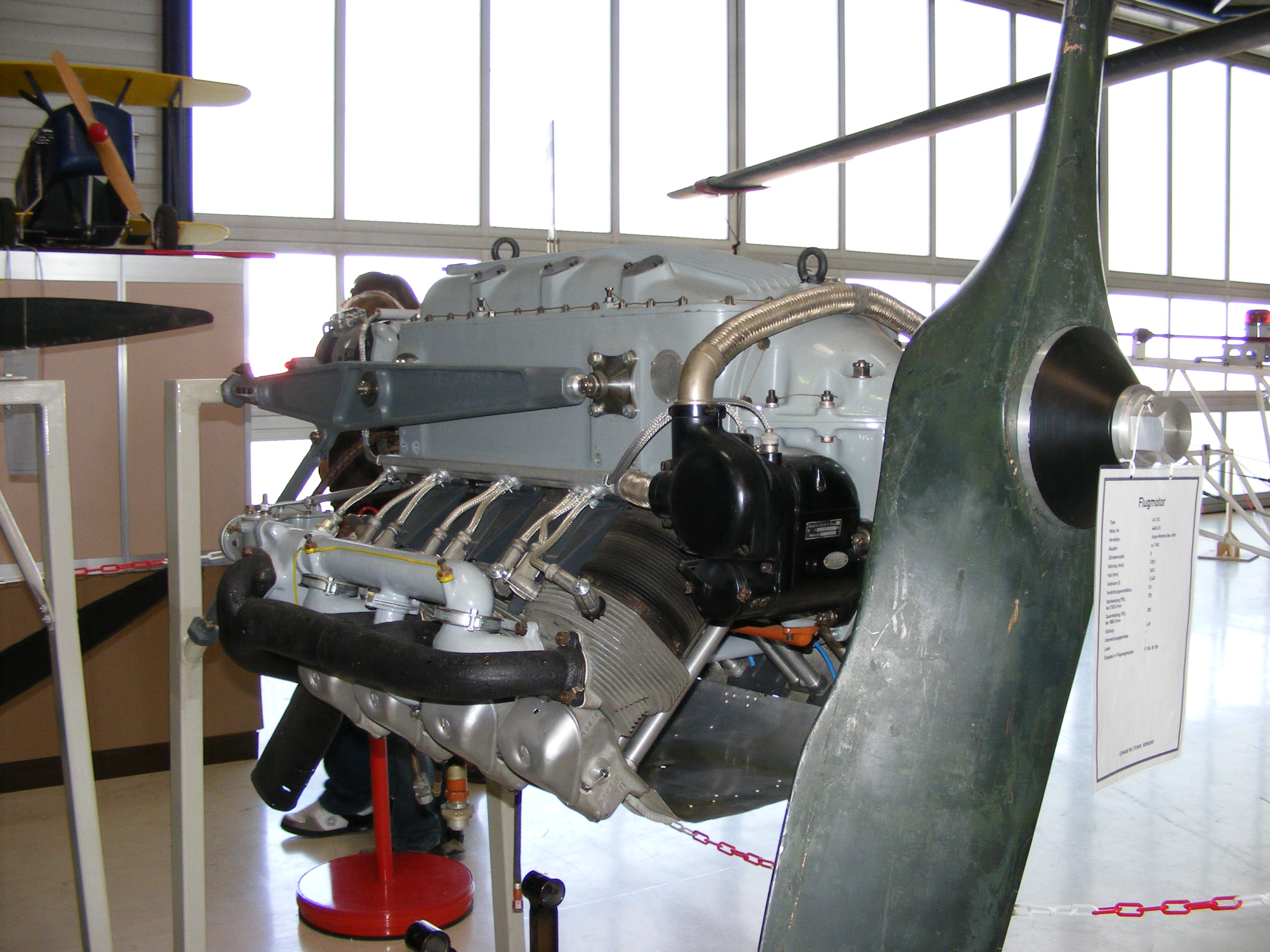
Argus As 10 inverted air-cooled V8 engine

An upright engine has the cylinder heads directly above the crankshaft. By contrast an inverted engine has the cylinder heads directly beneath it. In the inverted V layout, the cylinders angle downwards instead of upwards.

For an aero engine, advantages of the inverted layout include improved access to cylinder heads and manifolds for the ground crew, having the centre of mass of a multi-bank engine lower in the engine and, for engines mounted in the nose, improved visibility for the pilot and placing the widest part of a multi-bank engine closer to the midline of the fuselage, which is typically its widest point.

The Hirth HM 60 four-cylinder inverted inline engine was introduced in 1924, and inverted designs saw increasing popularity through the late 1920s and 30s. Widespread examples included the inline de Havilland Gipsy Major used in the de Havilland Tiger Moth, and the inverted-V Daimler-Benz DB 601 used in the Messerschmitt Bf 109.
