= V engine =

Internal combustion engine with two banks of cylinders at an angle resembling a 'V'

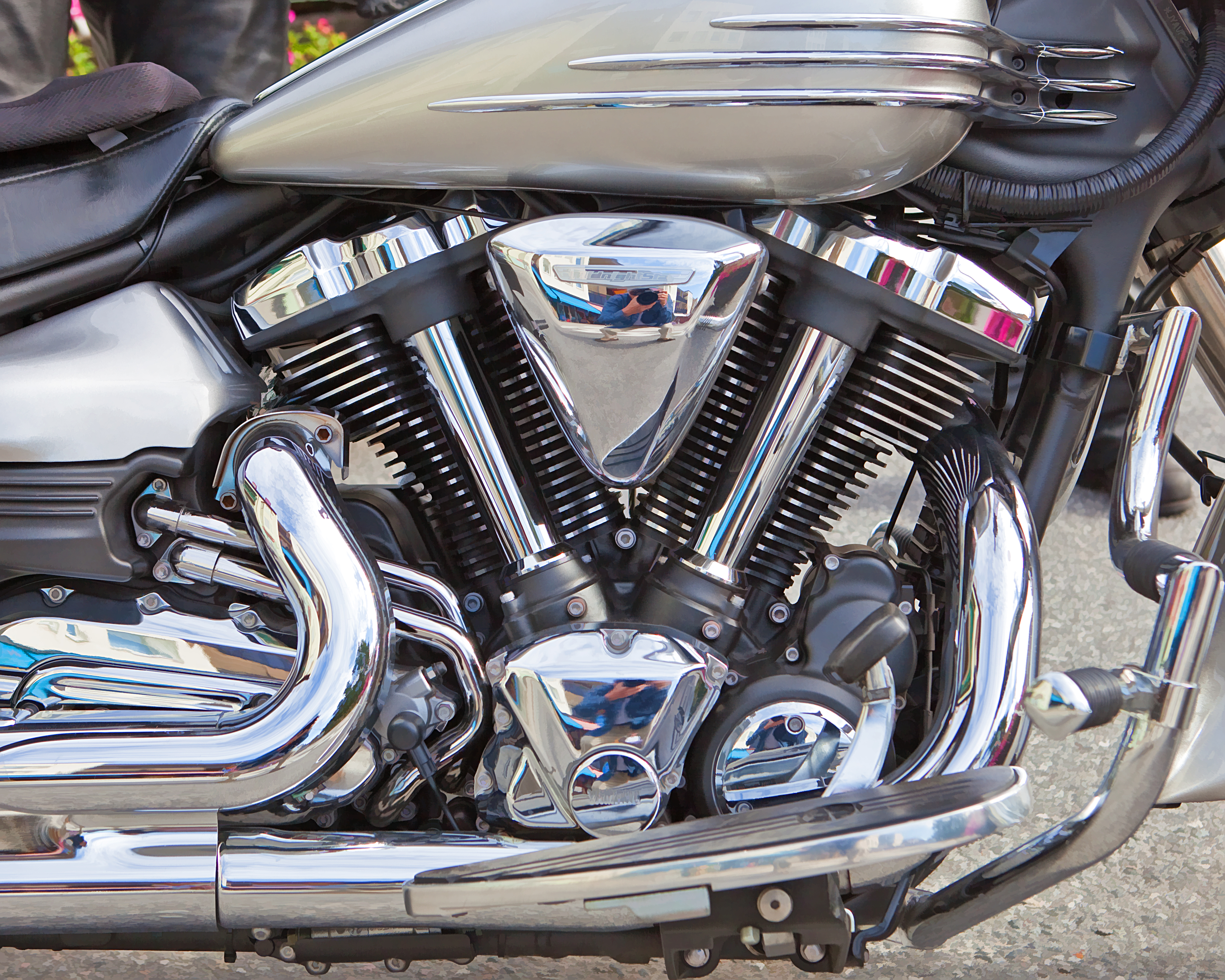
V-twin motorcycle engine (circa 2006)

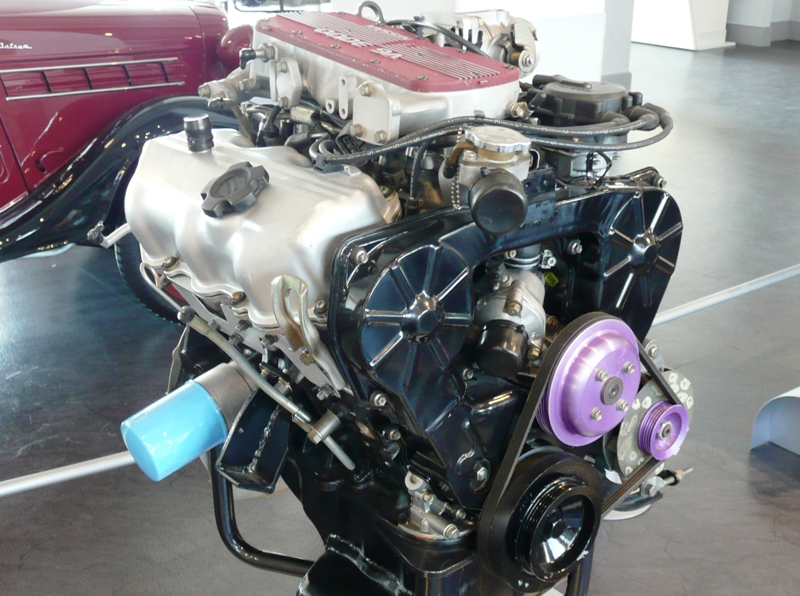
V6 car engine (circa 1990)

A V engine, sometimes called a Vee engine, is a common configuration for internal combustion engines. It consists of two cylinder banks—usually with the same number of cylinders in each bank—connected to a common crankshaft. These cylinder banks are arranged at an angle to each other, so that the banks form a "V" shape when viewed from the front of the engine.

V engines typically have a shorter length than equivalent inline engines, however the trade-off is a larger width. V6, V8 and V12 engines are the most common layout for automobile engines with 6, 8 or 12 cylinders respectively.

== History ==
The first V engine, a two-cylinder V-twin, was designed by Wilhelm Maybach and used in the 1889 Daimler Stahlradwagen automobile.

The first V8 engine was produced in 1903, in the form of the Antoinette engine designed by Léon Levavasseur for racing boats and airplanes. The first V12 engine was produced the following year by Putney Motor Works in London, again for use in racing boats. The first V6 engine to reach production appeared soon after in 1908, by the Deutz Gasmotoren Fabrik in Germany for use as a generator for gasoline-electric railway engines. However, it was not until 1950 that the V6 engine was used in series production automobiles, with the first example being the Lancia V6 engine. This V6 engine used a 60-degree V angle and separate crankpins for each cylinder, to reduce the vibration issues experienced by earlier attempts at production V6 engines.

== Characteristics ==
Compared with an equivalent inline engine (the most common configuration for engines with less than six cylinders), a V engine has a shorter length but is wider. This effect increases with the number of cylinders in the engine; the length difference between V-twin and straight-twin engines might be insignificant, however V8 engines have a significantly smaller length than straight engines. Compared with the less common flat engine, a V engine is narrower, taller and has a higher center of mass.

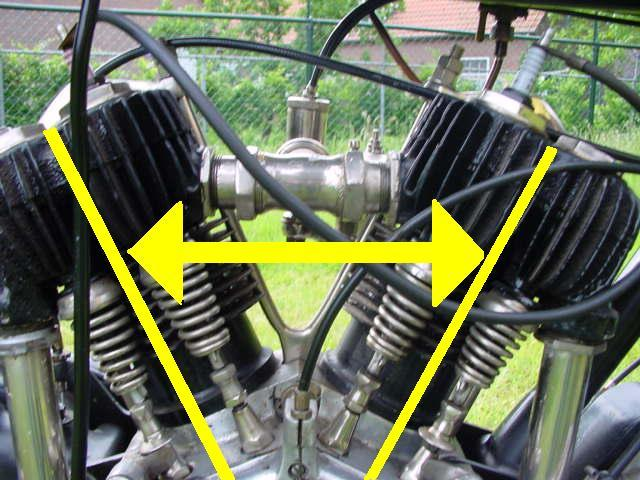
V-angle illustrated by the yellow lines

The "V-angle" (or "included angle") between the cylinder banks varies significantly between engines. Some engines have used a V-angle of 180 degrees (the same angle as a flat engine), such as several Ferrari V12 engines. At the other end of the scale, the 1922–1976 Lancia V4 engine and the 1991–present Volkswagen VR6 engine use V-angles as small as 10 degrees, along with a single cylinder head used by both banks of cylinders.

The engine balance of a V12 engine is that of perfect primary and secondary balance. For V engines with fewer cylinders, the engine balance will depend on factors such as the firing interval, crankshaft counterweights and whether balance shafts are present.

The crankpins on a V engine are usually shared by two cylinders from opposing banks, with an offset between the two cylinders. Alternative configurations are separate crankpins per cylinder (such as several V-twin engines) or articulated connecting rods.

=== Inverted engines ===
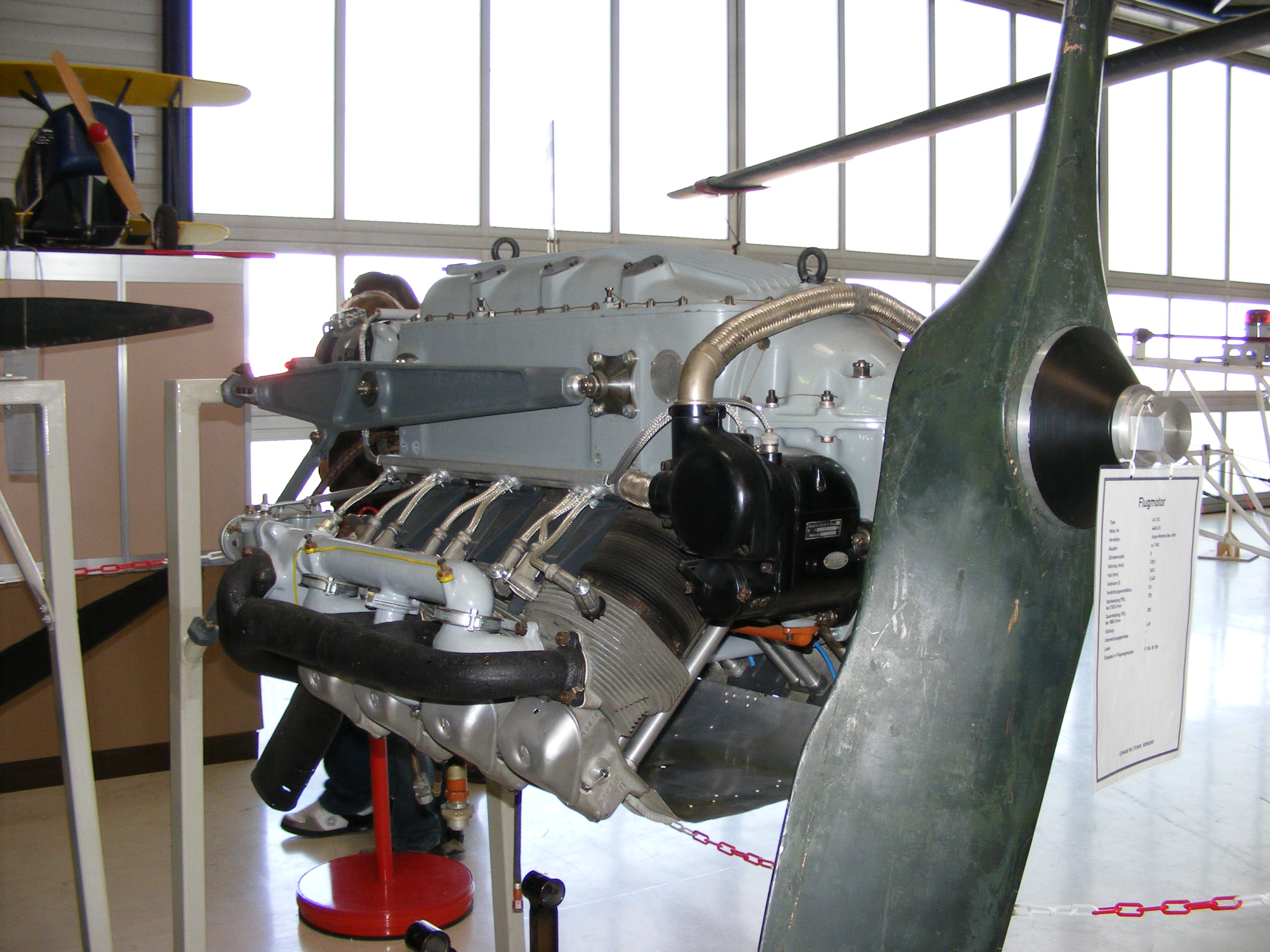
Argus As 10 inverted engine

Some airplanes of the 1920s and 1930s used inverted engines, whereby the crankshaft is located at the top of the engine and the cylinder heads are at the bottom. Advantages include better visibility in a single-engined airplane, a higher thrust line, and resultant increased ground clearance for the propeller. Examples include the 1928 Argus As 10 V8 engine and the 1935 Daimler-Benz DB 601 V12 engines.

== Specific configurations ==
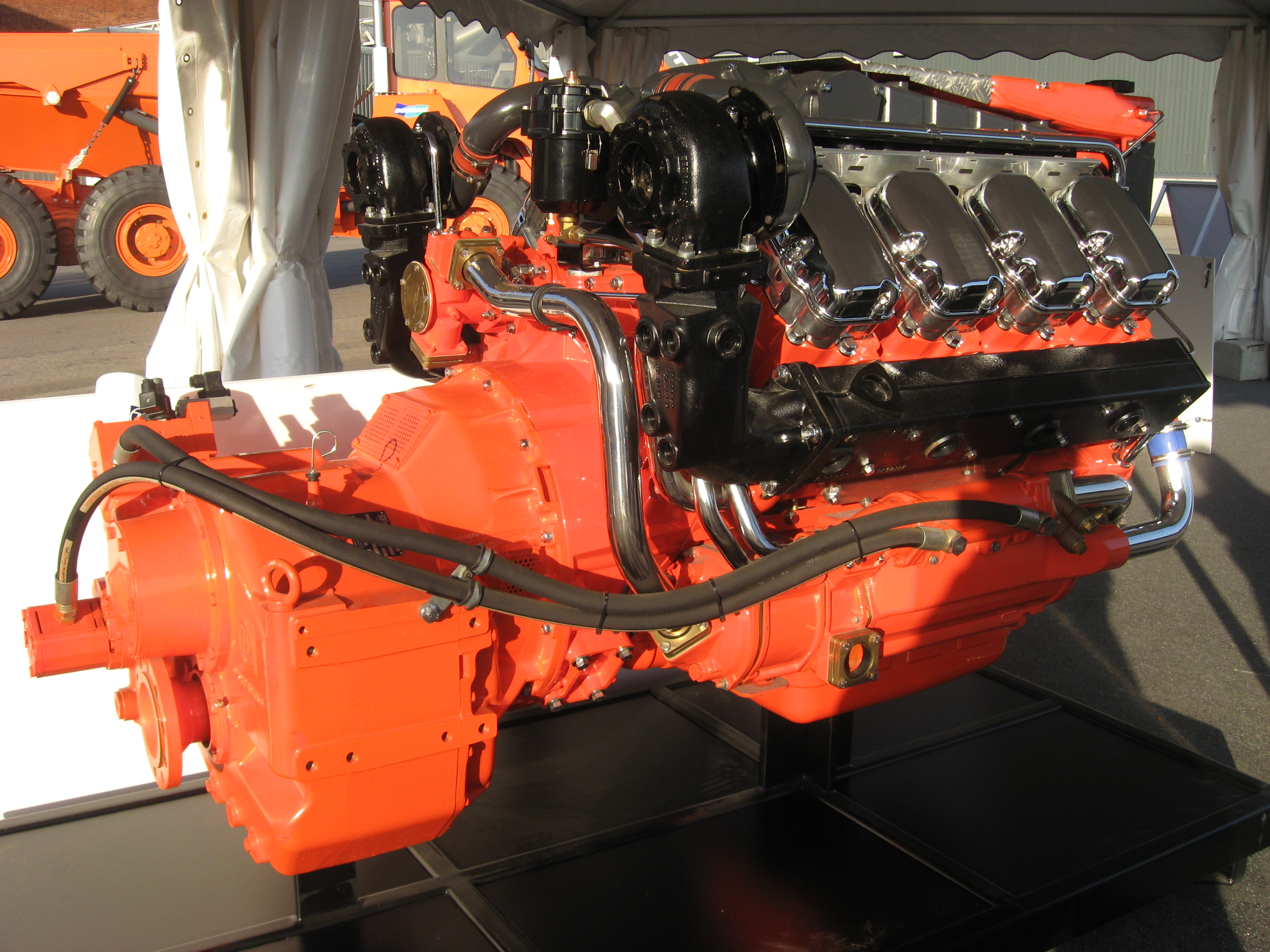
V8 truck engine

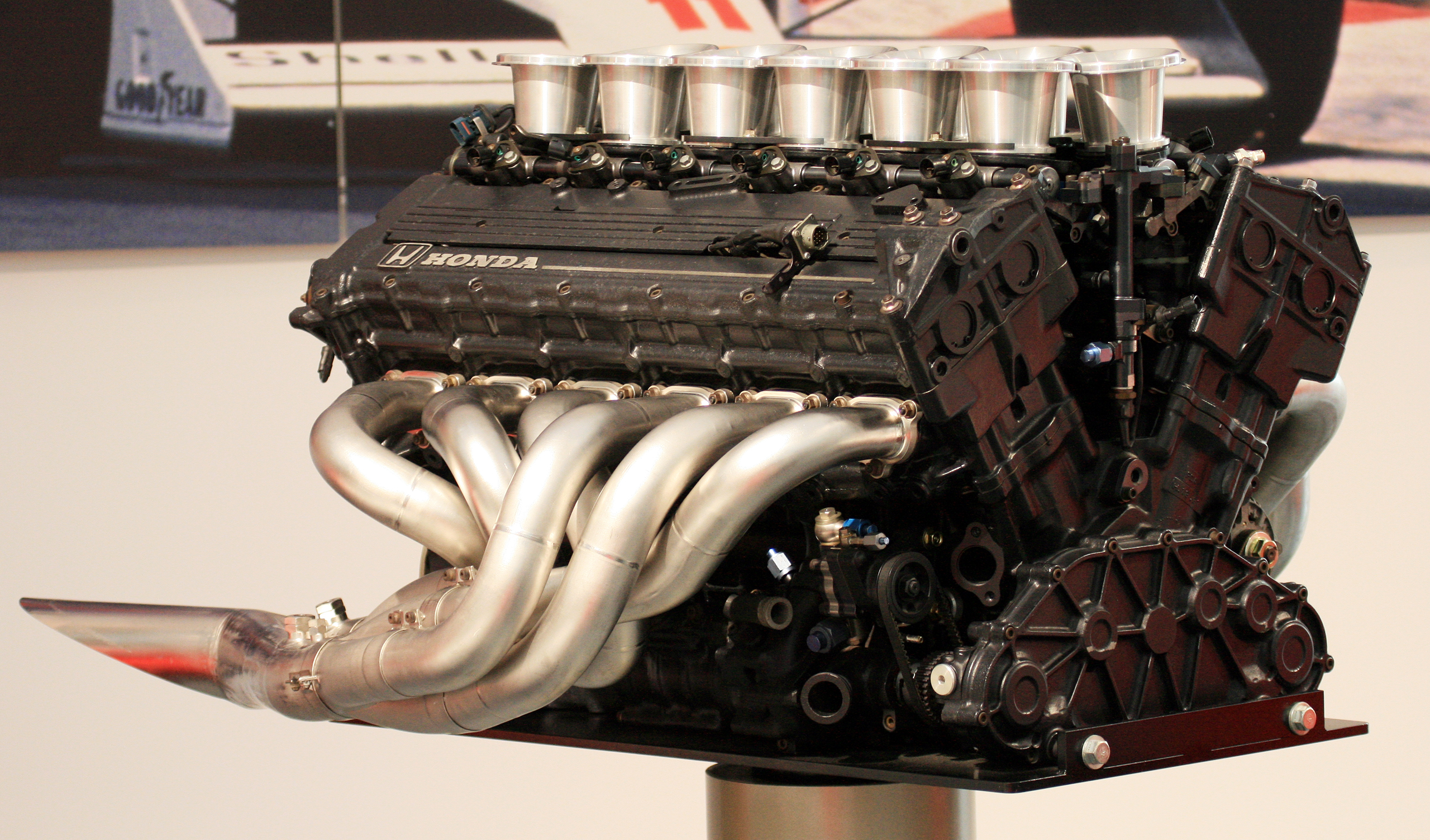
V12 Formula One engine from 1991

It is common practice for V engines to be described with "V#" notation, where # represents the number of cylinders. Configurations of V engines which have reached production are as follows:

- V-twin (also known as "V2")
- V3
- V4
- V5
- V6
- V8
- V10
- V12
- V14
- V16
- V18
- V20
- V24
- V32

== See also ==
- Straight engine
- Flat engine
- Radial engine
- U engine
- H engine
- W engine
- X engine
- Media related to V engines at Wikimedia Commons
