= U engine =

Piston engine design

Animation of a U engine

A U engine is a piston engine made up of two separate straight engines (complete with separate crankshafts) placed side-by-side and coupled to a shared output shaft. When viewed from the front, the engine block resembles the letter "U".

Although much less common than the similar V engine design, several U engines were produced from 1915 to 1989 for use in airplanes, racing cars, racing and road motorcycles, locomotives, and tanks.

== Design ==
The main benefit of a U engine layout is the ability to share common parts with a straight engine upon which is it based. Additionally, if the two crankshafts rotate in opposite directions, the gyroscopic effect of the rotating components in each cylinder bank cancel each other out.

A V engine is typically more compact and lighter than a U engine, in part due to the lack of a second crankshaft, making V engines far more common than U engines. However, the V engine does not cancel the gyroscopic effect.

The H engine layout uses a similar concept to U engines, whereby two flat engines are stacked vertically.

== History ==
=== Petrol engines ===
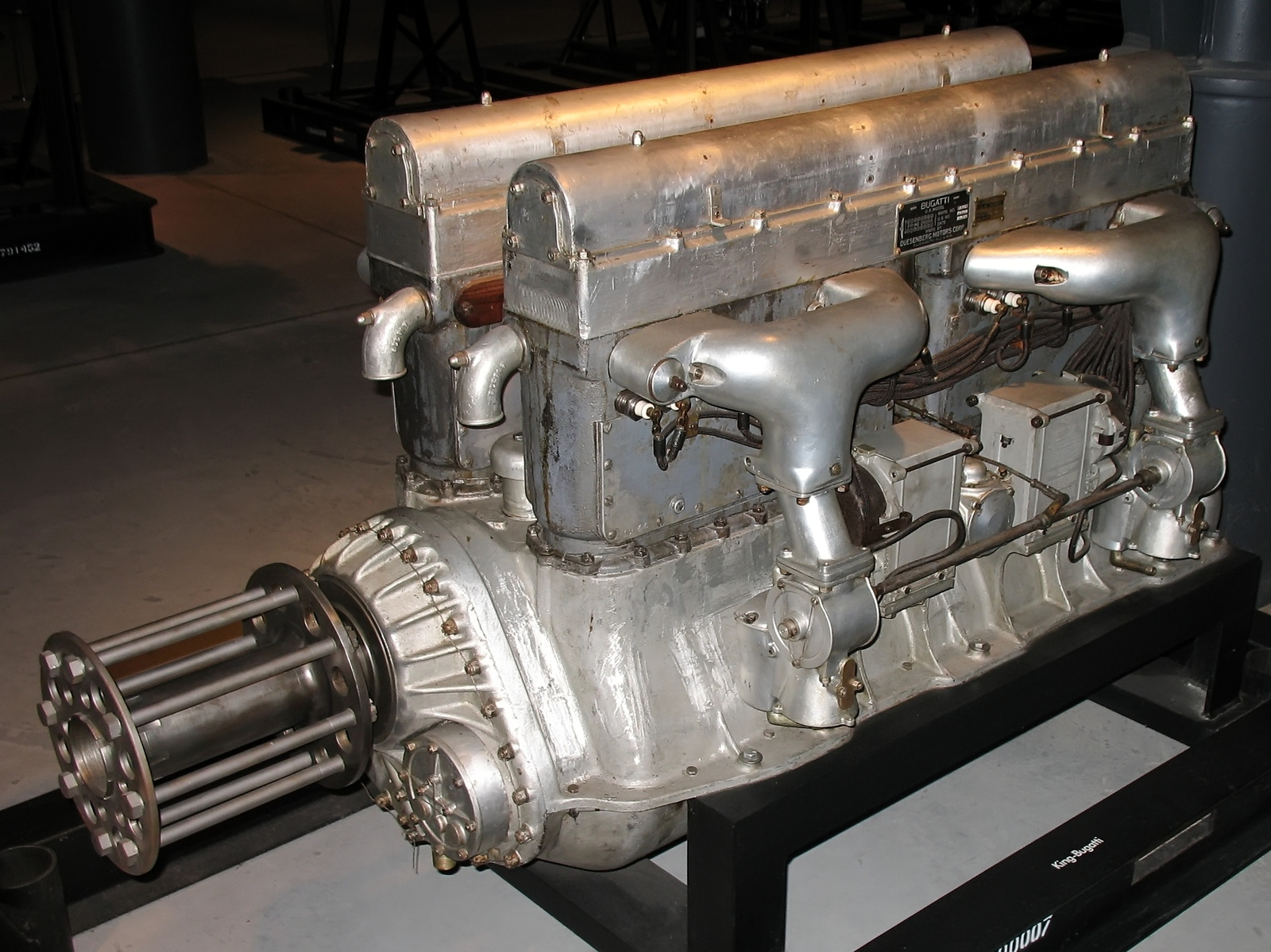
1915–1916 Bugatti U-16 aircraft engine

The first U engine known to have been built was the 1915–1916 Bugatti U-16 aircraft engine, which had 16 cylinders and a displacement of 24.3 L (1,483 cu in). Approximately 40 engines were built at the Duesenberg factory in the United States during World War I. A small number of engines based on the Bugatti U engine were also produced after the war by Breguet Aviation in France.

The Fiat 806 was a 1927 Grand Prix racing car that was powered by a 1.5 L (92 cu in) twelve-cylinder U engine. This engine, designated the 'Type 406', used a supercharger and had a single centrally mounted intake camshaft which operated the intake valves located on the inside of each cylinder bank. Two separate camshafts operated the exhaust valves (one per bank). On test the unit delivered 187 bhp at 8,500 rpm at maximum boost. The Fiat 806 car competed in only one race, the 50 km (31 mi) Milan Grand Prix on 4 September 1927 (not to be confused with the 500 km 1927 Italian Grand Prix held on the same day). The race was won by the Fiat 806; however, Fiat then retired from Grand Prix racing and the Type 806 did not race again.

The 1931–1959 Ariel Square Four motorcycle used a four-cylinder engine (also called a 'square four' engine). The engine was compact and had as narrow a frontal area as a 500 cc, parallel twin. The rear pair of cylinders on this air-cooled engine were prone to overheating.

The 1985–1989 Suzuki RG500 motorcycle, developed from the Suzuki RG 500 gamma racing motorcycles, used a water-cooled, four-cylinder, two-stroke U engine. The racing machines were successful, but the road legal version was dropped from production in 1989.

=== Diesel ===
In the 1930s Sulzer Brothers Ltd. began production of an 'LD series' twelve-cylinder U engine for use in rail locomotives. The LD series was replaced by the LDA series, for a combined production period of over 50 years. The Sulzer 12LDA twin-bank engine formed the mainstay of British locomotives built in the 1960s, with over 700 used in the Peak and Class 47 locomotives. The Sulzer LDA engine used a smaller gear for the central output shaft than the two gears attached to the crankshaft. This resulted in the output shaft rotating at approximately 1000 rpm while the crankshafts rotated at approximately 750 rpm. The purpose of this gearing was to allow the use of a smaller, and lighter, electrical generator when the engine was used in a diesel-electric locomotive.

The General Motors 6046 is a twin-engine setup that was used by Sherman tanks during World War II. The 6046 was built using two straight-six engines that were separately clutched to a single output shaft, which was itself clutched to the transmission unit. A total of 10,968 6046D-powered M4A2 Shermans were produced. After World War II, the Soviet Union produced several tanks powered by 16-cylinder and 18-cylinder engines that were reverse-engineered from the General Motors 6046 engine. These Soviet engines were designated Russkiy Dizel (Diesel Energo) DPN23/2H30 and the DRPN23/2H30.

== Variations ==
=== Tandem twin engine ===
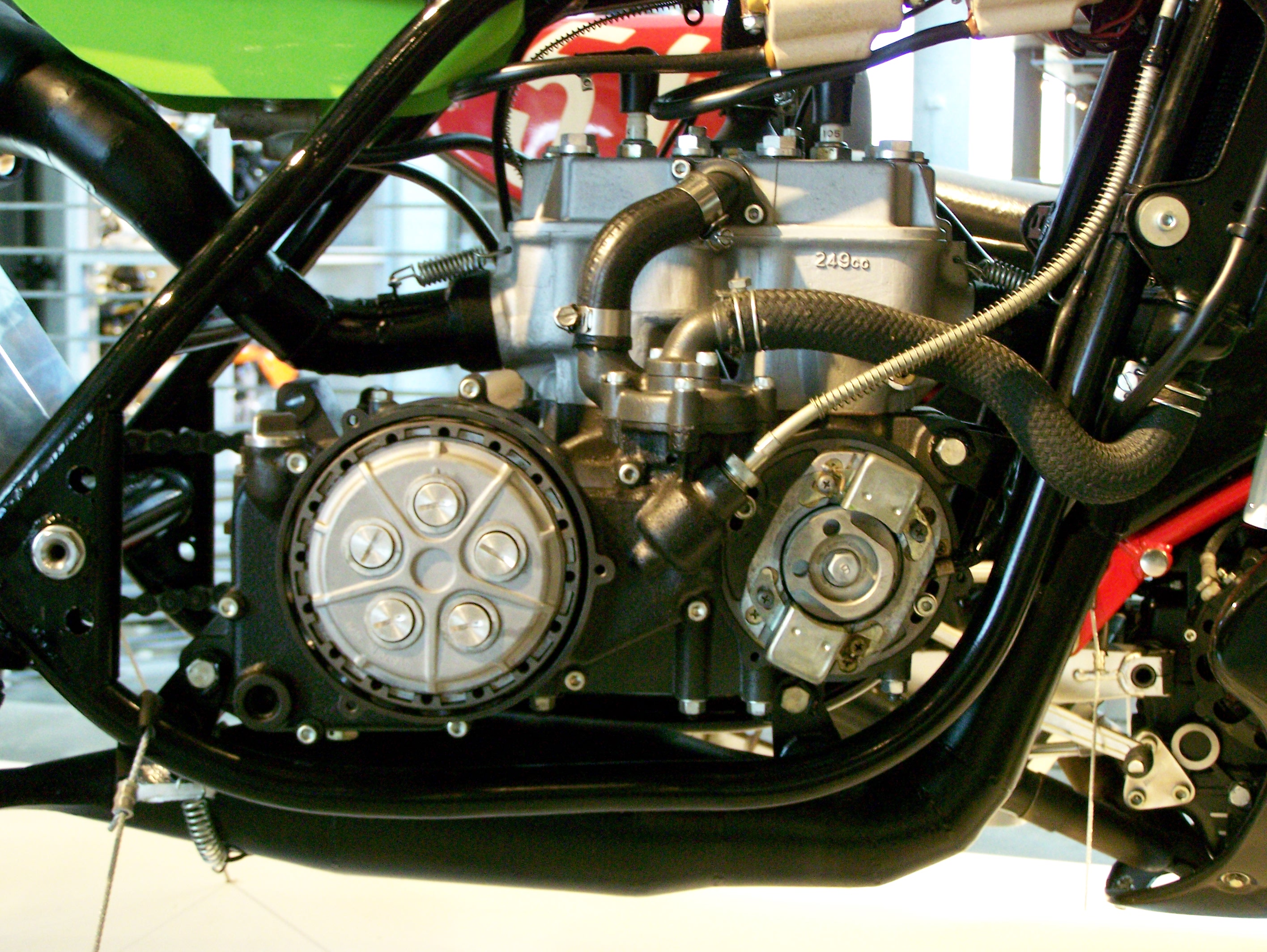
A tandem inline-twin

A tandem twin engine, occasionally used in motorcycles and go-karts, is a two-cylinder engine which uses a similar design to U engines. The motor has two crankshafts, one for each cylinder which are joined and kept in co-ordination by load carrying, crank-phasing gears connecting the two cylinders.

The tandem twin layout is used only with two-stroke engines since these must have a discrete crankcase chamber per cylinder. The prime advantage of a tandem-twin two-stroke is that the engine can be very narrow while allowing chain final drive without a power-wasting 90° turn.

Between 1975 and 1982, Kawasaki used the design to win four 250 cc and four 350 cc world championships before they retired from Grand Prix racing. The engine design was also used for a road legal production motorcycle inspired by the racer. The Kawasaki KR models were instrumental in establishing the company as a manufacturer of high-performance motorcycles.

Rotax developed a similar tandem twin design, the model 256, which it sold to independent constructors. The CCM Armstrong 250 cc, Waddon, EMC, Hejira, Decorite, and Cotton racers used this engine. CCM Armstrong developed a 350 cc version of the engine. Aprilia's 1985 GP racing bikes also used the Rotax model 256.

=== Single crankshaft ===
An unusual variation on the U engine is the use of a single crankshaft which is linked to the pistons in both cylinder banks by rocking beams. This system was used in an eight-cylinder petrol engine produced by the All-British Car Company between 1906 and 1908.

=== Odd number of cylinders ===
At the 2025 EICMA show, MV Agusta presented the prototype of a five-cylinder engine in an U configuration called "Cinque Cilindri." Initial press reports referred to it as a VR engine, while others already called it an U engine. After MV Agusta itself published the first technical datas, it became clear that it is an U engine. MV Agusta has announced, that upcoming models with this engine will complement the current model lineup rather than replacing any model in it. The engine is scheduled to go into series production in the next few years. When the engine goes into series production, the Italian manufacturer will achieve two firsts in engine construction: This engine will be the first U engine with an odd number of cylinders ever and also the first five-cylinder engine in the serial production of motorcycles.

== See also ==
- Split-single engine
- List of motorcycles by type of engine
