= BBT =

BBT may refer to:

== Arts and entertainment ==
- The Big Bang Theory, an American sitcom
- "The Big Bang Theory" (Family Guy), an episode of Family Guy
- Big Biz Tycoon, a business simulation game by Animedia
- Bujinkan Budō Taijutsu, the group which teaches the Bujinkan
- Black box theater, a simple performance space, typically a square room with black walls and a flat floor.

=== Music ===
- Big Bang Theory (Harem Scarem album), a 1998 album by the Canadian hard rock band Harem Scarem
- Big Bang Theory (Styx album), an album by Styx
- Big Big Train, an English progressive rock band that was founded in 1990

== Organisations ==
- Air Bashkortostan (ICAO code BBT), an airline based in Russia
- Barbier, Benard, et Turenne, a French company that specialized in the manufacture of lighthouse lenses
- Bhaktivedanta Book Trust, the world's largest publisher of books concerning Krishna
- Barclays Bank Tanzania, a commercial bank in Tanzania
- Borletti-Buitoni Trust, a charitable trust established in 2002 to help young musicians throughout the world
- Toyama Television, a television station in Toyama Prefecture, Japan
- Brighton Ballet Theater, a not-for-profit professional dance school

== Transport ==
- BBT, the Indian Railways station code for Birati railway station, West Bengal, India
- BBT, the MRT station abbreviation for Bukit Batok MRT station, Singapore
- Brooklyn–Battery Tunnel

== Other uses ==
- Basal body temperature, the lowest temperature attained by the body during rest
- Bubble tea, a Taiwanese beverage usually containing a tea base mixed with fruit (or fruit syrup) and/or milk
- Brenner Base Tunnel, a planned long railway tunnel through the base of the Brenner massif

== See also ==
- Big Bang (Big Bang theory), the prevailing cosmological model for the universe
- Big Bang (disambiguation)
- Big Bang Theory (disambiguation)
