= Big-bang firing order =

Petrol engine with an uneven firing order

A big bang engine has an unconventional firing order designed so that some of the power strokes occur simultaneously or in close succession. This is achieved by changing the ignition timing, changing or re-timing the camshaft, and sometimes in combination with a change in crankpin angle. The goal is to change the power delivery characteristics of the engine. A regular-firing multi-cylinder engine fires at approximately even intervals, giving a smooth-running engine. Because a big-bang engine has uneven power delivery, it tends to run rougher and generates more vibration than an even-firing engine.

An early big bang application and possibly the source of its discovery is reputed to be American west coast desert racing off-road and also flat track racing motorcycles in the 1960s, where it was thought that large-capacity single-cylinder engine bikes had better traction compared to twin-cylinder engined bikes with similar power, hence 360-degree crankshaft twins were reconfigured to fire both cylinders at the same time, giving the same power impulse interval as a single.

== Twin-cylinder engines ==
Engine	Crankshaft	Ignition timing	Graphical	Example
Four stroke [1] Parallel twin [2] Flat twin [3] 57° V-twin (measured bank angle) [4] 120°	[1] 360° [2] 180° [3] 57° [4] 120°	360-360	1-0-0-0-1-0-0-0-	[1] Kawasaki W800, Kawasaki W650, BMW F800S etc. [2] BMW R series, Honda CB450 [3] 1915 Iver Johnson 15-7 [4] 1933-1951 Moto Guzzi 500 Bicilindrica
[1] Parallel twingle [2] Flat twingle	[1] 360° [2] 180°	720	2-0-0-0-0-0-0-0-	
Four stroke Inline twin	180°	180-540	1-0-1-0-0-0-0-0-	1966 Honda “Black Bomber”, Yamaha TX500, Honda CB500 Twin and Kawasaki ER-6
Four stroke [1] Inline twin [2] 90° V-twin [3] 45° V-twin [4] 60° V-twin	[1] 270° [2] 360° [3] 45° [4] 30°	270-450	1-0-0-1-0-0-0-0-	[1] Yamaha TRX850, Triumph's Scrambler, 2009-on Thunderbird and 2016-on Bonneville family, Yamaha MT-07, 2015- Honda Africa Twin, Aprilia RS660 [2] Ducati, Moto Guzzi, Suzuki SV650, Honda VTR1000, Mazda R360 [3] Suzuki VX 800 Type VS 51 A (US model) [4] 2021- Harley-Davidson RH1250S Sportster & 2022- Harley-Davidson RH975 Nightster
Four stroke [1] Inline twin [2] 75° V-Twin	[1] 285° [2] 360°	285-435	1-0-0-1-0-0-0-0-	[1] KTM 790 Duke [2] KTM 1290 Super Duke R
Four stroke 52° V-twin	360°	308-412	1-0-0-1-0-0-0-0-	Honda Shadow
Four stroke 60° V-twin	360°	300-420	1-0-0-1-0-0-0-0-	Aprilia
Four stroke [1] Inline twin [2] 45° V-twin	[1] 315° [2] 360°	315-405	1-0-0-0-1-0-0-0-	[1] Husqvarna Nuda 900R [2] Most Harley-Davidson models
45° V-twingle	360°	45-675	1-1-0-0-0-0-0-0-	Modified Harley-Davidson XR-750 for flat track racing
Four stroke [1] 45° V-twin [2] Inline-Twin	[1] 90° [2]135°	225°-495°	1-0-1-0-0-0-	[1] Honda PC 800 Pacific Coast, Honda XLV 750 R [2] BMW F 450 GS
Four stroke 52° V-Twin	76°	232-488	1-0-1-0-0-0-0-0-	Honda NTV 650, Honda NT 650 Hawk, Honda Transalp (until 2012), Honda Africa Twin (until 2003) etc.
Four stroke 54° V-twin	72°	234-486	1-0-1-0-0-0-0-0-	Suzuki Boulevard M109R etc.
Four stroke [1] 45° V-Twin [2] 120° V-twin	[1] 75° [2] 0°	240-480	1-0-1-0-0-0-0-0-	[1] Suzuki VX 800 Type VS 51 A (worldwide except for the USA)[2] Paul Härri's 1994 Moto Guzzi 500 Bicilindrica replica with a displacement of 250 cc

=== Parallel twins ===
In a parallel twin, both pistons reach top dead center at the same time. In a parallel twin where the pistons move up and down at the same time, the crankshaft angle is 360 degrees.

The classic British parallel-twins (BSA, Triumph, Norton, AJS & Matchless) all had 360° crankshafts that, compared to a single, gave twice as many power/torque impulses for a given amount of crankshaft rotation, these impulses are equally spaced to give an equal firing interval: once every 360 degrees of crankshaft rotation. However, the 360 twin had a mechanical primary engine balance that was no better than a single.

Inline twins, Japanese inline twins of the 1960s (such as the 1966 Honda “Black Bomber” and the Yamaha TX500) adopted a 180° crank that afforded perfect mechanical primary engine balance, but gave an unequal firing interval; 180 degrees, 540 degrees, 180 degrees, 540 degrees etc - due to one of the two pistons needing to be at top dead centre at the beginning of the power stroke.

The Yamaha TRX850 pioneered the use of a 270° crank. This configuration allowed a firing pattern more regular than a 180° crank, and less regular than a 360° crank. A 270° crank gives the best possible secondary engine balance for a parallel twin, and its exhaust note and power delivery resembles those of a 90° V-twin.

The BMW F 450 GS uses a 135° crank, which results in an uneven firing interval (225 degrees, then 495 degrees, and that in a repeating pattern). The same firing order was also in use during the 1980s and 1990s for two V-Twin engines: Two Honda models, the touring bike PC800 Pacific Coast and the enduro bike XLV750R, used 45° V2 engines with a split pinned crankshaft using a crankpin offset of 90°.

=== Twingles ===
A "twingle" is a four-stroke twin-cylinder engine with an altered firing order designed to give power pulses similar to a single-cylinder four-stroke engine.

Inline twins with a 360° crankpin offset or flat-twins can be easily converted into twingles by firing both of the cylinders at the same time and installing a camshaft or camshafts that operate both cylinders' valves in parallel. Because many such engines already employ the wasted spark principle, only the camshaft modification is necessary. The Vintage Dirt Track Racing Association (VDTRA) 2010 Rules have banned vintage motorcycles from being set up as a twingle.

=== V twins ===
A narrow angle V-twin such as the 45° Harley-Davidson naturally has slightly unevenly spaced power strokes. By changing the ignition timing on one of the cylinders by 360° the power strokes are very closely spaced. This will cause uneven fuel distribution in an engine with a single carburettor. The Harley-Davidson XR-750 with twin carburettors was a popular bike to twingle. It had great success in flattrack racing.

== Three-cylinder engines ==
A straight-three engine is most often equipped with a 120° crankshaft that fires evenly every 240°. The Laverda Jota 180, produced between 1973 and 1981, was the first motorcycle to use a different kind of crankshaft. In the Jota, a "flat-plane" crankshaft was used which has cylinders 1 and 3 offset by 360° while the second one is offset by 180° from the outer cylinders.

Triumph Motorcycles Ltd is another company that used a different firing order on an inline-three and introduced a "T-plane" crankshaft on the 2020 Tiger 900. In this case, cylinders 1 and 2 are offset by 90° and cylinders 2 and 3 are offset by at 90°, resulting in the crank pin arrangement resembling the letter T. Triumph claims improved low-end character, off-road feel, and a unique sound.

Engine	Crankshaft	Ignition timing	Graphical	Example
two stroke even firing I3	120°	120-120-120°	1-1-1-1-1-1-	Suzuki GT 750
four stroke even firing I3	120°	240-240-240	1-0-0-1-0-0-1-0-0-	Yamaha MT-09, Triumph Street Triple & Speed Triple, Triumph Rocket III, MV Agusta Brutale series 675 & 800
four stroke [1] I3 'T-plane' [2] 90° V3	[1] 90°/180° [2] 180°	180-270-270	1-0-1-0-0-1-0-0-	[1] Triumph Tiger 900 (2020) [2] Warchalowski WT 33 & 38
four stroke I3 'Flat-plane'	180°	180-180-360	1-0-1-0-1-0-0-0-	1973-1982 Laverda Jota
even firing two stroke 112° V3	8° / 120°	120-120-120	1-1-1-1-1-1-	1983 Honda NS500
mixed bang two stroke 90° V3	0°	0-90-270	2-1-0-0-2-1-0-0-	1983 Honda MVX250F, 1985 Honda NS400R
four stroke 75° V3	[1] 30° / 240° OR [2] 15° / 120° OR [3] 45° / 240°	[1] 240-165-315; OR [2] 300-300-120; OR [3] 240-240-240	[1] 1-0-0-1-0-1-0-0-0- OR [2] 1-0-0-0-1-0-0-0-1- OR [3] 1-0-0-1-0-0-1-0-0-	2024 Honda V3 concept. [1] primary balance; [2] minimal inertial torque; [3] even firing

== Four-cylinder engines ==
Engine	Crankshaft	Ignition timing	Graphical	Examples
four stroke inline four	0°-180°-180°-0°	180-180-180-180	1-0-1-0-1-0-1-0-	Honda CB750
four stroke inline four "Crossplane"	0°-90°-270°-180°	180-90-180-270	1-0-1-1-0-1-0-0-	2009- Yamaha YZF-R1 & 2004- Yamaha YZR-M1
four stroke inline four "Long bang"	180°	0-180-0-540	2-0-2-0-0-0-0-0-	Shinya Nakano's Kawasaki Ninja ZX-RR
four stroke 60° V4	180° with 60° split pins	180-180-180-180	1-0-1-0-1-0-1-0-	Ford Taunus and Essex V4 engines
four stroke 65° V4	180°	180-115-180-245	1-0-1-1-0-1-0-0-	Aprilia RSV4; 2009-2020 Yamaha V-Max
four stroke 70° V4	180°	180-110-180-250	1-0-1-1-0-1-0-0-	1985-2005 Yamaha V-Max
four stroke 76° V4	360° with 28° split pins	104-256-104-256	1-1-0-0-1-1-0-0-	Honda VFR1200F
four stroke 90° V4	180°	180-270-180-90	1-0-1-1-0-1-0-0-	1986– Honda VFR 750/800
four stroke 90° V4	[1] 0°/360° with 90° split pins [2] 180° with 90° split pins	180-180-180-180	1-0-1-0-1-0-1-0-	[1] Porsche 919 Hybrid Gen 1 early development engine [2] Porsche 919 Hybrid Gen 2 engine, ZAZ Zaporozhets, 1956+ Wisconsin Motor Manufacturing Company V4 engine
four stroke 90° V4 "Twin pulse"	70°	90-200-90-340	1-1-0-1-1-0-0-0-	Ducati Desmosedici RR, Ducati Panigale V4
four stroke 90° V4 "Baby Block"	75°	345-90-195-90	1-1-0-1-1-0-0-0-	Motus MV4/MV4R
four stroke 90° V4 "Droner"	360°	90-270-90-270	1-1-0-0-1-1-0-0-	Honda RVF400/VF/RC30/RC45, 2012–2016 Honda RC213V
90° V4 "Big bang"	180°	90-90-90-450	1-1-1-1-0-0-0-0-	2017– Honda RC213V, Langdon Honda VFR750F RC36
112° V4 "Big bang" (two-stroke)	0° with 180° bank split	0-68-0-292-0-68-0-292	2-2-0-0-2-2-0-0-	1990 Honda NSR500
90° V4 "Screamer" (two-stroke)	180° with no bank split	90-90-90-90-90-90-90-90	1-1-1-1-1-1-1-1-	1984 Honda NSR500

Note that typical two-stroke V4s have four crank throws or pins (see below) so it is important to stipulate all four crank pin phases with the two-stroke engines. The "split" in this case is referring to the difference in phase between piston pairs in "opposite" banks that would normally share a crank pin in a four-stroke engine.

The Ford V4s use split-pin crankshafts, like many 60° V6s. Just as with a boxer-four, piston pairs from opposite banks reach top-dead-centre at the same time, but with a crankpin split of only 60° instead of 180°, potentially giving a shorter and stronger or stiffer crankshaft. For 60° V6s, the crankpins are usually split the other way causing the paired pistons to reach top-dead-centre 120° apart.

=== Inline fours ===
As with many even-firing engines with four or more cylinders, an even-firing four-cylinder engine is sometimes referred to as a "Screamer". A "long bang" inline 4 engine fires both pairs of cylinders in quick succession or simultaneously; the power delivery is identical to a parallel twin with a 180° crank and similar to a V-twin. In 2005 Kawasaki experimented with this configuration on the ZX-RR MotoGP bike.

=== 2-stroke V4 ===
Typical two-stroke V4s have four crank throws, or crank pins, instead of the two that most four-stroke V4s have (two connecting rods sharing each pin). This is primarily because each piston needed its own sealed crankcase volume for the purposes of efficient induction, where in some cases separate crankshafts served each bank in order to achieve this.

The Honda NSR500 began and ended its life as a "screamer", where the pistons were phased similarly to a four-stroke V-four with a 180° crank. However, in 1990 Honda set the crankpin phases of each pair of pistons within each bank to be the same (like a four-stroke "droner": 360° crank), but with each bank's crankpins offset by 180° to each other (effectively "splitting" the pins and changing the V-angle, in terms of ignition timing). This was called a "big bang" engine.

Yamaha created a big bang YZR500 in 1992. The YZR500 had two crankshafts like a U engine and the angle between each pair of cylinders was 90°, like a V4.

In 1997 Mick Doohan wanted to run a 180° screamer engine. HRC crew chief Jerry Burgess explained "The 180 got back a direct relationship between the throttle and the rear wheel, When the tire spun I could roll off without losing drive. The big bang has a lot of engine braking, so it upsets the bike into corners, then when you open the throttle you get this sudden pulse of power, which again upsets the suspension. Mick's secret is corner speed, so he needs the bike to be smooth and the 180 is much smoother."

== Five-cylinder engines ==
Engine	Crankshaft	Ignition timing	Graphical	Example
four stroke even-firing I5	144°	144-144-144-144-144	1-1-1-1-1-	Various
four stroke I5 with a 120° crank	120°	120-120-120-120-240	1-1-1-1-1-0-	Honda RC148 & RC149 - straight-six with one cylinder removed
75.5° V5	360°-104.5°-360°	{1} 75.5-104.5-180-75.5-284.5 {2} 0-284.5-180-0-255.5	{1} 1-1-0-1-0-0-1-1-0-0- {2} 2-0-0-0-1-0-0-2-0-0-	Honda RC211V - {1} 2001, 3 exhausts, sequential ignitions {2} Honda RC211V - 2004, 4 exhausts, simultaneous ignitions
regular firing four stroke 60° V5	144° / 12° split pins	144-144-144-144-144	1-1-1-1-1-	Oldsmobile Diesel V5 prototype

== Six-cylinder engines ==
Engine	Crankshaft	Ignition timing	Graphical	Example
Even-fire I6	120°	120-120-120-120-120-120	1-1-1-1-1-1-	Various
[1] 120° V6 even-fire [2] 90° even-fire V6 [3] 60° even-fire V6 [4] Boxer 6	[1] 120° common pin [2] 120° with −30° split pins [3] 120° with −60° split pins [4] 120° with 180° split pins	120-120-120-120-120-120	1-1-1-1-1-1-	[1] Ferrari 156, Ferrari 296 GTB, McLaren Artura [2] VW / Audi, Mercedes, Chevrolet, Ford etc. [3] Alfa Romeo Busso, Nissan; PSA ES/L engine [4] Porsche, Subaru, Chevrolet Corvair
90° odd-fire V6	120° common pin	90-150-90-150-90-150	1-1-0-1-1-0-1-1-0-	Buick V6 and Renault PRV engine (early versions of both); Alfa Romeo Giulia Quadrifoglio; 2014+ Formula 1
