= Big Bang (disambiguation) =

The Big Bang was, according to the prevailing cosmological theory of the universe's early development, the event that led to the formation of the universe.

Big Bang may also refer to:

== Science ==
- Big Bang nucleosynthesis, the production of certain hydrogen isotopes early in the universe's existence
- Cold Big Bang, an alternative theory in which the start of the universe is at absolute zero

== Arts, entertainment, and media ==
=== Films ===
- Big Bang (film), a 2007 Korean film by Jeong-woo Park
- The Big Bang (1987 film), also referred to as Le Big-Bang, an X-rated animated science fiction fantasy film, directed by Picha
- The Big Bang (1989 film), a documentary by James Toback
- The Big Bang (2011 film), a thriller starring Sienna Guillory and Antonio Banderas
- The Big Bang (2019 film), an Indian Malayalam-language short film

=== Music ===
==== Groups ====
- Big Bang (British band), a British electronic synthpop duo formed in 1988
- Bigbang (Norwegian band), a Norwegian rock trio formed in 1992
- BigBang (South Korean band), a South Korean boy band formed in 2006

==== Albums ====
- Big Bang (single album), eponymous single album by the South Korean boy band
- Big Bang (BigBang album), eponymous Japanese-language studio album by the South Korean boy band
- Big Bang (Los Enanitos Verdes album), 1994
- Big Bang (Magdallan album), 1992
- Big Bang (Os Paralamas do Sucesso album), 1989
- Big Bang (Waltari album), 1995
- Big Bang!, a 1989 album by Fuzzbox
- Big Bang!!!, an album by Shoko Nakagawa
- The Big Bang (Busta Rhymes album), 2006
- The Big Bang (Dom & Roland album), 2011
- The Big Bang!: Best of the MC5, a 2000 album by MC5
- The Big Bang – The Essential Collection, an album by TNT

==== Songs ====
- "Big Bang", a song by Bad Religion from No Control
- "Big Bang", a song by Cursive from Happy Hollow
- "Big Bang", a 2007 song by Les Horribles Cernettes
- "The Big Bang" (song), a 2010 song by Rock Mafia
- "The Big Bang", a song by Godley & Creme from Goodbye Blue Sky
- "The Big Bang", a song by Johnny Mandel from soundtrack for Caddyshack

=== Television ===
- The Big Bang (TV series), a children's TV science programme shown on ITV from 1996 to 2004
- "The Big Bang" (Atlanta), 2016
- "The Big Bang" (Charlie Jade), 2005
- "The Big Bang" (Doctor Who), 2010
- The Big Bang (Entourage), 2011

=== Other uses in arts, entertainment, and media ===
- Big Bang (Singh book), a 2004 book by Simon Singh about the cosmological model
- Big Bang (novel), a 2019 novel by David Bowman
- Big Bang, a game mode in the puzzle video game Puyo Puyo Tetris
- Big Bang Comics, Gary Carlson and Chris Ecker's retro-style comic book
- Hublot Big Bang, a wristwatch
- Big-Bang Cannon, a toy
- The Big Bang, an event in Fortnite: Battle Royale
- Big Bang Entertainment, a Pakistani entertainment company
- Big Bang (video game), a 1988 stock market simulator video game for MS-DOS
- Big Bang, a 1995 video game made by Psycore for the Acorn Archimedes and DOS

== Events ==
- Big Bang (comics), a Milestone Comics event
- Big Bang (financial markets), the deregulation of financial markets in the United Kingdom in 1986
- The Big Bang Fair, or The Big Bang UK Young Scientists and Engineers Fair, a celebration of science, technology, engineering and maths for young people
- Operation Big Bang, "British Bang" or "Big Bang"; one of the largest conventional explosions in history
- ROH The Big Bang!, a wrestling event

== Other uses ==
- Big Bang (faction), a faction within the Democratic Party, a political party in Italy
- Big bang adoption, instant changeover as a system adoption process
- Big-bang firing order, an aspect of some motorcycle engines
- System 7 or Big Bang, a Macintosh operating system

== See also ==
- A Bigger Bang, a 2005 album by The Rolling Stones
- Big Bang Theory (disambiguation)
- "Pig Bang", a rocky planet and the first episode from the game Angry Birds Space
