= Honda NS400R =

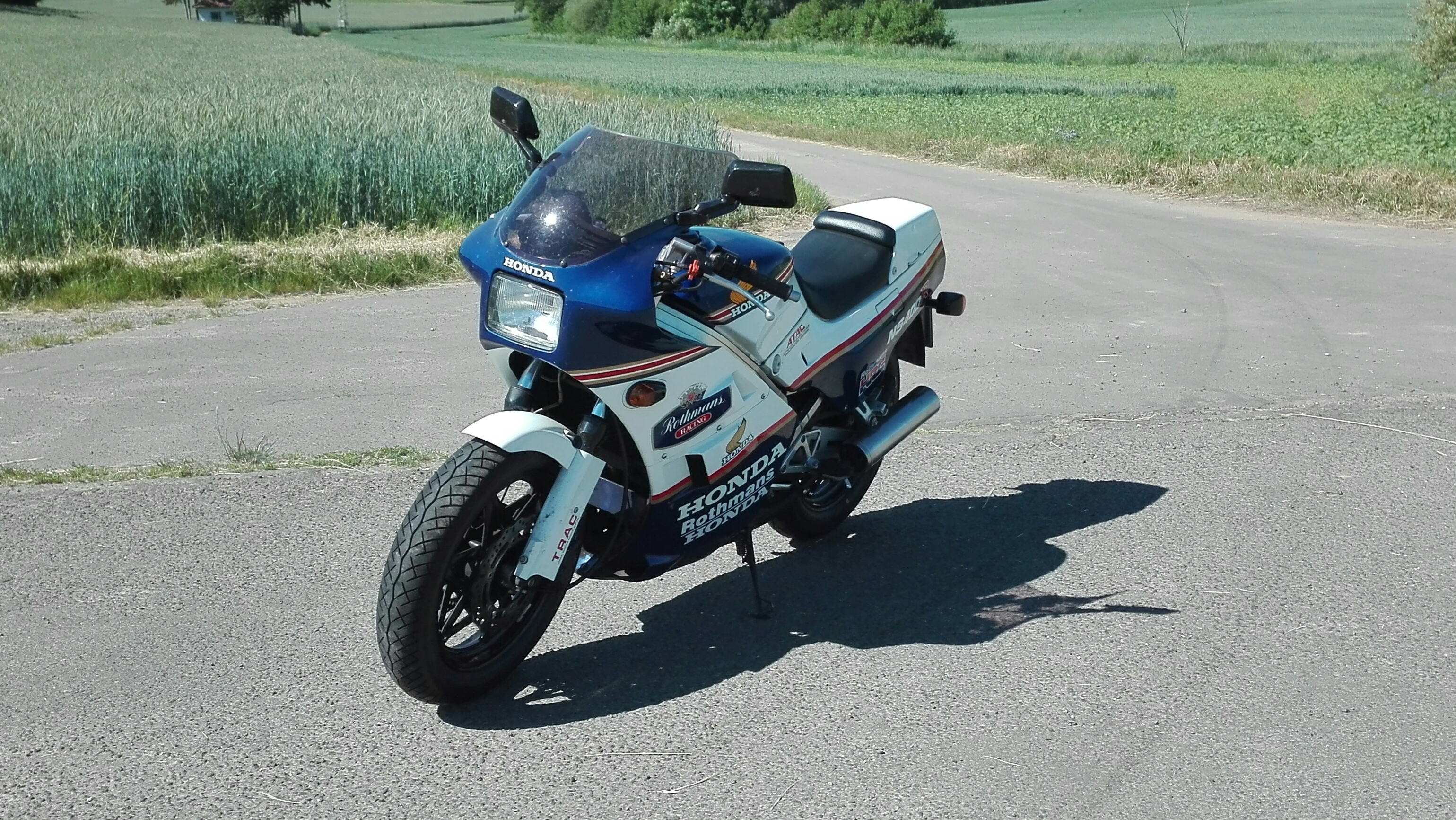
- Manufacturer: Honda
- Production: 1985 – 1987 12,000 units total
- Engine: 387 cc (23.6 cu in) two-stroke liquid-cooled oil injected 90° V3
- Bore / stroke: 57 mm × 50.6 mm (2.24 in × 1.99 in)
- Top speed: export version 135mph, japan version 120mph
- Power: 72 hp (73 PS; 54 kW) @ 9,500 rpm, Japan version restricted to 59hp
- Transmission: 6-speed wet clutch
- Brakes: Dual discs (front); Single disc (rear)
- Tires: 100/90-16 (front); 110/90-17 (rear)
- Wheelbase: 1385 mm
- Dimensions: L: 2065 mm W: 720 mm H: 1150 mm
- Seat height: 790 mm
- Weight: 163 kg (dry); 183 kg (wet)
- Fuel capacity: 19L
- Oil capacity: 2 L (0.53 US gal)
- Fuel consumption: 29 km/L @ 60 km/h
- Related: Honda NS500

The Honda NS400R is a street-legal two-stroke sports bike produced by Honda starting in 1985. It was the first mainstream roadster from Honda without valves and cams. The engine was a revamp and upgrade of the old Honda MVX250F. The NS400R lacked outright power and top speed against its rivals Suzuki RG500 and Yamaha RD500LC. The NS400R is Honda's largest-displacement street-legal two-stroke road bike.

== History ==
The limited-production NS400R was only sold from 1985 to 1988 and traces its lineage back to 1979. Honda was dominant in 500 cc class motocross racing with two-stroke engines, but its four-stroke Grand Prix bikes were lagging behind the competition. After internal deliberation over its four-stroke racing heritage, Honda pushed forward with two-stroke development. The resulting water-cooled NS500 fused the power of three two-stroke motocross engines into a compact and lightweight V3 configuration that produced 120 hp (89 kW) at 11,000 rpm.

Rider Freddie Spencer gave Honda their first 500 cc class win in 15 years on an NS500 in 1982, and then rode a lighter and more powerful NS500 to a 1983 500 cc World Championship victory. The following year, Honda manufactured a limited-production version of the championship racer for privateers, called the RS500, that was a near duplicate of the works machine without the specialized exhaust.

Yamaha and Suzuki had already released street-legal replicas of their racing bikes, so Honda responded with the NS400R in 1985. Its 387 cc liquid-cooled two-stroke V3 produced 72 hp (54 kW) at 9,500 RPM with triple flat-slide carburetors, and was coupled to a 6-speed transmission with a wet clutch. TRAC ("Torque Reactive Anti-dive Control") anti-dive front fork and a Pro-Link rear swingarm were combined with a box-section alloy frame and three disc brakes with dual-piston calipers. The resulting road-going replica racer was a street-legal facsimile of the NS500 V-3 on which Spencer became the youngest ever world champion at the time, at 21 years old.

Honda discontinued the NS400R in 1988. N stands for Nickel, and S stands for Silicon-carbide. This was the special hard coating called Nikasil on the cylinder walls.
