= David Layzer =

American astrophysicist and cosmologist (1925–2019)

- Born: December 31, 1925; Cleveland, Ohio, U.S.
- Died: August 16, 2019 (aged 93); Belmont, Massachusetts, U.S.
- Education: Harvard University (A.B., 1947; Ph.D., 1950)
- Known for: Cold Big Bang
- Awards: Member of the American Academy of Arts and Sciences
- Scientific career
- Fields: Astrophysics
- Workplaces: Harvard University
- Thesis: Two problems in the theory of atomic spectra: orbit-orbit interaction and central fields (1950)
- Doctoral advisor: Donald H. Menzel
- Notable students: Carlos Varsavsky; Joseph Silk

David Raymond Layzer (December 31, 1925 – August 16, 2019) was an American astrophysicist, cosmologist, and the Donald H. Menzel Professor Emeritus of Astronomy at Harvard University.

Layzer was born in Cleveland, Ohio and received his education at Harvard University. He was awarded a Ph.D. in 1950 with a thesis titled, Two problems in the theory of atomic spectra: orbit-orbit interaction and central fields. He is known for his cosmological theory of the expansion of the universe, which postulates that its order and information are increasing despite the second law of thermodynamics.

Layzer is known for being one of the most notable researchers who advocated for a Cold Big Bang theory. When he proposed this theory in 1966, he suggested it would solve Olbers' paradox, which holds that the night sky on Earth should be much brighter than it actually is. He proposed a solution to the paradox of time's arrow. The fundamental laws of physics don't distinguish positive from negative time, and yet the Second Law of Thermodynamics (and our everyday life) tell us that time "flows" in one direction.

He published several articles critiquing hereditarian views on human intelligence, such as those of Richard Herrnstein and Arthur Jensen.

He became a member of the American Academy of Arts and Sciences in 1963, and was also a member of Divisions B and J of the International Astronomical Union. He died in Belmont at the age of 93 in 2019.

== Bibliography ==
- Cosmogenesis - The Growth of Order in the Universe, Oxford University Press, New York, 1990, ISBN 9780195069082
- Why We are Free, Anthony Aguirre and Bob Doyle, Editors, Cambridge, MA, USA, 2021, ISBN 978-0-9835802-5-6
