= David Bowman (writer) =

American writer (1957–2012)

- Born: December 8, 1957
- Died: February 27, 2012 (aged 54)
- Occupation: Writer

David Bowman (December 8, 1957 – February 27, 2012) was an American writer. He published two novels and one book of music criticism before his death in 2012, at age 54. A third novel, Big Bang, was published on January 15, 2019, by Little, Brown and Company. Bowman also wrote for Salon.

== Books ==
His first novel, Let the Dog Drive, was a 1993 New York Times Notable Book. It also won the Elmer Holmes Bobst Award for Emerging Writers.

Bunny Modern, his second novel, was published in 1998; Spin called it "lively, whacked-out, [and] often surprisingly moving."

Bowman's only work of nonfiction, This Must Be the Place: The Adventures of the Talking Heads in the 20th Century, about Talking Heads, came out in 2001.

Big Bang, Bowman's posthumous novel, received critical acclaim.
