= Yamaha YZR-M1 =

Sport motorcycle

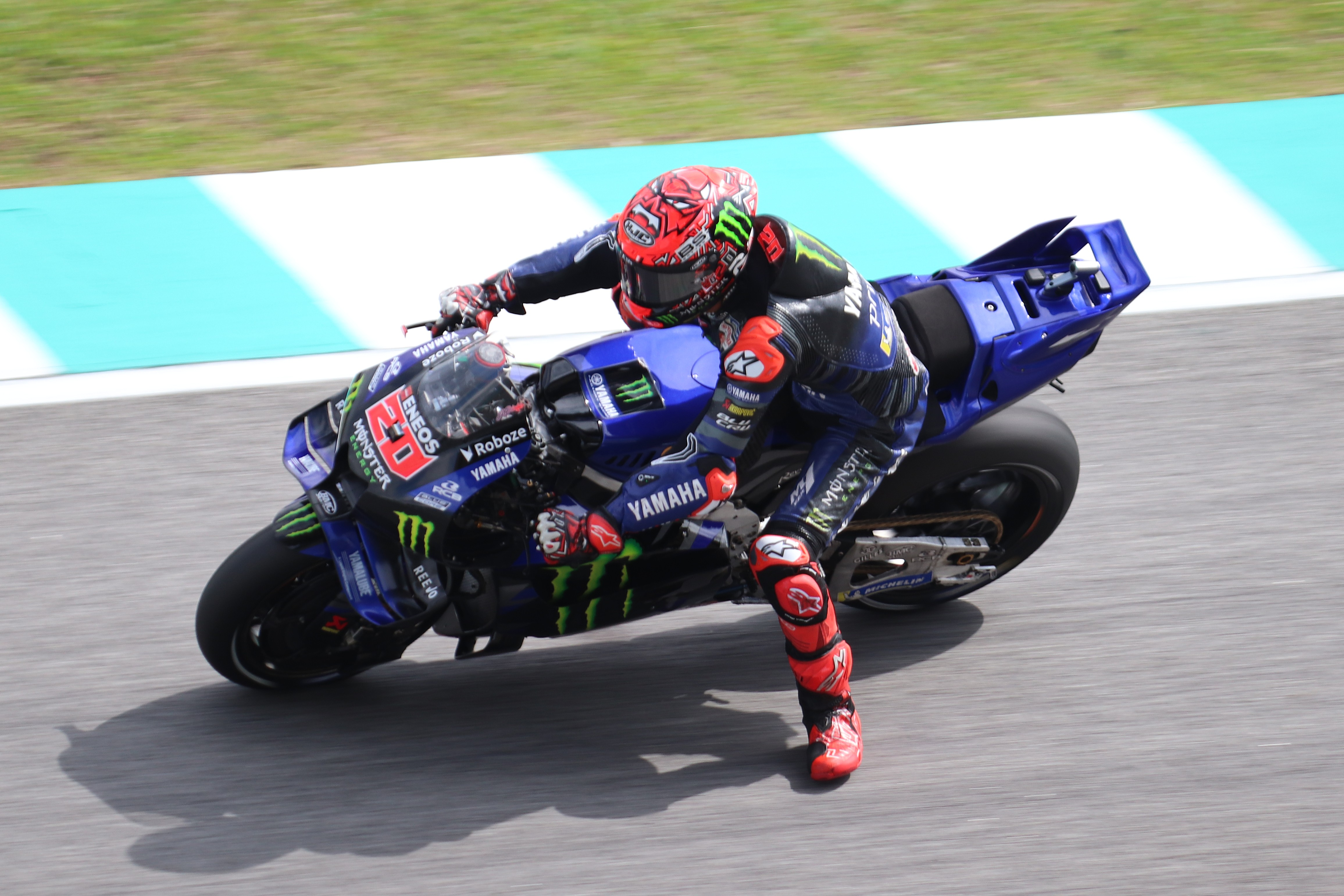
- Fabio Quartararo riding the Yamaha YZR-M1 at Sepang 2025
- Manufacturer: Yamaha Motor Company
- Production: 2002–present
- Predecessor: Yamaha YZR500
- Class: MotoGP prototype
- Engine: 800–1,000 cc (49–61 cu in) I4, 16-valve, DOHC, four valves per cylinder, crossplane crankshaft (2002–2025), V4, 16-valve, DOHC, four valves per cylinder (2026–present)
- Wheelbase: 1,450 mm (57 in)
- Dimensions: L: 2,060 mm (81 in); W: 650 mm (26 in)
- Seat height: 1,150 mm (45 in)
- Weight: 160 kg (353 lb) (dry)
- Fuel capacity: 22L

The Yamaha YZR-M1 is a Grand Prix road racing motorcycle specifically developed by Yamaha Motor Company to race in the current MotoGP series. It succeeded the 500 cc (31 cu in) YZR500 by the 2002 season and was originally developed with a 990 cc (60 cu in) engine. Since then, the YZR-M1 has been continuously developed into several iterations through the 990cc, 800cc and 1000cc eras of Grand Prix motorcycle racing.

== 2002–2006 ==
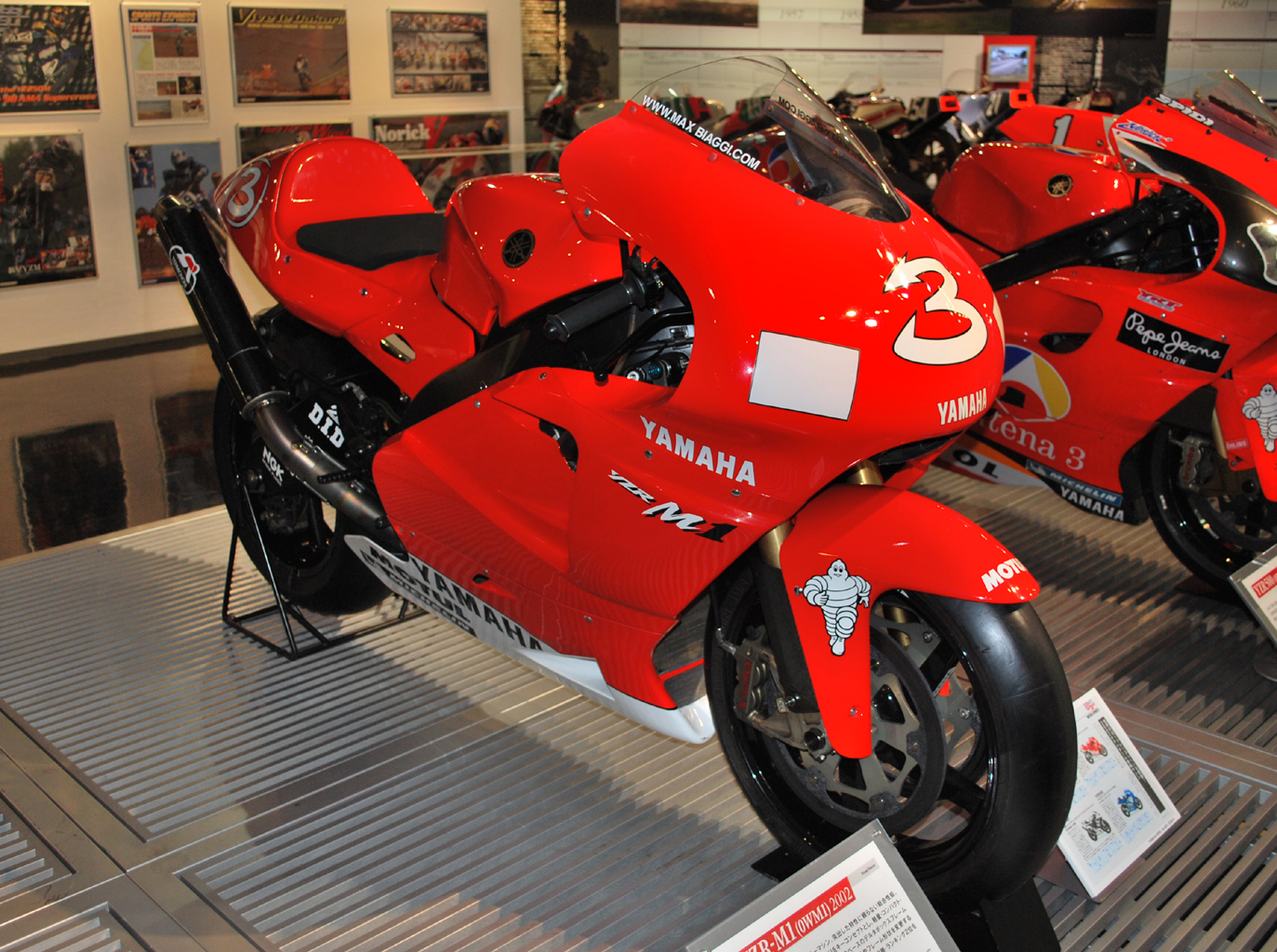
2002 Yamaha YZR-M1

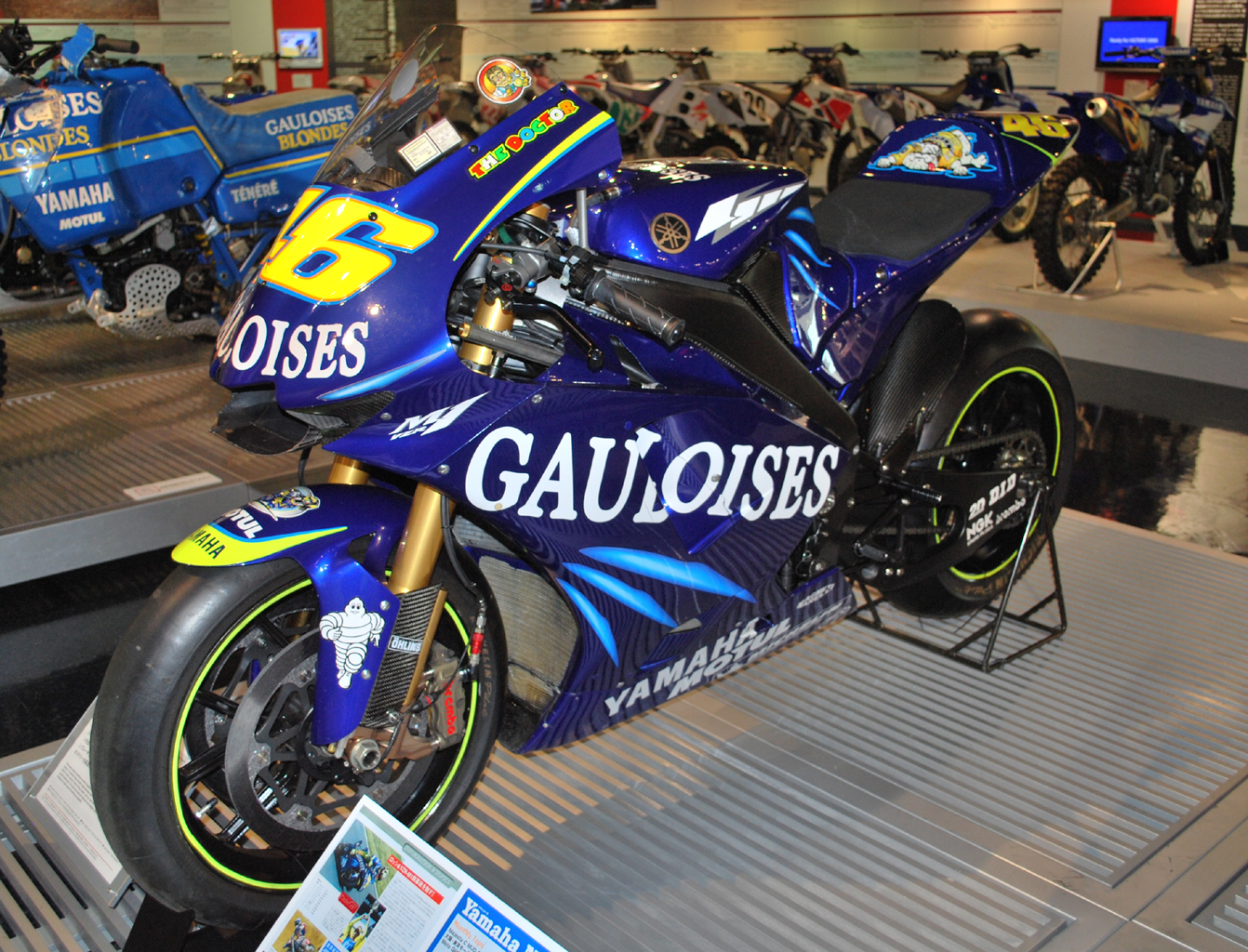
2004 Yamaha YZR-M1

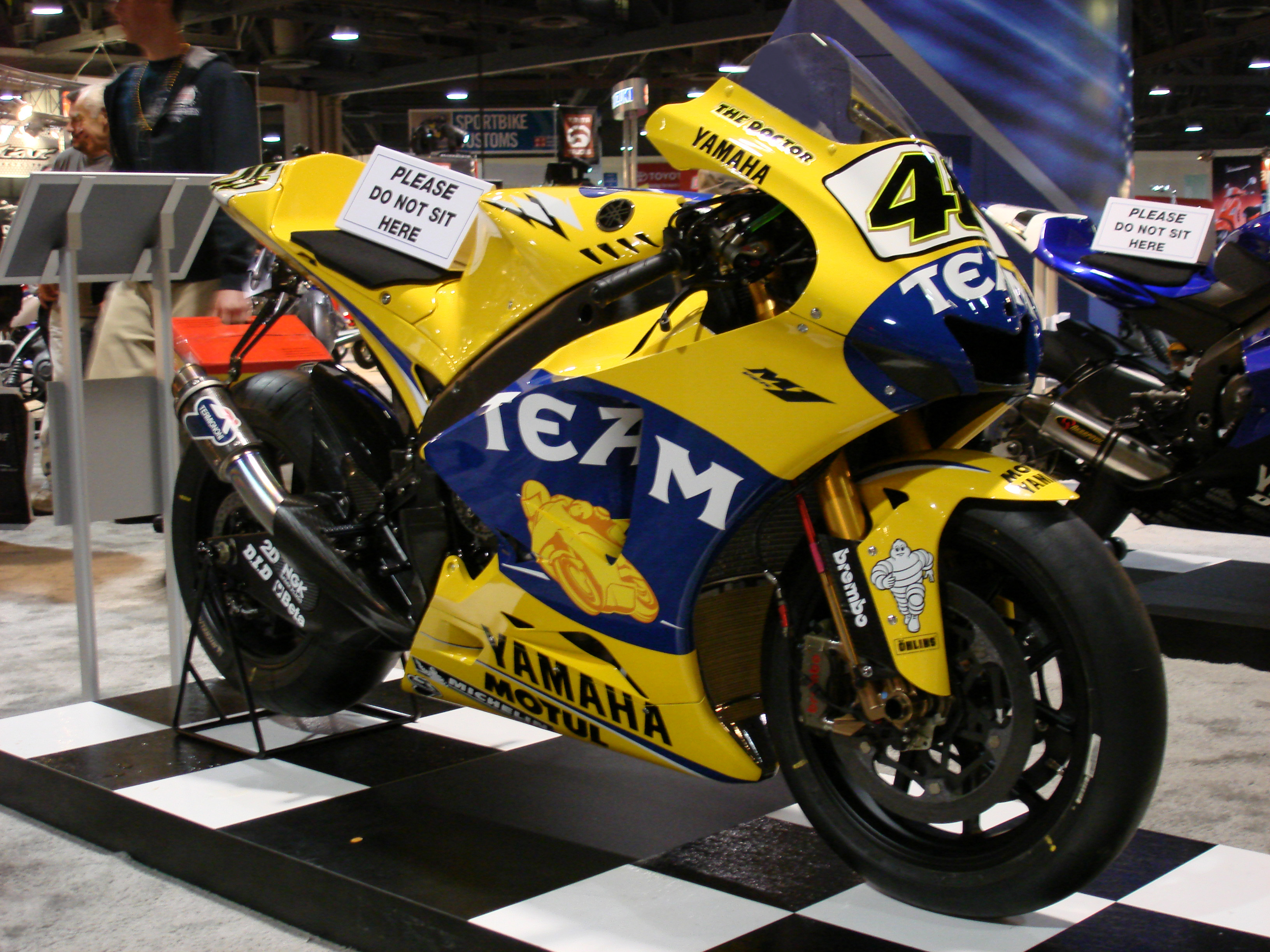
Valentino Rossi's 2006 Yamaha YZR-M1

2002 was the first season that allowed 990 cc 4-strokes to be raced alongside 500 cc 2-strokes. In a change from their V-4 YZR500, Yamaha designed the YZR-M1 (for "Mission One") with an inline-4 engine because it was the format considered to have the best mutual balance with the frame. Yamaha wanted to preserve the superior handling of the YZR500, so the M1's engine was designed to fit in a chassis developed around the basic structure of the YZR500. The M1 used an electronic engine management system that controlled the engine braking endemic to four-strokes. The new engine had five valves per cylinder, was fed by carburetors and began with a displacement of 942 cc; in the second half of the season it progressed to the full 990 cc regulation limit. The frame design also evolved during the season, with adjustment of the engine mounting position and change in the fuel tank shape.

The M1 was test-ridden and developed by Max Biaggi, John Kocinski, Norihiko Fujiwara and Kyoji Namba throughout 2001. It was raced in the 2002 season by Biaggi and Carlos Checa on the factory team, and towards the end of the season M1s were also provided to Norifumi Abe, Olivier Jacque and Shinya Nakano. Biaggi achieved two wins and placed second in the final standings as did Yamaha in the manufacturers' championship.

In 2003, the engine went from carburetion to fuel injection, and the engine brake control system was replaced with an Idle Control System that automatically adjusted the throttle valve opening on two of the four cylinders to improve stability and handling during deceleration. M1 riders were Checa, Alex Barros, Olivier Jacque, Marco Melandri, Shinya Nakano and Norifumi Abe, and there were no wins and Yamaha came in third in the manufacturers' championship.

Valentino Rossi joined Yamaha on a two-year contract starting in 2004. At the time, contemporary media and analysts questioned whether the YZR-M1 could be developed quickly enough to compete with the Honda RC211V, which had dominated the previous two seasons. While Honda continued to iterate on the RC211V over the 2003–2004 winter off-season, Yamaha focused on an accelerated development program for the M1 to close the performance gap.

In addition to Rossi, several key technical personnel moved from Honda to Yamaha, including crew chief Jeremy Burgess and most of his mechanical team. This transfer of expertise was later identified by Rossi as a primary factor in establishing the development framework for the YZR-M1's 2004 campaign.

During the 2003–2004 winter testing period, Yamaha focused on refining the M1’s chassis strengths, particularly its braking and handling, while addressing issues with power delivery. Under project leader Koichi Tsuji, engineers transitioned from a five-valve per cylinder head to a four-valve configuration. They also introduced a revised cylinder firing order, changing the engine from a standard "screamer" (with equal 180° firing intervals) to a "long-bang" configuration (spaced at 270°-180°-90°-180°).

This firing order was designed to mimic the constant kinetic energy of a V4 engine while retaining the compact packaging of an inline-four. These mechanical changes, along with adjustments to the engine's position within the chassis, were intended to improve torque characteristics and traction during corner exits. The updated M1's increased competitiveness was noted during the 2004 pre-season IRTA tests at Catalunya, where Rossi recorded the fastest lap of the session.

The 2004 season began at Welkom in South Africa following the removal of Suzuka from the calendar due to safety considerations. The YZR-M1 won its debut race under the new technical configuration, making Rossi the first rider to win consecutive Grands Prix with different manufacturers. Over the course of the season, the M1 recorded nine victories and 304 points, securing the Riders' Championship. Honda riders Sete Gibernau and Max Biaggi finished second and third in the standings with 257 and 217 points, respectively.

The 2004 season demonstrated the effectiveness of the M1's redesign under Rossi and crew chief Jeremy Burgess. Rossi's championship win that year marked a turnaround for the Yamaha project, as he became the first rider to win back-to-back premier class titles for different manufacturers.

The YZR-M1 and Rossi partnership continued to dominate in 2005 when the Championship was won by a massive 147 point margin over Honda rider Marco Melandri in second place. The 2005 M1 was hailed by insiders to be a great race bike: Yamaha with input from Rossi had created a race bike to beat the others quite easily. Rossi later said that the 2005 M1 was the greatest bike he had ever ridden.

The 2006 season proved a little more problematic for Yamaha. The M1 suffered from chatter from the very first race of the year. It was a recurring problem for all Yamaha riders in the first third of the season, and was thought to be a function of three major winter season developments: a significant increase in engine power, a new, stiffer, chassis and a new construction of Michelin tire with an even stickier compound and revised profile. Because the three developments occurred almost simultaneously, the usual meticulous testing of one development at a time was compromised and it took much of the early season to understand and overcome the problems.

This setback for Yamaha and the YZR-M1 was largely responsible for Valentino Rossi's mediocre start to the 2006 season, manifest by poor qualifying performances and a brace of bad luck. At midseason he suffered a wrist injury, which added to his woes. In the final third of a memorable season, the M1's problems were virtually eradicated, and Valentino Rossi turned in a string of performances that almost closed a large points gap on Championship leader Nicky Hayden aboard the Honda RC211V. It was only in the final race of the season that the M1 and Valentino Rossi were beaten by just five points and Yamaha relinquished the Championship to Honda. Hayden won only two races that season, and later stated that Rossi deserved to be the champion, but luck and DNFs cost him the championship. Valentino Rossi won 5 races in 2006 to Nicky Hayden's 2, a fact that was well played during the offseason.

== 2007–2011 ==
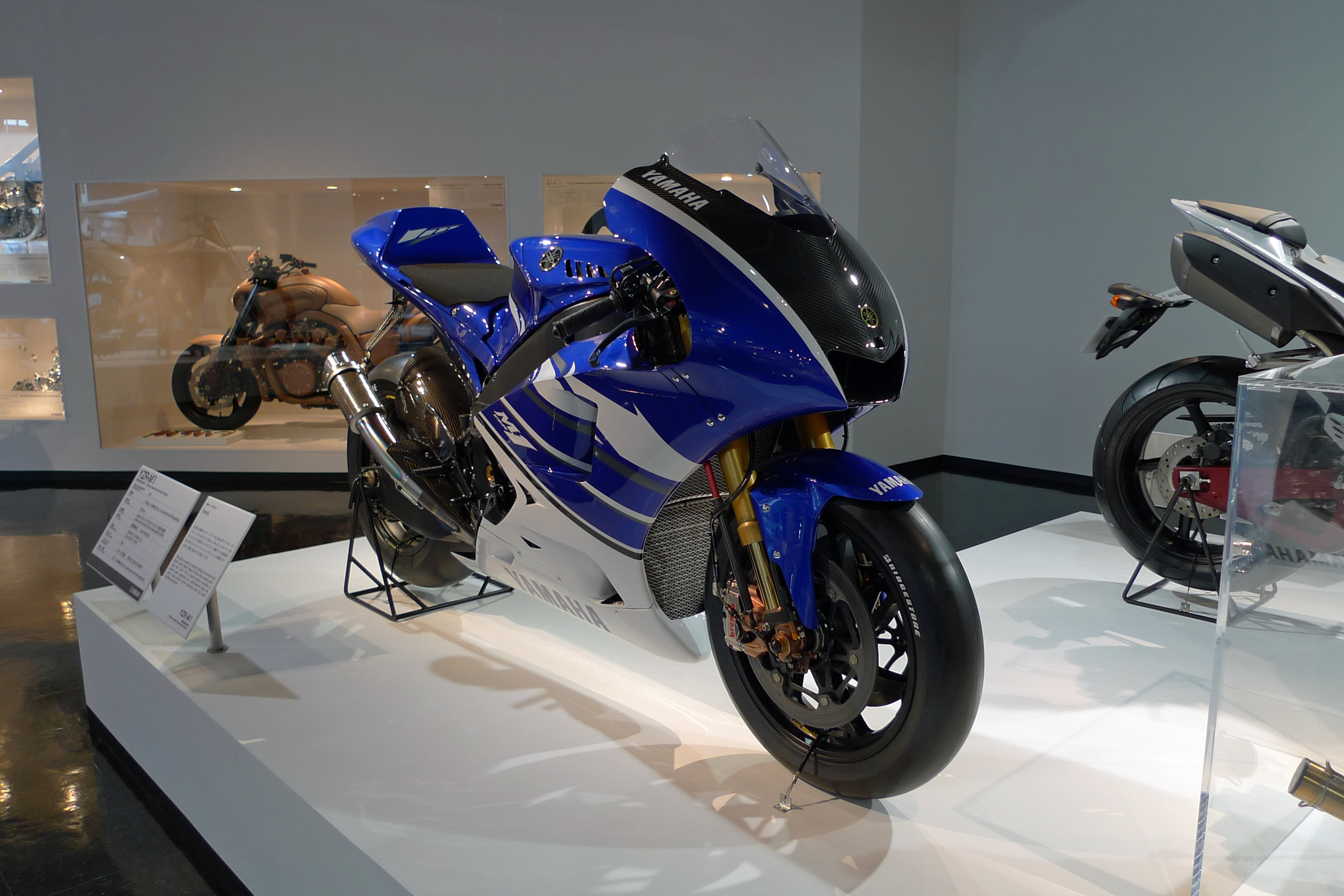
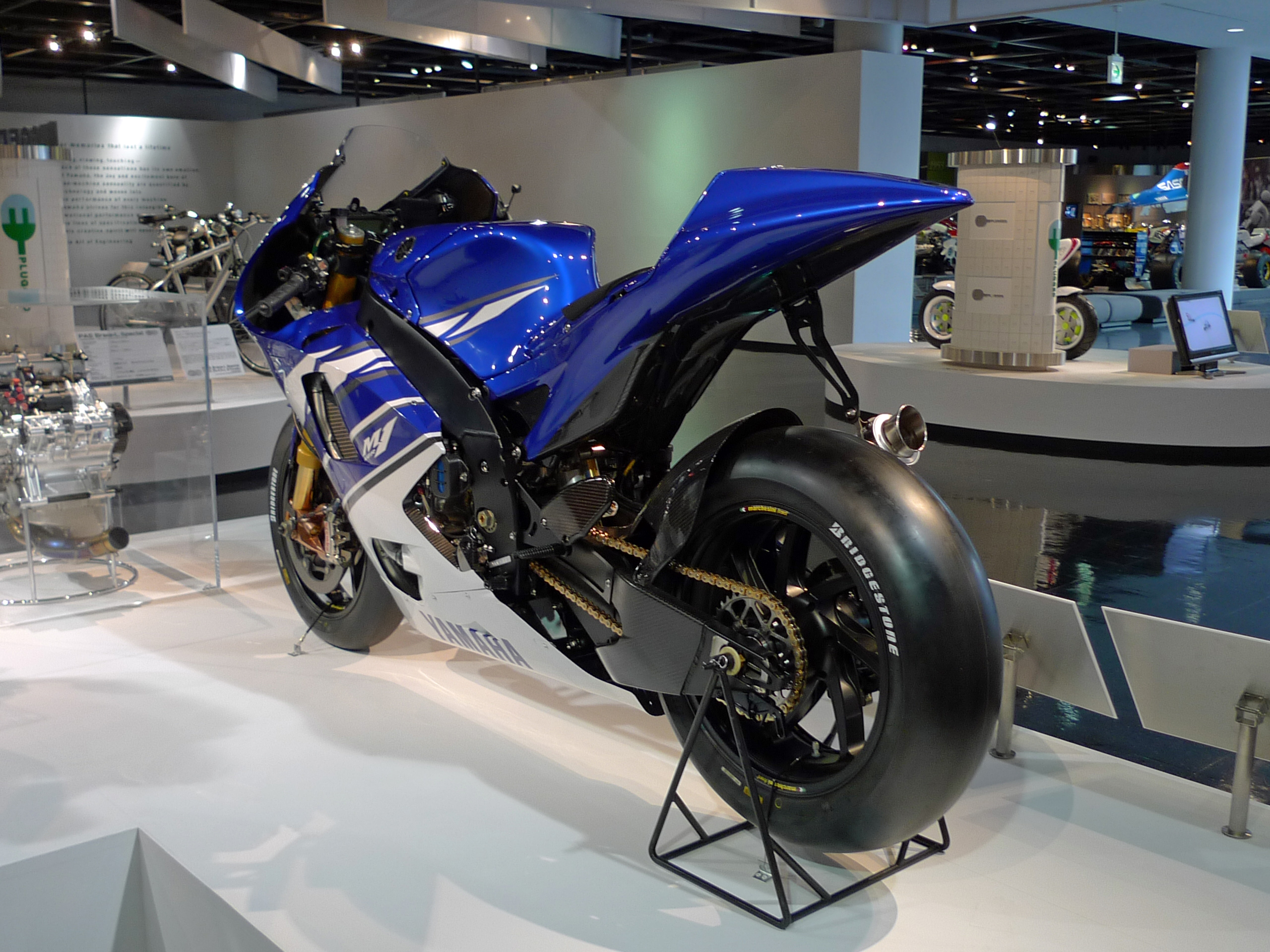
2010 Yamaha YZR-M1

Regulations again changed for the 2007 season with the capacity of MotoGP machines reduced to 800 cc in an effort by the FIM to reduce the ever-increasing speeds of the 990 cc bikes (capable of well in excess of 210 mph (340 km/h)); therefore the YZR-M1 continued in 800 cc form. In post-2006 and in 2007 pre-season testing, the new 800 cc equipped YZR-M1 (along with other 800 cc MotoGP bikes) was quicker straight out of the box than the 990 cc version of the M1. This was by virtue of later, harder braking, quicker handling, higher corner speeds, and more controllable traction, and as the 2007 season began the 800 cc YZR-M1 was expected to get quicker as its development continued.

The chatter that plagued the early 2006 YZR-M1 was eliminated in the switch to 800 cc. The main sponsor for the Official Factory Yamaha Team switched from Camel, with their distinctive yellow and blue livery, to that of the Italian motor manufacturer Fiat. The team ran initially in a blue and white colour scheme and hinted at the unusual intention of running a variety of colour schemes throughout the season.

Casey Stoner won the 2007 Championship with the factory Ducati.

Rossi won the 2008 Championship, by a record margin and dominated podium finishes all season. Teammate Jorge Lorenzo managed a first-ever Rookie win on the M1 at the Portuguese GP, and had 6 podium finishes.

== 2012–2025 ==
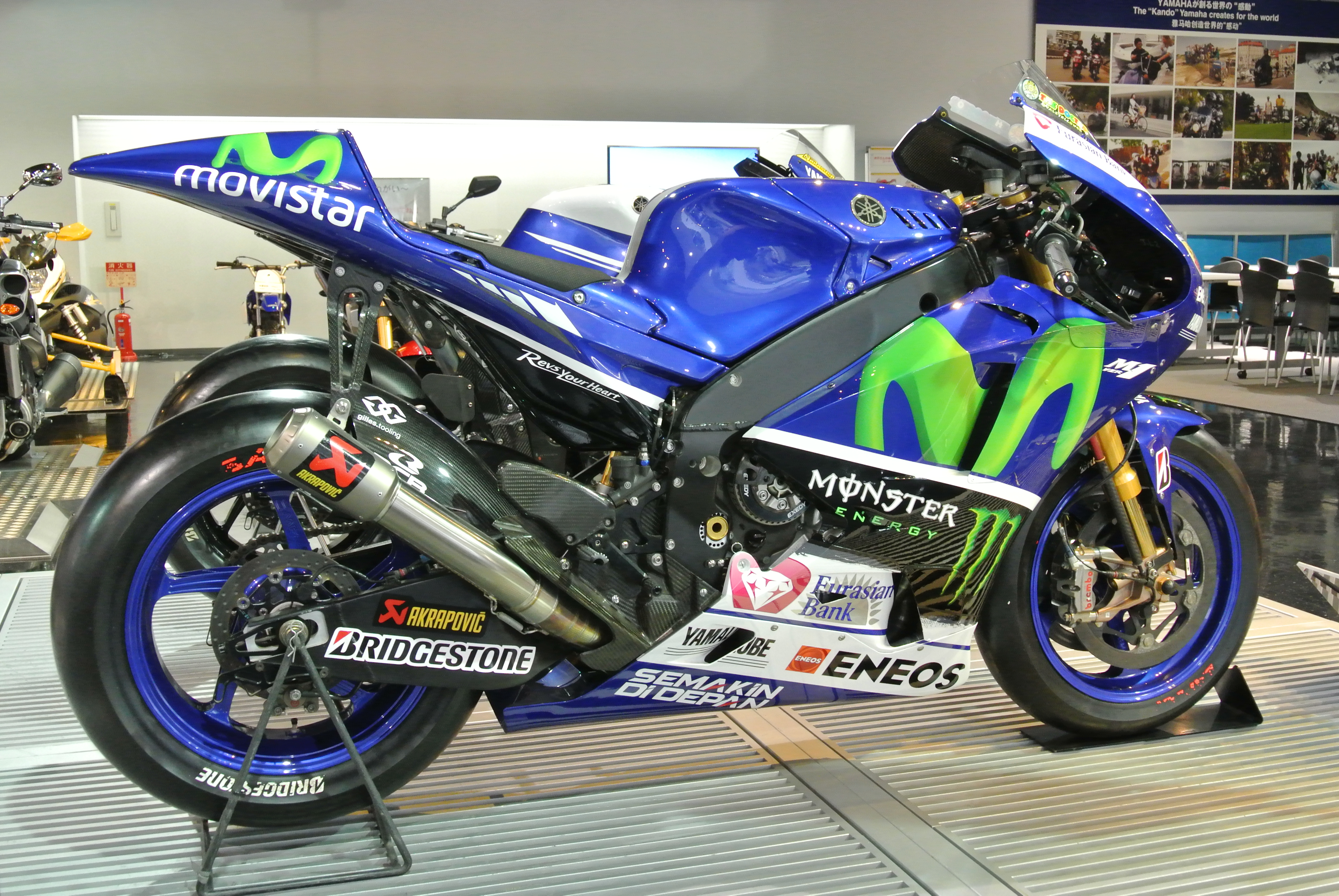
2015 Yamaha YZR-M1

For the 2012 season, the maximum engine capacity was increased to 1,000 cc (1.0 L; 61.0 cu in), with a limit of 4 cylinders and a maximum 81 mm cylinder bore. Jorge Lorenzo won the 2012 Championship, closely followed by Dani Pedrosa.

== V4 era ==
In 2025, Yamaha launched a MotoGP prototype, the V4-powered YZR-M1. The bike was officially unveiled ahead of the race weekend at the Misano Circuit in Italy. This change marked a major step after more than two decades of Yamaha's reliance on crossplane inline-four engines. The new prototype was immediately scheduled to hit the track. Yamaha test rider Augusto Fernández was ready to compete with the new V4 engine at the San Marino GP as a wild card. He was the first to test the bike's performance in real racing conditions. The main goal of this debut was not to chase a podium finish, but rather to gather important data useful for future development.

Beyond the engine, the latest M1 also received new visual and technical touches. The aerodynamics are now quite different. Changes are visible in the design of the tail, side wings, and the upward-curved bellypan at the front. The gill-shaped vents have also been shifted further rearward, likely to maximize airflow to the rear cylinders. The exhaust system has also been redesigned. The M1 now uses two mufflers, one on the right side of the swingarm and the other under the tailpipe. This new exhaust position forced Yamaha to change the tailpipe's shape to meet technical requirements.

The decision to introduce a new engine at the end of 2025 was certainly not without reason. Yamaha wanted to ensure its V4-configured bike was ready to compete in the 2026 season. However, a significant challenge loomed. In 2027, MotoGP regulations changed, reducing engine capacity from 1,000 cc to 850 cc. This meant the new V4 engine would only be used for one full season at most.

== Specifications ==
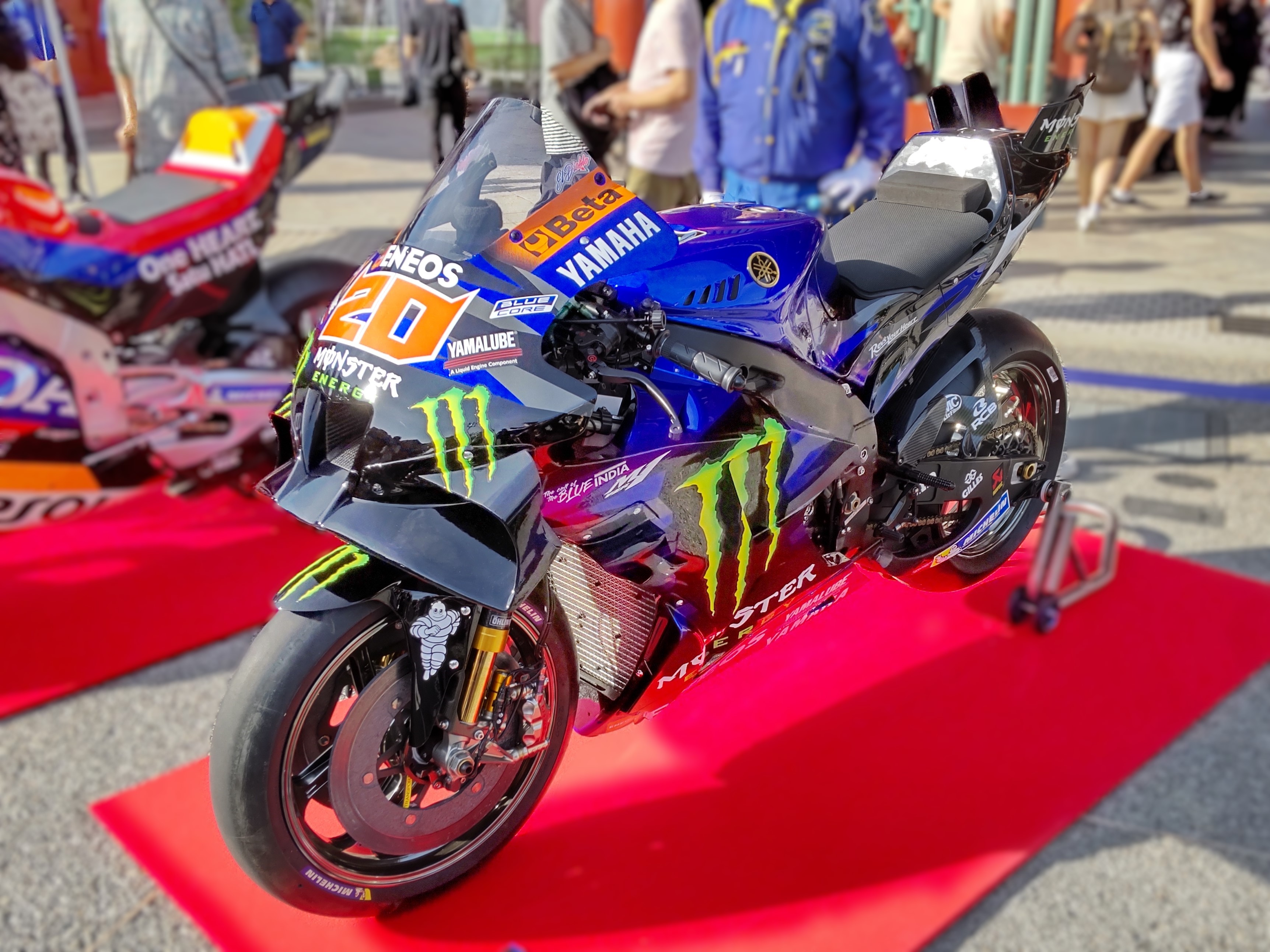
Fabio Quartararo's 2024 Yamaha YZR-M1 in Tokyo

Yamaha YZR-M1 Specifications (as of 2025)
Engine
Engine type:	Liquid-cooled four-stroke, inline 4-cylinder with cross-plane crankshaft, DOHC 16-valve
Displacement:	998 cc (1.0 L; 60.9 cu in)
Ignition:	Magneti Marelli with adjustable mapping – NGK spark plugs
Fuel System:	Fuel injection
Fuel:	TotalEnergies
Lubricants:	Motul (factory; 2002–2007), (Tech3; 2003–2018) & (Pramac; 2025–present); Petronas (factory; 2008–2011) & (SRT/RNF; 2019–2022); ENEOS (factory; 2012–present)
Lubrication system:	Wet sump
Data recording:	2D
Maximum power:	Around 249 PS/183 kW
Maximum speed:	In excess of 340 km/h (211 mph)
Exhaust:	Akrapovič
Transmission
Type:	6-speed cassette-type gearbox, with alternative gear ratios available
Primary drive:	Gear
Clutch:	Dry multi-plate slipper clutch
Other speed specifications:	0-200MPH 16.95 seconds, 0-60MPH 1.91 seconds
Final drive:	Chain
Chassis and running gear
Frame type:	Twin-spar aluminium deltabox frame, multi-adjustable steering geometry, wheelbase, ride height, with aluminium swingarm
Front suspension:	Fully adjustable Öhlins inverted telescopic forks
Rear suspension:	Braced aluminium swingarm with single Öhlins shock and rising-rate linkage
Front/rear wheels:	MFR forged magnesium 17” inch front and rear
Front/rear tires:	Michelin, 17” front and rear, available as slick, intermedium and wet tires
Front brake:	Twin 320 mm or 340 mm carbon discs with radial mounted four-piston Brembo calipers
Rear brake:	Single 220 mm ventilated stainless steel disc with twin-piston Brembo caliper
Weight:	Minimum 160 kg (353 lb) excluding rider, 200 kg (441 lb) including rider, in accordance with FIM regulations
Fuel capacity:	22 L (6 US gal; 5 imp gal), in accordance with FIM regulations

== Successes ==
These results are accurate up to the 2025 Valencian Community motorcycle Grand Prix.

- World Championship titles:
  - Constructors: 5 (2005, 2008, 2009, 2010, 2015)
  - Riders: 8
    - Valentino Rossi 4 times (2004, 2005, 2008, 2009)
    - Jorge Lorenzo 3 times (2010, 2012, 2015)
    - Fabio Quartararo 1 time (2021)
  - Teams: 7
    - Gauloises Fortuna Yamaha (2004)
    - Gauloises Yamaha Team (2005)
    - Fiat Yamaha Team (2008, 2009, 2010)
    - Movistar Yamaha MotoGP (2015, 2016)
- Races won: 125:

2002: Biaggi 2 (2 in total)
2004: Rossi 9 (9 in total)
2005: Rossi 11 (11 in total)
2006: Rossi 5 (5 in total)
2007: Rossi 4 (4 in total)
2008: Rossi 9, Lorenzo 1 (10 in total)
2009: Rossi 6, Lorenzo 4 (10 in total)
2010: Lorenzo 9, Rossi 2 (11 in total)
2011: Lorenzo 3, Spies 1 (4 in total)
2012: Lorenzo 6 (6 in total)
2013: Lorenzo 8, Rossi 1 (9 in total)
2014: Rossi 2, Lorenzo 2 (4 in total)
2015: Lorenzo 7, Rossi 4 (11 in total)
2016: Lorenzo 4, Rossi2 (6 in total)
2017: Viñales 3, Rossi 1 (4 in total)
2018: Viñales 1 (1 in total)
2019: Viñales 2 (2 in total)
2020: Quartararo 3, Morbidelli 3, Viñales 1 (7 in total)
2021: Quartararo 5, Viñales 1 (6 in total)
2022: Quartararo 3

- Poles: 126:

2002: Biaggi 4, Checa 1 (5 in total)
2004: Rossi 5, Checa 1 (6 in total)
2005: Rossi 5 (5 in total)
2006: Rossi 5 (5 in total)
2007: Rossi 4, Edwards 2 (6 in total)
2008: Lorenzo 4, Rossi 2, Edwards 1 (7 in total)
2009: Rossi 7, Lorenzo 5 (12 in total)
2010: Lorenzo 7, Rossi1, Spies 1 (9 in total)
2011: Lorenzo 2 (2 in total)
2012: Lorenzo 7 (7 in total)
2013: Lorenzo 4, Crutchlow 2 (6 in total)
2014: Rossi 1, Lorenzo 1 (2 in total)
2015: Lorenzo 5, Rossi 1 (6 in total)
2016: Lorenzo 4, Rossi 3 (7 in total)
2017: Viñales 5, Zarco 2 (7 in total)
2018: Zarco 2, Rossi 1, Viñales 1 (4 in total)
2019: Quartararo 6, Viñales 3 (9 in total)
2020: Quartararo 4, Viñales 3, Morbidelli 2 (9 in total)
2021: Quartararo 5, Viñales 1 (6 in total)
2022: Quartararo 1 (1 in total)
2025: Quartararo 5 (5 in total)

== Complete MotoGP results ==
(key) (results in bold indicate pole position; results in italics indicate fastest lap)

Year	Tyres	Team	No.	Rider	1	2	3	4	5	6	7	8	9	10	11	12	13	14	15	16	17	18	Points	RC	Points	TC	Points	MC
2002	M				JPN	RSA	SPA	FRA	ITA	CAT	NED	GBR	GER	CZE	POR	RIO	PAC	MAL	AUS	VAL								
2002	M	(Japan) Marlboro Yamaha Team	3	(Italy) Max Biaggi	Ret	9	DSQ	3	2	**4**	4	2	2	**1**	6	**2**	Ret	1	6	**3**			215	2nd	356	2nd	272	2nd
2002	M	(Japan) Marlboro Yamaha Team	7	(Spain) Carlos Checa	3	5	Ret	Ret	4	3	3	Ret	4	5	**2**	Ret	5	7	11	Ret			141	5th	356	2nd	272	2nd
2002	M	(Japan) Marlboro Yamaha Team	45	(Japan) Wataru Yoshikawa													12						4	25th	—N/a		272	2nd
2002	M	(Spain) Antena 3 Yamaha d'Antin	6	(Japan) Norifumi Abe															DNS	10			6 (129) (Note: Non-bracketed number refers to the number accumulated with the motorcycle, with number in brackets referring to the total accumulated for the season.)	6th	142	6th	272	2nd
2002	M	(France) Gauloises Yamaha Tech 3	19	(France) Olivier Jacque														Ret	8	9			15 (81)	10th	149	5th	272	2nd
2002	M	(France) Gauloises Yamaha Tech 3	56	(Japan) Shinya Nakano														6	13	6			23 (68)	11th	149	5th	272	2nd
2003	M				JPN	RSA	SPA	FRA	ITA	CAT	NED	GBR	GER	CZE	POR	RIO	PAC	MAL	AUS	VAL								
2003	M	(France) Gauloises Yamaha Team	4	(Brazil) Alex Barros	8	5	5	3	Ret	8	8	DNS	Ret	7	11	12	6	15	Ret	6			101	9th	172	6th	175	3rd
2003	M	(France) Gauloises Yamaha Team	19	(France) Olivier Jacque	15	10	10	4	10	Ret	5	Ret	9	11	13	Ret	13	DNS	6	Ret			71	12th	172	6th	175	3rd
2003	M	(Japan) Fortuna Yamaha Team	7	(Spain) Carlos Checa	10	9	Ret	Ret	8	4	4	6	8	4	8	9	Ret	5	8	5			123	7th	188	5th	175	3rd
2003	M	(Japan) Fortuna Yamaha Team	33	(Italy) Marco Melandri	WD		17	15	11	13	Ret	Ret	Ret	10	7	11	5	11	Ret				45	15th	188	5th	175	3rd
2003	M	(Japan) Fortuna Yamaha Team	17	(Japan) Norifumi Abe	11	8														9			20 (31)	16th	188	5th	175	3rd
2003	M	(Japan) Yamaha Racing Team	17	(Japan) Norifumi Abe				11					10										11 (31)	16th	—N/a		175	3rd
2003	M	(Spain) d'Antin Yamaha Team	56	(Japan) Shinya Nakano	9	11	8	14	5	5	13	9	7	14	12	8	9	8	7	Ret			101	10th	101	8th	175	3rd
2004	M				RSA	SPA	FRA	ITA	CAT	NED	RIO	GER	GBR	CZE	POR	JPN	QAT	MAL	AUS	VAL								
2004	M	(Japan) Gauloises Fortuna Yamaha	7	(Spain) Carlos Checa	10	6	2	Ret	4	9	10	Ret	6	6	5	7	**Ret**	9	10	4			117	7th	421	1st	328	2nd
2004	M	(Japan) Gauloises Fortuna Yamaha	46	(Italy) Valentino Rossi	**1**	**4**	4	1	1	**1**	Ret	4	**1**	2	1	2	Ret	**1**	1	1			304	1st	421	1st	328	2nd
2004	M	(France) Fortuna Gauloises Tech 3	17	(Japan) Norifumi Abe	9	11	Ret	7	9	11	8	Ret	Ret	8	10	Ret	7	12	17	10			74	13th	149	6th	328	2nd
2004	M	(France) Fortuna Gauloises Tech 3	33	(Italy) Marco Melandri	11	Ret	6	9	3	3	13	Ret		9	Ret	5	Ret	Ret	Ret	Ret			75	12th	149	6th	328	2nd
2005	M				SPA	POR	CHN	FRA	ITA	CAT	NED	USA	GBR	GER	CZE	JPN	MAL	QAT	AUS	TUR	VAL							
2005	M	(Japan) Gauloises Yamaha Team (Note: Due to tobacco advertising, the team was known as Yamaha Factory Racing at the United States and Valencian Grands Prix.)	5	(United States) Colin Edwards	9	6	8	3	9	7	3	2	4	8	7	6	10	4	6	7	8		179	4th	546	1st	381	1st
2005	M	(Japan) Gauloises Yamaha Team	46	(Italy) Valentino Rossi	**1**	2	1	**1**	**1**	1	**1**	3	**1**	1	1	Ret	2	1	1	2	3		367	1st	546	1st	381	1st
2005	M	(France) Fortuna Yamaha Team	11	(Spain) Rubén Xaus	18	10	10	12	14	10	12	11	Ret	13	18	10	15	14	12	14	15		52	16th	130	7th	381	1st
2005	M	(France) Fortuna Yamaha Team	24	(Spain) Toni Elías	12	14	14	9				13	9	12	14	9	11	8	9	6	10		74	12th	130	7th	381	1st
2005	M	(France) Fortuna Yamaha Team	94	(Spain) David Checa					19	13	15												4	26th	130	7th	381	1st
2006					SPA	QAT	TUR	CHN	FRA	ITA	CAT	NED	GBR	GER	USA	CZE	MAL	AUS	JPN	POR	VAL							
2006	M	(Japan) Camel Yamaha Team	5	(United States) Colin Edwards	11	9	9	3	6	12	5	13	6	12	9	10	10	Ret	8	4	9		124	7th	371	2nd	289	2nd
2006	M	(Japan) Camel Yamaha Team	46	(Italy) Valentino Rossi	14	1	4	Ret	Ret	1	**1**	8	2	1	Ret	**2**	**1**	3	2	**2**	**13**		**247**	**2nd**	371	2nd	289	2nd
2006	D	(France) Tech 3 Yamaha	7	(Spain) Carlos Checa	13	12	15	14	11	15	8	9	10	9	7	15	12	Ret	14	7	10		75	15th	101	9th	289	2nd
2006	D	(France) Tech 3 Yamaha	77	(United Kingdom) James Ellison	16	13	18	16	14	16	9	Ret	14	13	13	17	16	16	15	13	14		26	18th	101	9th	289	2nd
2007					QAT	SPA	TUR	CHN	FRA	ITA	CAT	GBR	NED	GER	USA	CZE	RSM	POR	JPN	AUS	MAL	VAL						
2007	M	(Japan) FIAT Yamaha Team	5	(United States) Colin Edwards	6	3	Ret	11	**12**	12	10	**2**	6	4	11	Ret	9	10	14	9	10	13	124	9th	365	4th	283	3rd
2007	M	(Japan) FIAT Yamaha Team	46	(Italy) Valentino Rossi	**2**	1	**10**	**2**	6	1	**2**	4	1	Ret	4	7	Ret	1	13	3	5	Ret	**241**	**3rd**	365	4th	283	3rd
2007	D	(France) Dunlop Yamaha Tech 3	6	(Japan) Makoto Tamada	16	14	14	Ret	9	15	12	15	13	13	8	17	14	Ret	12	16	18	15	38	18th	88	8th	283	3rd
2007	D	(France) Dunlop Yamaha Tech 3	50	(France) Sylvain Guintoli	15	15	15	13	10	14	14	16	14	Ret	13	13	12	14	4	14	19	11	50	16th	88	8th	283	3rd
2008					QAT	ESP	POR	CHN	FRA	ITA	CAT	GBR	NED	GER	USA	CZE	RSM	IND	JPN	AUS	MAL	VAL						
2008	M	(France) Tech 3 Yamaha	5	(United States) Colin Edwards	7	Ret	4	**7**	3	5	5	4	3	Ret	14	14	10	15	7	8	8	6	144	7th	249	4th	402	1st
2008	M	(France) Tech 3 Yamaha	52	(United Kingdom) James Toseland	6	6	7	12	Ret	6	6	17	9	11	9	13	6	18	11	6	Ret	11	105	11th	249	4th	402	1st
2008	B	(Japan) Fiat Yamaha Team	46	(Italy) Valentino Rossi	5	2	3	1	1	**1**	2	2	11	2	1	1	1	**1**	1	2	1	3	**373**	**1st**	563	1st	402	1st
2008	M	(Japan) Fiat Yamaha Team	48	(Spain) Jorge Lorenzo	**2**	**3**	**1**	4	2	Ret		6	6	Ret	Ret	10	2	3	**4**	4	Ret	8	190	4th	563	1st	402	1st
2009	B				QAT	JPN	SPA	FRA	ITA	CAT	NED	USA	GER	GBR	CZE	IND	RSM	POR	AUS	MAL	VAL							
2009	B	(France) Monster Yamaha Tech 3	5	(United States) Colin Edwards	4	12	7	7	6	7	4	7	9	2	7	5	Ret	5	5	13	4		161	5th	253	4th	386	1st
2009	B	(France) Monster Yamaha Tech 3	52	(United Kingdom) James Toseland	16	9	13	9	7	13	6	DSQ	10	6	9	6	10	9	14	15	12		92	14th	253	4th	386	1st
2009	B	(Japan) Sterilgarda Yamaha Team	11	(United States) Ben Spies																	7		9	20th	—N/a		386	1st
2009	B	(Japan) Fiat Yamaha Team	46	(Italy) Valentino Rossi	2	**2**	1	16	3	1	**1**	2	**1**	**5**	**1**	Ret	**1**	4	2	**3**	2		**306**	**1st**	567	1st	386	1st
2009	B	(Japan) Fiat Yamaha Team	99	(Spain) Jorge Lorenzo	3	1	**Ret**	1	**2**	**2**	2	**3**	2	Ret	Ret	1	2	**1**	Ret	4	3		**261**	**2nd**	567	1st	386	1st
2010	B				QAT	ESP	FRA	ITA	GBR	NED	CAT	GER	USA	CZE	IND	RSM	ARA	JPN	MAL	AUS	POR	VAL						
2010	B	(France) Monster Yamaha Tech 3	5	(United States) Colin Edwards	8	12	12	13	9	8	11	Ret	7	7	Ret	7	12	5	NC	7	7	12	103	11th	279	4th	404	1st
2010	B	(France) Monster Yamaha Tech 3	11	(United States) Ben Spies	5	Ret	Ret	7	3	4	6	8	6	4	**2**	6	5	8	4	5	DNS	4	176	6th	279	4th	404	1st
2010	B	(Japan) Fiat Yamaha Team	8	(Japan) Wataru Yoshikawa							15												1	22nd	617	1st	404	1st
2010	B	(Japan) Fiat Yamaha Team	46	(Italy) Valentino Rossi	1	3	**2**	DNS				4	3	5	4	3	6	3	1	3	2	3	**233**	**3rd**	617	1st	404	1st
2010	B	(Japan) Fiat Yamaha Team	99	(Spain) Jorge Lorenzo	2	1	1	2	**1**	**1**	**1**	**2**	**1**	1	3	2	4	4	**3**	2	**1**	1	**383**	**1st**	617	1st	404	1st

Year	Tyres	Team	No.	Rider	1	2	3	4	5	6	7	8	9	10	11	12	13	14	15	16	17	18	19	Points	RC	Points	TC	Points	MC
2011	B				QAT	ESP	POR	FRA	CAT	GBR	NED	ITA	GER	USA	CZE	IND	RSM	ARA	JPN	AUS	MAL	VAL							
2011	B	(Japan) Yamaha Factory Racing	1	(Spain) Jorge Lorenzo	2	1	**2**	4	2	Ret	6	1	2	**2**	4	4	1	3	2	DNS				260	2nd	446	2nd	325	2nd
2011	B	(Japan) Yamaha Factory Racing	11	(United States) Ben Spies	6	Ret	Ret	6	3	Ret	1	4	5	4	5	3	6	5	6	DNS	C	2		176	5th	446	2nd	325	2nd
2011	B	(Japan) Yamaha Factory Racing	89	(Japan) Katsuyuki Nakasuga																	C	6		10	18th	446	2nd	325	2nd
2011	B	(France) Monster Yamaha Tech 3	5	(United States) Colin Edwards	8	Ret	6	13	DNS	3	7	9	10	8	8	7	13	13	8	5	C			109	9th	188	5th	325	2nd
2011	B	(France) Monster Yamaha Tech 3	35	(United Kingdom) Cal Crutchlow	11	8	8	Ret	7	DNS	14	Ret	14	Ret	Ret	11	10	9	11	Ret	C	4		70	12th	188	5th	325	2nd
2011	B	(France) Monster Yamaha Tech 3	41	(United States) Josh Hayes																		7		9	19th	188	5th	325	2nd
2012	B				QAT	ESP	POR	FRA	CAT	GBR	NED	GER	ITA	USA	IND	CZE	RSM	ARA	JPN	MAL	AUS	VAL							
2012	B	(France) Monster Yamaha Tech 3	4	(Italy) Andrea Dovizioso	5	5	4	7	3	19	3	3	3	4	3	4	4	3	4	13	4	6		218	4th	369	3rd	386	2nd
2012	B	(France) Monster Yamaha Tech 3	35	(United Kingdom) Cal Crutchlow	4	4	5	8	5	6	5	8	6	5	Ret	3	Ret	4	Ret	Ret	3	Ret		151	7th	369	3rd	386	2nd
2012	B	(Japan) Yamaha Factory Racing	11	(United States) Ben Spies	11	11	8	16	10	5	4	4	11	Ret	Ret	Ret	5	5	Ret	Ret				88	10th	458	2nd	386	2nd
2012	B	(Japan) Yamaha Factory Racing	99	(Spain) Jorge Lorenzo	**1**	**2**	2	1	1	1	Ret	2	1	**2**	2	**2**	1	**2**	**2**	**2**	2	Ret		350	1st	458	2nd	386	2nd
2012	B	(Japan) Yamaha Factory Racing	21	(Japan) Katsuyuki Nakasuga																		2		20 (27)	18th	458	2nd	386	2nd
2012	B	(Japan) Yamaha YSP Racing Team	21	(Japan) Katsuyuki Nakasuga															9					7 (27)	18th	—N/a		386	2nd
2013	B				QAT	AME	ESP	FRA	ITA	CAT	NED	GER	USA	IND	CZE	GBR	RSM	ARA	MAL	AUS	JPN	VAL							
2013	B	(Japan) Yamaha YSP Racing Team	21	(Japan) Katsuyuki Nakasuga																	11			5	22nd	—N/a		381	2nd
2013	B	(France) Monster Yamaha Tech 3	35	(United Kingdom) Cal Crutchlow	5	4	5	2	3	Ret	**3**	2	7	5	**17**	7	6	6	6	4	7	Ret		188	5th	304	3rd	381	2nd
2013	B	(France) Monster Yamaha Tech 3	38	(United Kingdom) Bradley Smith	Ret	12	10	9	9	6	9	6	Ret	8	Ret	9	11	7	7	6	8	7		116	10th	304	3rd	381	2nd
2013	B	(Japan) Yamaha Factory Racing	46	(Italy) Valentino Rossi	2	6	4	12	Ret	4	1	3	3	4	4	4	4	3	4	3	6	4		237	4th	567	2nd	381	2nd
2013	B	(Japan) Yamaha Factory Racing	99	(Spain) Jorge Lorenzo	**1**	3	**3**	7	1	1	5	DNS	6	3	3	1	1	2	3	**1**	**1**	1		330	2nd	567	2nd	381	2nd
2014	B				QAT	AME	ARG	ESP	FRA	ITA	CAT	NED	GER	IND	CZE	GBR	RSM	ARA	JPN	AUS	MAL	VAL							
2014	B	(Japan) Yamalube Racing Team with YSP	21	(Japan) Katsuyuki Nakasuga															12					4	26th	—N/a		354	2nd
2014	B	(France) Monster Yamaha Tech 3	38	(United Kingdom) Bradley Smith	Ret	5	7	8	10	Ret	10	8	19	6	9	22	7	5	9	3	5	14		121	8th	257	4th	354	2nd
2014	B	(France) Monster Yamaha Tech 3	44	(Spain) Pol Espargaró	Ret	6	8	9	4	5	7	Ret	7	5	Ret	6	6	6	8	Ret	6	6		136	6th	257	4th	354	2nd
2014	B	(Japan) Movistar Yamaha MotoGP	46	(Italy) Valentino Rossi	2	8	4	2	2	3	2	5	4	3	3	3	1	Ret	3	1	2	**2**		**295**	**2nd**	558	2nd	354	2nd
2014	B	(Japan) Movistar Yamaha MotoGP	99	(Spain) Jorge Lorenzo	Ret	10	3	4	6	2	4	13	3	2	2	2	**2**	1	1	2	3	Ret		263	3rd	558	2nd	354	2nd
2015	B				QAT	AME	ARG	SPA	FRA	ITA	CAT	NED	GER	IND	CZE	GBR	RSM	ARA	JPN	AUS	MAL	VAL							
2015	B	(Japan) Yamaha Factory Racing Team	21	(Japan) Katsuyuki Nakasuga															8					8	23rd	—N/a		407	1st
2015	B	(France) Monster Yamaha Tech 3	38	(United Kingdom) Bradley Smith	8	6	6	8	6	5	5	7	6	6	7	7	2	8	7	10	4	6		181	6th	295	4th	407	1st
2015	B	(France) Monster Yamaha Tech 3	44	(Spain) Pol Espargaró	9	Ret	8	5	7	6	Ret	5	8	7	8	Ret	Ret	9	Ret	8	9	5		114	9th	295	4th	407	1st
2015	B	(Japan) Movistar Yamaha MotoGP	46	(Italy) Valentino Rossi	1	3	1	3	2	3	2	**1**	3	3	3	1	5	3	2	4	3	4		325	2nd	655	1st	407	1st
2015	B	(Japan) Movistar Yamaha MotoGP	99	(Spain) Jorge Lorenzo	4	4	5	**1**	1	1	1	3	4	2	**1**	4	**Ret**	1	**3**	2	2	**1**		330	1st	655	1st	407	1st
2016	M				QAT	ARG	AME	ESP	FRA	ITA	CAT	NED	GER	AUT	CZE	GBR	RSM	ARA	JPN	AUS	MAL	VAL							
2016	M	(Japan) Yamalube Yamaha Factory Racing Team	21	(Japan) Katsuyuki Nakasuga															11					5	23rd	—N/a		353	2nd
2016	M	(France) Monster Yamaha Tech 3	22	(United Kingdom) Alex Lowes												13	Ret	DNS						3	24th	199	5th	353	2nd
2016	M	(France) Monster Yamaha Tech 3	38	(United Kingdom) Bradley Smith	8	8	17	12	Ret	7	Ret	13	13	9	Ret				13	8	14	9		62	17th	199	5th	353	2nd
2016	M	(France) Monster Yamaha Tech 3	44	(Spain) Pol Espargaró	7	6	7	8	5	15	5	4	Ret	10	13	DNS	9	8	6	5	9	6		134	8th	199	5th	353	2nd
2016	M	(Japan) Movistar Yamaha MotoGP	46	(Italy) Valentino Rossi	4	2	Ret	**1**	2	**Ret**	1	Ret	8	4	2	3	2	3	**Ret**	2	2	4		249	2nd	482	1st	353	2nd
2016	M	(Japan) Movistar Yamaha MotoGP	99	(Spain) Jorge Lorenzo	**1**	Ret	2	2	**1**	1	Ret	10	15	3	17	8	**3**	2	Ret	6	3	**1**		233	3rd	482	1st	353	2nd
2017	M				QAT	ARG	AME	ESP	FRA	ITA	CAT	NED	GER	CZE	AUT	GBR	RSM	ARA	JPN	AUS	MAL	VAL							
2017	M	(France) Monster Yamaha Tech 3	5	(France) Johann Zarco	Ret	5	5	4	2	7	5	**14**	9	12	5	6	15	9	**8**	4	3	2		174	6th	258	4th	321	2nd
2017	M	(France) Monster Yamaha Tech 3	23	(Australia) Broc Parkes																22				0	NC	258	4th	321	2nd
2017	M	(France) Monster Yamaha Tech 3	31	(Japan) Kohta Nozane															Ret					0	NC	258	4th	321	2nd
2017	M	(France) Monster Yamaha Tech 3	60	(Netherlands) Michael van der Mark																	16	17		0	NC	258	4th	321	2nd
2017	M	(France) Monster Yamaha Tech 3	94	(Germany) Jonas Folger	10	6	11	8	7	13	6	Ret	2	10	Ret	DNS	9	16						84	10th	258	4th	321	2nd
2017	M	(Japan) Yamalube Yamaha Factory Racing Team	21	(Japan) Katsuyuki Nakasuga															12					4	26th	—N/a		321	2nd
2017	M	(Japan) Movistar Yamaha MotoGP	25	(Spain) Maverick Viñales	**1**	1	Ret	6	**1**	**2**	10	Ret	4	3	6	2	**4**	**4**	9	3	9	12		230	3rd	438	2nd	321	2nd
2017	M	(Japan) Movistar Yamaha MotoGP	46	(Italy) Valentino Rossi	3	2	2	10	Ret	4	8	1	5	4	7	3		5	Ret	2	7	5		208	5th	438	2nd	321	2nd
2018	M				QAT	ARG	AME	ESP	FRA	ITA	CAT	NED	GER	CZE	AUT	GBR	RSM	ARA	THA	JPN	AUS	MAL	VAL						
2018	M	(France) Monster Yamaha Tech 3	5	(France) Johann Zarco	**8**	2	6	2	**Ret**	10	7	8	9	7	9	C	10	14	5	6	Ret	3	7	158	6th	204	6th	281	3rd
2018	M	(France) Monster Yamaha Tech 3	55	(Malaysia) Hafizh Syahrin	14	9	Ret	16	12	12	Ret	18	11	14	16	C	19	18	12	10	Ret	10	10	46	16th	204	6th	281	3rd
2018	M	(Japan) Movistar Yamaha MotoGP	25	(Spain) Maverick Viñales	6	5	2	7	7	8	6	3	3	Ret	12	C	5	10	3	7	1	4	**Ret**	193	4th	391	3rd	281	3rd
2018	M	(Japan) Movistar Yamaha MotoGP	46	(Italy) Valentino Rossi	3	19	4	5	3	**3**	3	5	2	4	6	C	7	8	4	4	6	18	13	198	3rd	391	3rd	281	3rd
2018	M	(Japan) Yamalube Yamaha Factory Racing Team	89	(Japan) Katsuyuki Nakasuga																14				2	26th	—N/a		281	3rd
2019	M				QAT	ARG	AME	ESP	FRA	ITA	CAT	NED	GER	CZE	AUT	GBR	RSM	ARA	THA	JPN	AUS	MAL	VAL						
2019	M	(Japan) Monster Energy Yamaha MotoGP	12	(Spain) Maverick Viñales	**7**	Ret	11	3	Ret	6	Ret	1	2	10	5	3	**3**	4	3	4	**Ret**	1	6	211	3rd	385	3rd	321	2nd
2019	M	(Japan) Monster Energy Yamaha MotoGP	46	(Italy) Valentino Rossi	5	2	2	6	5	Ret	Ret	Ret	8	6	4	4	4	8	8	Ret	8	4	8	174	7th	385	3rd	321	2nd
2019	M	(Malaysia) Petronas Yamaha SRT	20	(France) Fabio Quartararo	16	8	7	**Ret**	8	10	**2**	**3**	Ret	7	3	Ret	2	5	**2**	2	Ret	**7**	**2**	192	5th	307	4th	321	2nd
2019	M	(Malaysia) Petronas Yamaha SRT	21	(Italy) Franco Morbidelli	11	Ret	5	7	7	Ret	Ret	5	9	Ret	10	5	5	Ret	6	6	11	6	Ret	115	10th	307	4th	321	2nd
2020	M				SPA	ANC	CZE	AUT	STY	RSM	EMI	CAT	FRA	ARA	TER	EUR	VAL	POR											
2020	M	(Japan) Monster Energy Yamaha MotoGP	12	(Spain) Maverick Viñales	2	2	14	**10**	Ret	**6**	**1**	9	10	4	7	13	10	11						132	6th	178 (Note: Monster Energy Yamaha MotoGP riders scored 198 points, but the team was deducted 20 points after failing to respect MSMA technical changes protocols.)	6th	204 (Note: Yamaha scored 254 points as a manufacturer, but were deducted 50 points after failing to respect MSMA technical changes protocols.)	2nd
2020	M	(Japan) Monster Energy Yamaha MotoGP	31	(United States) Garrett Gerloff												WD (Note: Garrett Gerloff initially replaced Valentino Rossi during round 12 and competed in the two Friday practice sessions while Rossi was waiting for his COVID-19 test results, but was withdrawn from the race when Rossi was declared fit to race after testing negative for COVID-19.)								0	NC	178	6th	204	2nd
2020	M	(Japan) Monster Energy Yamaha MotoGP	46	(Italy) Valentino Rossi	Ret	3	5	5	9	4	Ret	Ret	Ret			Ret	12	12						66	15th	178	6th	204	2nd
2020	M	(Malaysia) Petronas Yamaha SRT	20	(France) Fabio Quartararo	**1**	**1**	7	8	13	Ret	4	1	**9**	**18**	8	14	Ret	14						127	8th	248 (Note: Petronas Yamaha SRT riders scored 285 points, but the team was deducted 37 points after failing to respect MSMA technical changes protocols.)	2nd	204	2nd
2020	M	(Malaysia) Petronas Yamaha SRT	21	(Italy) Franco Morbidelli	5	Ret	2	Ret	15	1	9	**4**	Ret	6	1	11	**1**	3						158	2nd	248	2nd	204	2nd

Year	Tyres	Team	No.	Rider	1	2	3	4	5	6	7	8	9	10	11	12	13	14	15	16	17	18	19	20	21	22	Points	RC	Points	TC	Points	MC
2021	M				QAT	DOH	POR	SPA	FRA	ITA	CAT	GER	NED	STY	AUT	GBR	ARA	RSM	AME	EMI	ALR	VAL										
2021	M	(Japan) Monster Energy Yamaha MotoGP	12	(Spain) Maverick Viñales	1	5	11	7	10	8	5	19	**2**	NC													95 (106)	10th	380	2nd	309	2nd
2021	M	(Japan) Monster Energy Yamaha MotoGP	20	(France) Fabio Quartararo	5	1	**1**	**13**	**3**	**1**	**6**	3	1	3	7	1	8	2	2	4	Ret	5					267	1st	380	2nd	309	2nd
2021	M	(Japan) Monster Energy Yamaha MotoGP	35	(United Kingdom) Cal Crutchlow												17	16										0	28th	380	2nd	309	2nd
2021	M	(Japan) Monster Energy Yamaha MotoGP	21	(Italy) Franco Morbidelli														18	19	14	17	11					7 (47)	17th	380	2nd	309	2nd
2021	M	(Malaysia) Petronas Yamaha SRT	21	(Italy) Franco Morbidelli	18	12	4	3	16	16	9	18															40 (47)	17th	96	10th	309	2nd
2021	M	(Malaysia) Petronas Yamaha SRT	04	(Italy) Andrea Dovizioso														21	13	13	13	12					12	24th	96	10th	309	2nd
2021	M	(Malaysia) Petronas Yamaha SRT	31	(United States) Garrett Gerloff									17														0	29th	96	10th	309	2nd
2021	M	(Malaysia) Petronas Yamaha SRT	35	(United Kingdom) Cal Crutchlow										17	17												0	28th	96	10th	309	2nd
2021	M	(Malaysia) Petronas Yamaha SRT	46	(Italy) Valentino Rossi	12	16	Ret	16	11	10	Ret	14	Ret	13	8	18	19	17	15	10	13	10					44	18th	96	10th	309	2nd
2021	M	(Malaysia) Petronas Yamaha SRT	96	(United Kingdom) Jake Dixon												19	Ret										0	28th	96	10th	309	2nd
2022	M				QAT	INA	ARG	AME	POR	SPA	FRA	ITA	CAT	GER	NED	GBR	AUT	RSM	ARA	JPN	THA	AUS	MAL	VAL								
2022	M	(Japan) Monster Energy Yamaha MotoGP	20	(France) Fabio Quartararo	9	**2**	8	7	**1**	**2**	4	2	**1**	**1**	Ret	8	2	5	Ret	8	17	Ret	3	4			248	2nd	290	5th	256	2nd
2022	M	(Japan) Monster Energy Yamaha MotoGP	21	(Italy) Franco Morbidelli	11	7	Ret	16	13	15	15	17	13	13	Ret	15	Ret	Ret	17	14	13	Ret	11	14			42	19th	290	5th	256	2nd
2022	M	(Malaysia) WithU Yamaha RNF MotoGP Team	04	(Italy) Andrea Dovizioso	14	Ret	20	15	11	17	16	20	Ret	14	16	16	15	12									15	21st	37	11th	256	2nd
2022	M	(Malaysia) WithU Yamaha RNF MotoGP Team	35	(United Kingdom) Cal Crutchlow															14	15	19	13	12	16			10	25th	37	11th	256	2nd
2022	M	(Malaysia) WithU Yamaha RNF MotoGP Team	40	(South Africa) Darryn Binder	16	10	18	22	17	Ret	17	16	12	Ret	Ret	20	Ret	16	18	Ret	21	14	Ret	Ret			12	24th	37	11th	256	2nd
2023	M				POR	ARG	AME	SPA	FRA	ITA	GER	NED	GBR	AUT	CAT	RSM	IND	JPN	INA	AUS	THA	MAL	QAT	VAL								
2023	M	(Japan) Monster Energy Yamaha MotoGP	20	(France) Fabio Quartararo	8	7^{9}	3	10	7	11	13	Ret^{3}	15	8	7	13	3^{6}	10	3^{5}	14	5	5	7^{8}	11			172	10th	274	7th	196	4th
2023	M	(Japan) Monster Energy Yamaha MotoGP	21	(Italy) Franco Morbidelli	14	4^{4}	8	11	10	10	12	9	14	11^{9}	14	15	7	17	14	17	11	7	16	7			102	13th	274	7th	196	4th
2023	M	(Japan) Yamalube RS4GP Racing Team	35	(United Kingdom) Cal Crutchlow														13									—N/a	—N/a	—N/a	—N/a	196	4th
2024	M				QAT	POR	AME	SPA	FRA	CAT	ITA	NED	GER	GBR	AUT	CAT	RSM	EMI	INA	JPN	AUS	THA	MAL	SLD								
2024	M	(Japan) Monster Energy Yamaha MotoGP Team	20	(France) Fabio Quartararo	11	7^{9}	12	15^{5}	Ret	9	18	12^{7}	11	11	18	Ret	7^{9}	7^{7}	7	12	9	16	6^{5}	11			113	13th	144	8th	124	4th
2024	M	(Japan) Monster Energy Yamaha MotoGP Team	42	(Spain) Álex Rins	16	13	Ret	13	15	20	15	Ret		DNS	16	9	19	DNS	11	16	13	Ret	8	21			31	18th	144	8th	124	4th
2024	M	(Japan) Monster Energy Yamaha MotoGP Team	87	(Australia) Remy Gardner									19	18													0	26th	144	8th	124	4th
2024	M	(Japan) Yamaha Factory Racing Team	87	(Australia) Remy Gardner																17							—N/a	—N/a	—N/a	—N/a	124	4th
2025	M				THA	ARG	AME	QAT	SPA	FRA	GBR	ARA	ITA	NED	GER	CZE	AUT	HUN	CAT	RSM	JPN	INA	AUS	MAL	POR	VAL						
2025	M	(Japan) Monster Energy Yamaha MotoGP Team	20	(France) Fabio Quartararo	15^{7}	14	10^{6}	7^{5}	**2**	**Ret**^{4}	**Ret**^{7}	Ret	14	**10**	4^{3}	6^{5}	15	10	5^{2}	8	8^{6}	7	**11**^{7}	5^{5}	6^{4}	Ret^{7}	201	9th	269	6th	247	5th
2025	M	(Japan) Monster Energy Yamaha MotoGP Team	42	(Spain) Álex Rins	17	11	11	12	13	12^{8}	13	11	15	13	10	15	16	13	Ret	Ret	18	10	7	13	13	14	68	19th	269	6th	247	5th
2025	M	(Japan) Yamaha Factory Racing Team	7	(Spain) Augusto Fernández								13				18				14				18		16	8	25th	—N/a	—N/a	247	5th
2025	M	(Italy) Prima Pramac Yamaha MotoGP	7	(Spain) Augusto Fernández			13	Ret	16																		8	25th	125	11th	247	5th
2025	M	(Italy) Prima Pramac Yamaha MotoGP	43	(Australia) Jack Miller	11	13	5	Ret	Ret	Ret	7^{9}	14	Ret	14	8^{5}	10	18	Ret	14	12	Ret	14	Ret^{4}	14	12	9	79	17th	125	11th	247	5th
2025	M	(Italy) Prima Pramac Yamaha MotoGP	88	(Portugal) Miguel Oliveira	14	DNS				Ret	16	15	13	Ret	Ret	17	17	12	9	9	14	11^{9}	12	19	14	11	43	20th	125	11th	247	5th
2026	M				THA	BRA	USA	SPA	FRA	CAT	ITA	HUN	CZE	NED	GER	GBR	ARA	RSM	AUT	JPN	INA	AUS	MAL	QAT	POR	VAL						
2026	M	(Japan) Monster Energy Yamaha MotoGP Team	20	(France) Fabio Quartararo	14	16^{6}	17	14^{7}	6^{5}	5	18	Ret	Ret	8	7**^{9}**	16	18	10	17	12**^{9}**	9**^{9}**	C	11	DNA			79*	14th*	109*	9th*	105*	5th*
2026	M	(Japan) Monster Energy Yamaha MotoGP Team	42	(Spain) Álex Rins	15	14	18	16	12	14	Ret	13	Ret	9	14	Ret	13	Ret	19	16	15	C	12	DNA			29*	20th*	109*	9th*	105*	5th*
2026	M	(Japan) Yamaha Factory Racing Team	47	(Spain) Augusto Fernández				20		12				15		15											6*	24th*	—N/a	—N/a	105*	5th*
2026	M	(Italy) Prima Pramac Yamaha MotoGP	07	(Turkey) Toprak Razgatlıoğlu	17	17	15	19	13	16	16	11	14	Ret	15	14	Ret	12	20	17	Ret			DNA			18*	22nd*	49*	11th*	105*	5th*
2026	M	(Italy) Prima Pramac Yamaha MotoGP	47	(Spain) Augusto Fernández																		C	Ret				0 (6)*	NC (24th)*	49*	11th*	105*	5th*
2026	M	(Italy) Prima Pramac Yamaha MotoGP	43	(Australia) Jack Miller	18	Ret	16	18	15	15	15	8	16	12	12	12	11	Ret	21	19	Ret	C**^{7}**	16	DNA			31*	19th*	49*	11th*	105*	5th*

== See also ==
- Aprilia RS-GP
- Honda RC213V
- Suzuki GSX-RR
- KTM RC16
- Ducati Desmosedici
- Kawasaki Ninja ZX-RR
