= V3 engine =

Type of internal combustion engine

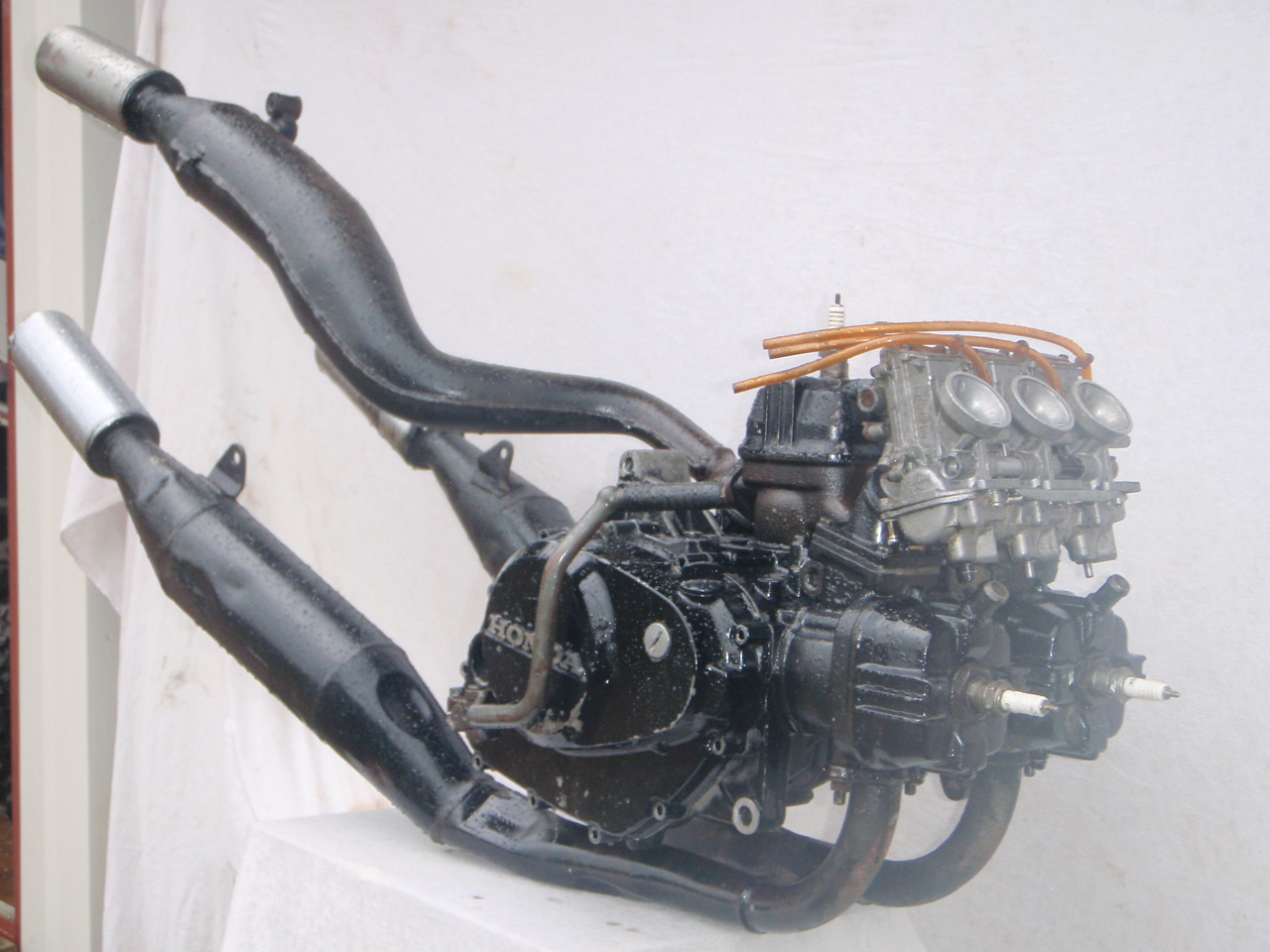
Honda MVX250F two-stroke engine

The V3 engine is a V engine with two cylinders in one bank and one cylinder in the other bank. It is a rare configuration, which has been mostly used in two-stroke engines for motorcycles competing in Grand Prix motorcycle racing.

The first example was the 1955 DKW RM 350. The 1968 Suzuki RP68 was intended to compete in the 1968 season, however a rule change mandating single-cylinder engines meant that the 50 cc (3.1 cu in) RP68 never raced.

Honda later revived the layout for the 1982–1984 NS500/NSR500 Grand Prix racing motorcycles. The 1983–1984 MVX250F and 1985–1987 NS400R sports bikes also used V3 engines. In November 2024, Honda showed a prototype of a newly developed V3 engine paired to an electric supercharger. In the following year, the engine was mounted in the V3R 900 E-Compressor prototype.

A related layout was the W3 engine, although this placed all three cylinders in the same plane, but none of them in the same bank. This was used for the 1905–1915 four-stroke Anzani engine, which was used in motorcycle and aircraft applications.

== See also ==
- W3 engine
