= Brighton Ballet Theater =

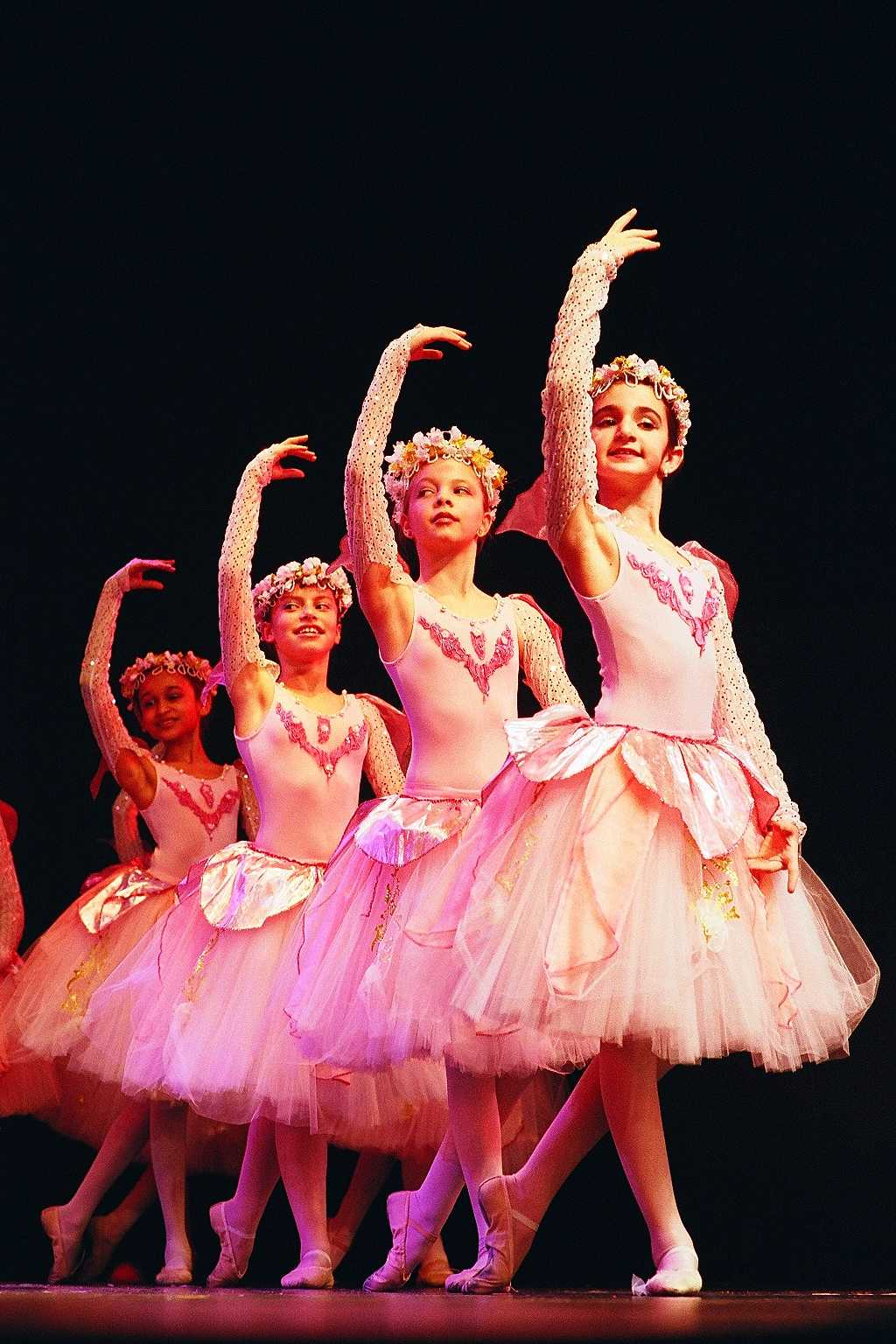
Students of Brighton Ballet Theater - American School of Russian Ballet

Brighton Ballet Theater is an American School of Russian Ballet and a nonprofit dance organization. Established in 1987, it is situated in Manhattan Beach area of Brooklyn and located on the campus of Kingsborough Community College of the City University of New York.

== Overview ==
Three hundred students are enrolled and an additional five hundred students participate through programs in New York City public schools. Brighton Ballet Theater instructors are professionally trained dancers who studied in Russian, Ukrainian or American institutions. In addition, the instructors have performing, teaching and choreographing experience at ballet companies of the former Soviet Union, and the USA.

Each year Brighton Ballet Theater holds two large-scale productions and countless presentations at various special events in the Tri-state area. The school hosts the Annual Children's Festival, "The World of Dance," and performances of The Nutcracker (VIDEO) at the Leon M. Goldstein Performing Arts Center

Brighton Ballet Theater also has a Summer Dance Programs, A la carte, and Summer Intensive Program, held in June through August of every year.

== Selected productions ==
- Ballet Carlson who lives on the Roof, 1992
- Ballet Les Sylphides, 1993, and 1999
- Ballet In the Snow Queen Kingdom, 1993
- Ballet Classical Symphony, 1997
- Grand Pas from the ballet Paquita, 1997
- Excerpts from the ballet: The Sleeping Beauty 1998
- Excerpts from the ballet Coppélia, 2000
- Ballet The Four Seasons, 2002
- Ballet The Radish, 2002 - VIDEO
- Ballet The Nanny's Story on the music by Pyotr Tchaikovsky, 2003 - VIDEO
- Ballet The Ugly Duckling, 2004 - VIDEO
- Ballet The Sunrise, 2005 - VIDEO
- Ballet The Orchestra, 2006
- Ballet Aria, 2007
- "The Kingdom of the Shades" from Petipa's ballet La Bayadère, 2008
- Grand Pas Classique from ballet Paquita, 2008
- Ballet "The Sunrise", 2009
- Ballet "The Four Seasons", 2009
- Ballet "The Enormous Turnip", 2009
- Ballet "The Ugly Duckling", 2010
- Ballet "The Four Seasons" (by Vivaldi), 2011
- Ballet "The White Swans", 2011
- "Déjà Vu" (Bach), 2011
- BBT's Tribute Honoring Igor Moiseyev, 2011
- Excerpts from ballet "Paquita" by Ludwig Minkus, 2012
- Divertissement from the 3rd act of Tchaikovsky's "Swan Lake", 2012
- "The Kingdom of the Shades" from Petipa's ballet La Bayadère, 2012
- Ballet "Chopiniana", 2013
- “Dream” Scene from ballet “Don Quixote”, 2013
- Excerpts from Tchaikovsky's "The Sleeping Beauty", 2014
- Ballet "The Giant Turnip", 2014
- Ballet "The Four Seasons: by A. Vivaldi, 2014
- Excerpts from ballet "Paquita", 2015
- “Coming to America” Special, 2015
- Excerpts from ballet “Swan Lake”, 2015
- Ballet "The Sunrise", 2015
- Ballet "The Carnival of the Animals" by Camille Saint-Saëns (Excerpts), 2015
- Ballet Orchestra, 2016
- Scenes from ballet "Cinderella" on the music by Sergey Prokofiev, 2016
- Divertissement from the 3rd act of Tchaikovsky's ballet "Swan Lake", 2017
- Ballet "Cinderella" on the music by Giuseppe Verdi, 2018
- Ballet "The Sunrise", 2019
- Ballet "The Twelve Months" on the music by Pyotr Tchaikovsky, 2019
- Ballet "Peter and the Wolf" on the music by Sergei Prokofiev, 2022
