= Big Bang Theory =

Big Bang Theory most commonly refers to:

- The Big Bang, a cosmological model of the universe
- The Big Bang Theory, an American TV sitcom

It may also refer to:

== Music ==
- "Big Bang Theory Theme", a song by Barenaked Ladies (2007)
- Big Bang Theory (Billy Bang album) (2000)
- Big Bang Theory (Styx album) (2005)
- Big Bang Theory (Harem Scarem album) (1998)
- "The Big Bang Theory", a song by Parliament from Gloryhallastoopid (1979)

== Television episodes ==
- "Big Bang Theory", Casualty series 20, episode 11 (2005)
- "Big Bang Theory", Hero High episode 23 (1982)
- "Big Bang Theory", NYPD Blue season 6, episode 11 (1999)
- "The Big Bang Theory", Family Guy season 9, episode 16 (2011)
- "The Big Bang Theory", Good Grief episode 12 (1991)
- "The Big Bang Theory", My Wife and Kids season 3, episode 24 (2003)
- "The Big Bang Theory", The Little Couple season 1, episode 12 (2009)
- "The Big Bang Theory", Tyler Perry's House of Payne season 2, episode 52 (2008)

== See also ==
- Big Bang (disambiguation)
