= Honda NS500 =

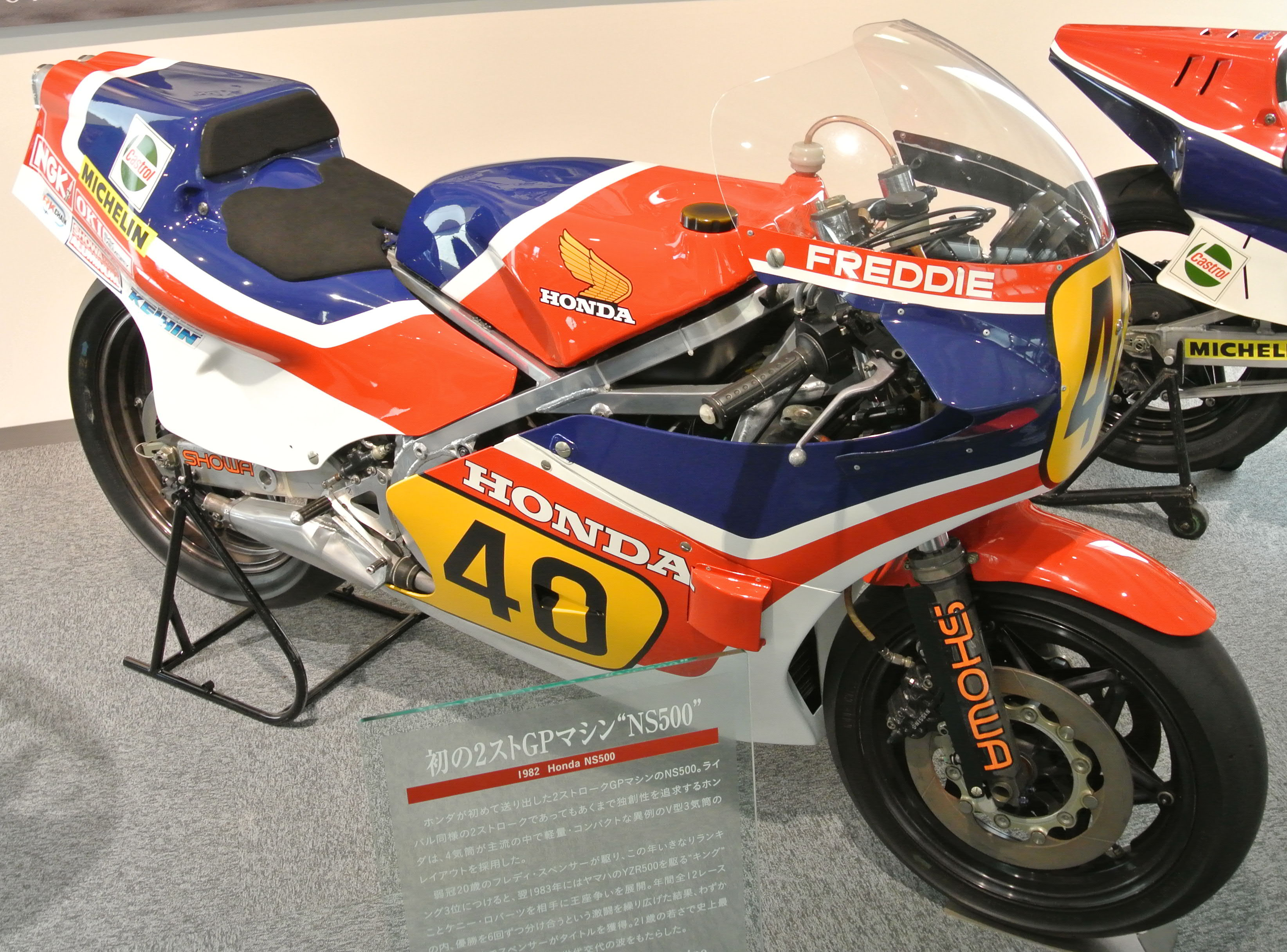
- Manufacturer: Honda Racing Corporation
- Production: 1982–1983
- Predecessor: Honda NR500
- Successor: Honda NSR500
- Class: 500 cc
- Engine: 499 cc (30.5 cu in) two-stroke 112° V3
- Bore / stroke: 62.6 mm × 54 mm (2.46 in × 2.13 in)
- Power: 123 hp (92 kW) @ 11,000 rpm
- Torque: 78 N⋅m (58 lbf⋅ft) @ 10,500 rpm
- Wheelbase: 1,380 mm (54 in)
- Weight: 108 kg (238 lb) (dry)
- Related: Honda NS400R

The Honda NS500 is a 500cc Grand Prix racing motorcycle of the early 1980s, powered by a two-stroke V3 engine. Created as a replacement for the innovative but unsuccessful four-stroke NR500, the bike went against Honda's preference for four-stroke machines but proved very effective and quickly won the 1983 500cc World Championship with Freddie Spencer on board. Spencer was able to use the lower weight and superior handling of the NS500 to achieve higher cornering speeds, and getting on the power earlier leaving corners. Ron Haslam also won the 1983 Macau Grand Prix on an NS. After a relatively short lifespan the bike was replaced by the more successful two-stroke, V4 engine powered NSR500.

== RS500 customer version ==
In 1983, Honda introduced a production version of the NS500 called the RS500 for privateer racers. These were very similar to the NS500 machines used by the factory racing team but, lacked the special exhaust system.
