= Cold Big Bang =

Designation of an absolute zero temperature at the beginning of the Universe

Cold Big Bang is a designation used in cosmology to denote an absolute zero temperature at the beginning of the Universe, instead of a (hot) Big Bang.

In an attempt to understand the origin of atoms, Georges Lemaître proposed (by 1927) that before the expansion of the universe started all the matter in the universe, it formed a gigantic ball of nuclear liquid at very low temperature. This low temperature was required to provide an adequate cohesion within Lemaître's primeval atom. In 1966, David Layzer proposed a variant on Lemaître's cosmology in which the initial state of the universe was near absolute zero. Layzer argued that, rather than in an initial high entropy state, the primordial universe was in a very low entropy state near absolute zero.

The mainstream version of the Cold Big Bang model predicted an absence of acoustic peaks in the cosmic microwave background radiation and was eventually explicitly ruled out by WMAP observations.
