= Big Bang (novel) =

2019 novel by David Bowman

- First edition cover
- Author: David Bowman
- Language: English
- Publisher: Little, Brown and Company
- Publication date: January 15, 2019
- Publication place: United States
- Media type: Print (hardcover)
- Pages: 624
- ISBN: 978-0316560238

Big Bang is a 2019 novel by American writer David Bowman, published almost seven years after his death. The introduction is by Jonathan Lethem and was excerpted in The New Yorker. It is Bowman's fourth book and the only one not published in his lifetime. Bowman worked on it for more than a decade. Its working title was Tall Cool One.

The novel is set in the 1950s and early 1960s, and includes fictionalized versions of John F. Kennedy, Norman Mailer, Pat Nixon, E. Howard Hunt, Carl Djerassi, Marilyn Monroe, Willem de Kooning, Ngo Dinh Diem, a pre-fame Jimi Hendrix, Lee Radziwill, Benjamin Spock, and other politicians, writers, celebrities, and notables of the era. Bowman had referred to Big Bang as a "nonfiction novel."

== Critical reception ==
In its review of Big Bang, The New York Times called Bowman "an abundantly talented writer." Kirkus Reviews wrote that the book "is sui generis, the kind of novel that invents its form out of its own frenzied convocation of voices and moments: the 20th century in all its majesty and fear."

Critics have compared Big Bang to Don DeLillo's Libra and Underworld. DeLillo, as a young adman, appears as a character in Bowman's book.

== Works cited ==
- Bowman, David (2019). Big Bang: A Nonfiction Novel. Little, Brown and Company. ISBN 978-0-316-56023-8.
