= Honda MVX250F =

Honda motorcycle

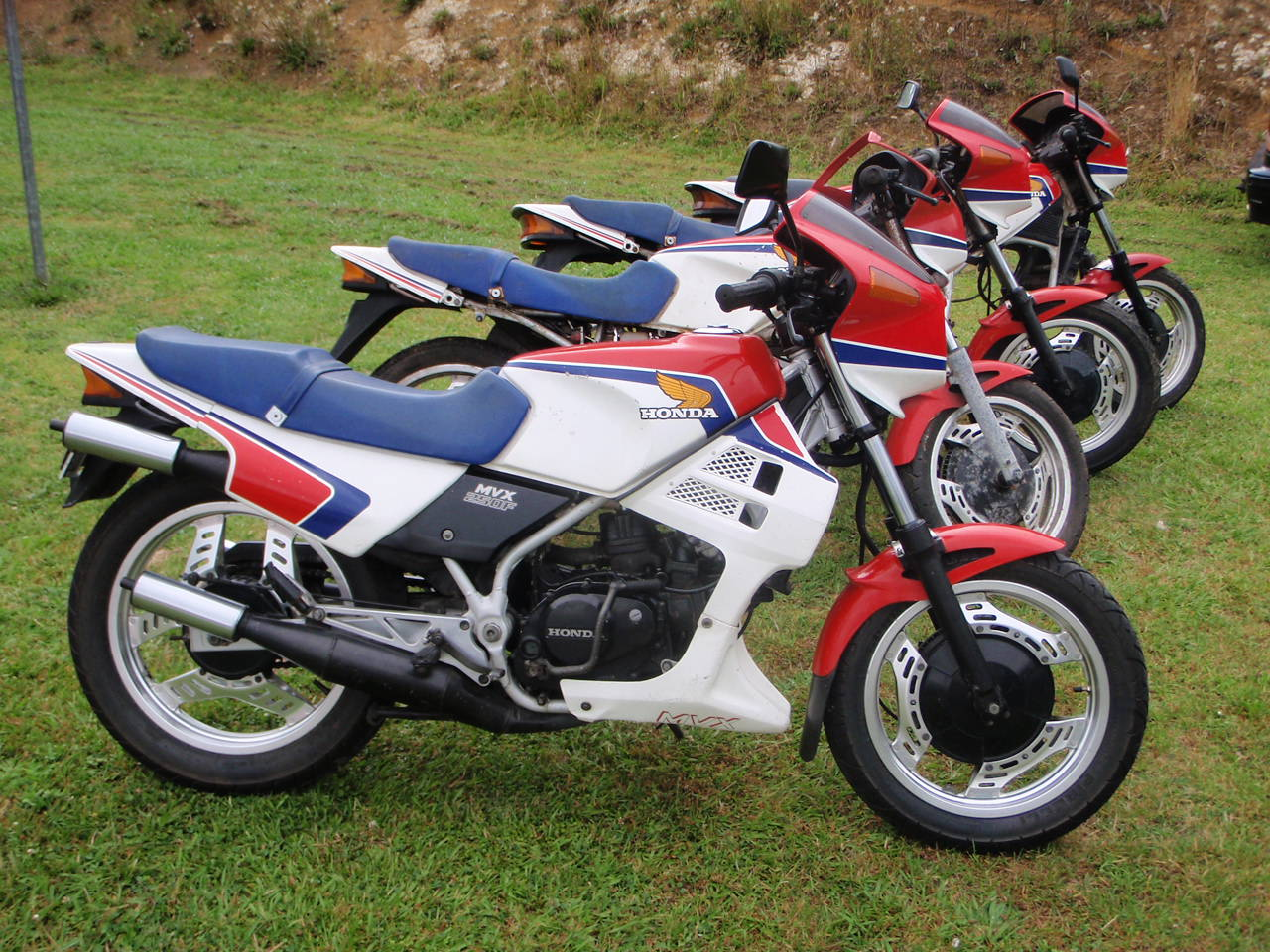
- 1983 Honda MVX250F
- Manufacturer: Honda
- Production: 1983–1984
- Successor: Honda NS250R, Honda NSR250R, NS250F
- Class: Sport bike
- Engine: 249 cc (15.2 cu in), liquid cooled, two-stroke, 90° V3; Crankcase reed valve induction
- Bore / stroke: 47 mm × 48 mm (1.9 in × 1.9 in)
- Transmission: Six-speed constant mesh manual, chain drive
- Suspension: Front: telescopic fork (with air spring cylinder); Rear: swingarm
- Brakes: Inboard single disc front and rear
- Tires: Front: 110/90/ 16"; Rear: 110/80 18"
- Wheelbase: 1,370 mm (54 in)
- Dimensions: L: 2,010 mm (79 in); W: 735 mm (28.9 in); H: 1,155 mm (45.5 in)
- Seat height: 780 mm (31 in)
- Fuel capacity: 17 L (3.7 imp gal; 4.5 US gal)

The Honda MVX250F is a Honda motorcycle with a water-cooled two-stroke V3 engine. New Zealand and Switzerland are two of the few countries in the world outside Japan where the MVX 250 was sold brand new through Honda motorcycle dealerships. The engine is mounted in the frame with the two outer cylinders facing horizontally forward and the central cylinder vertical.

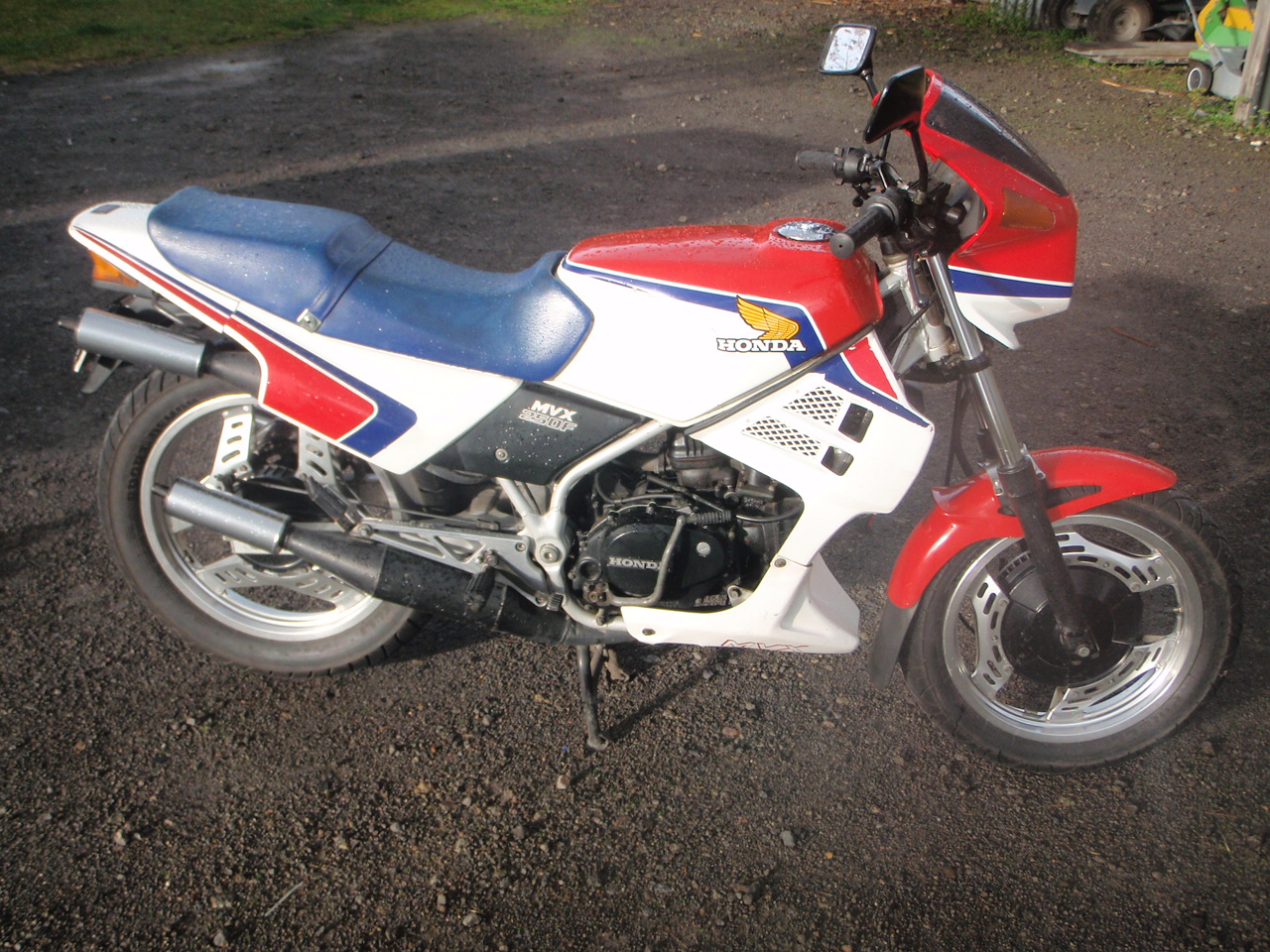
1983 MVX250F

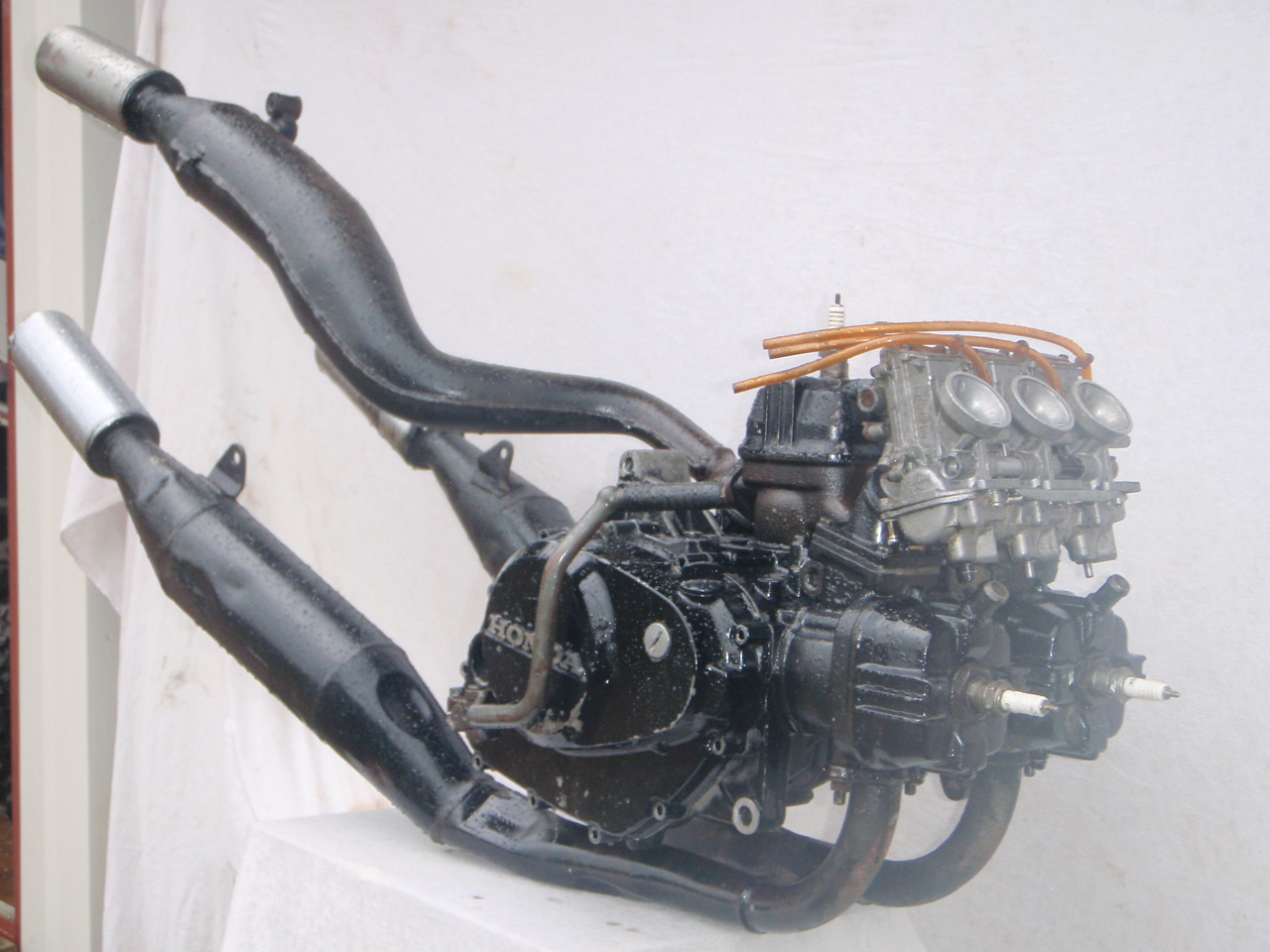
MVX250F engine

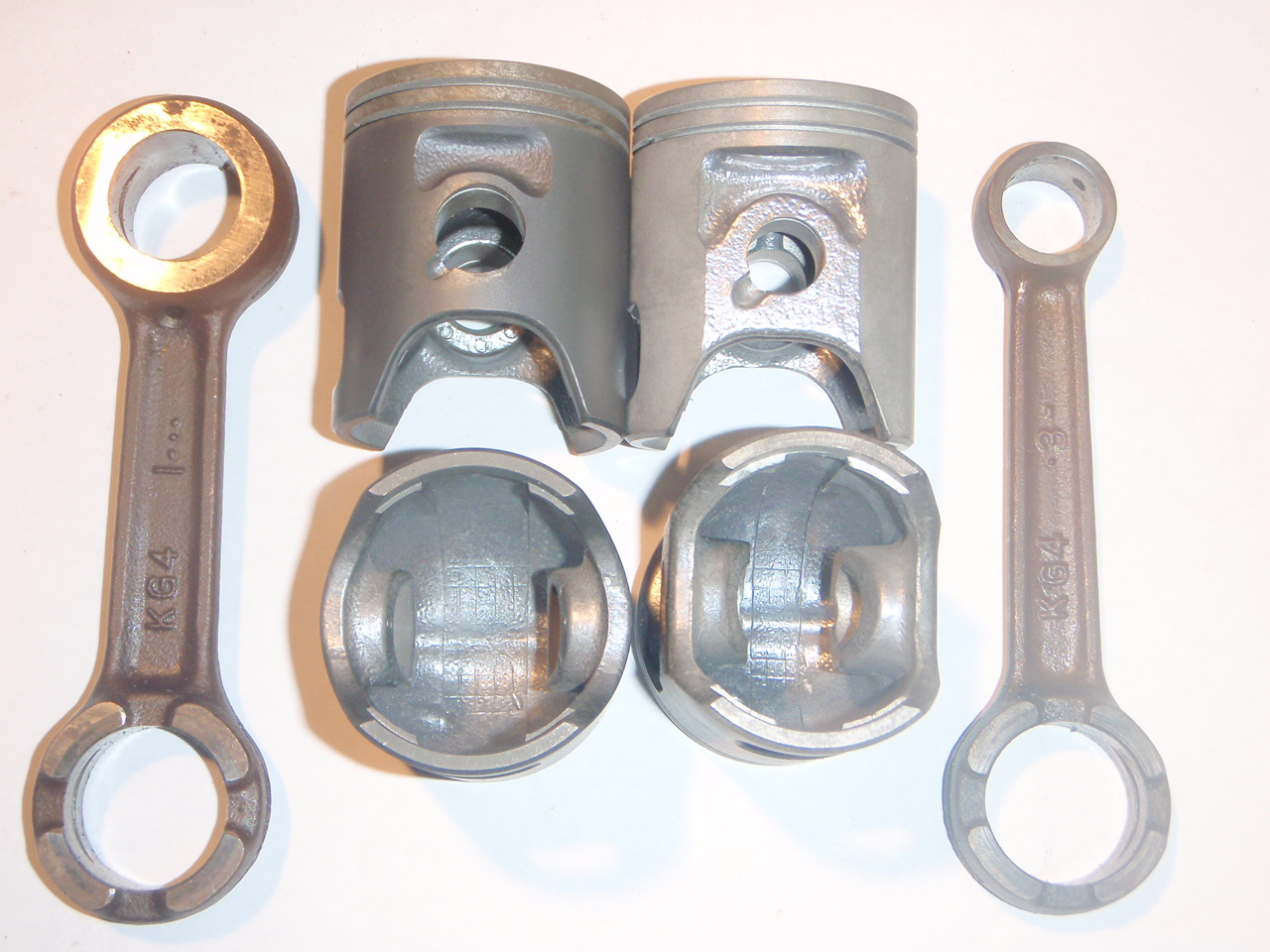

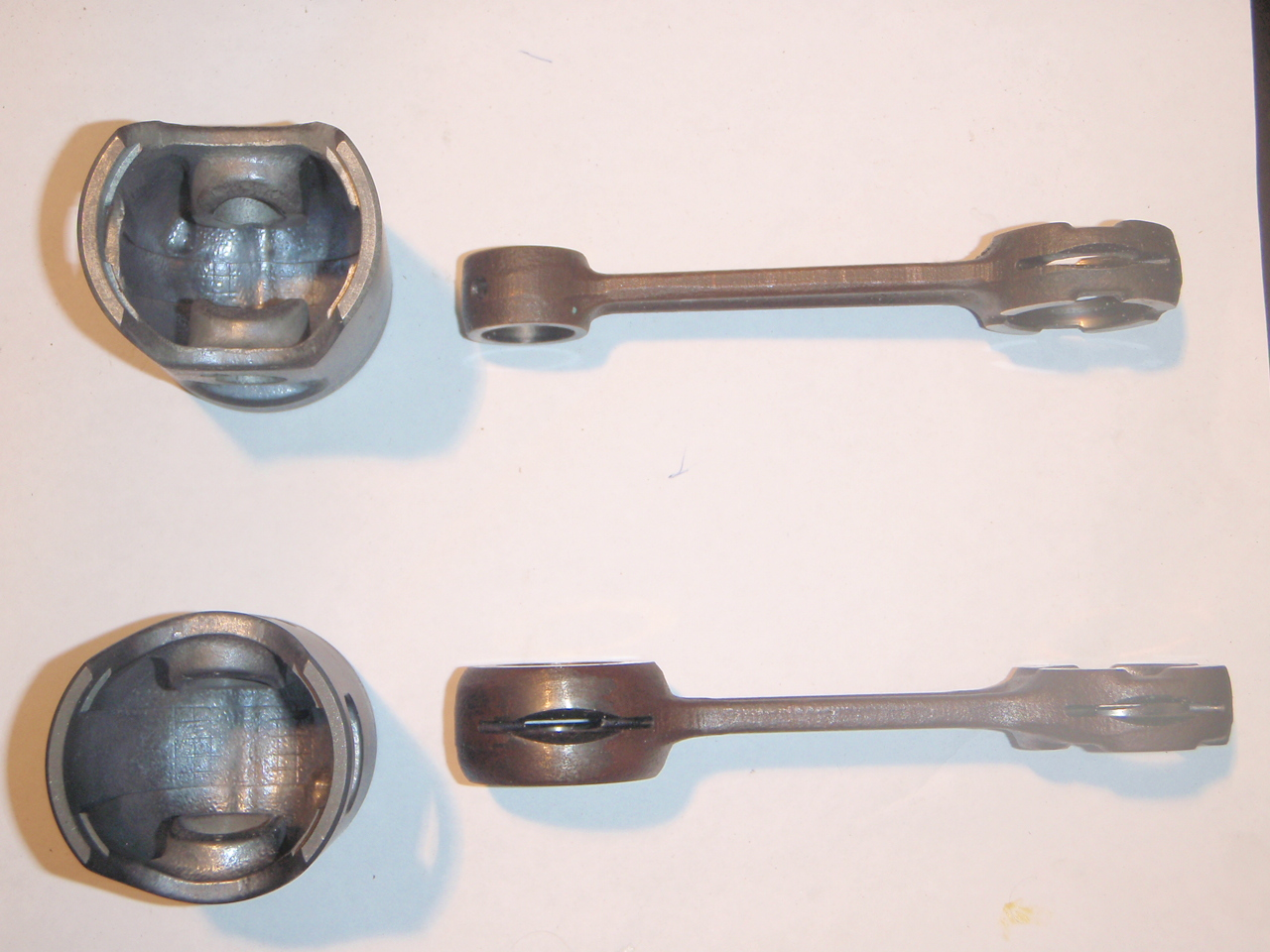

== See also ==
- List of motorcycles by type of engine
