= Yamaha TDM =

Sport touring motorcycle

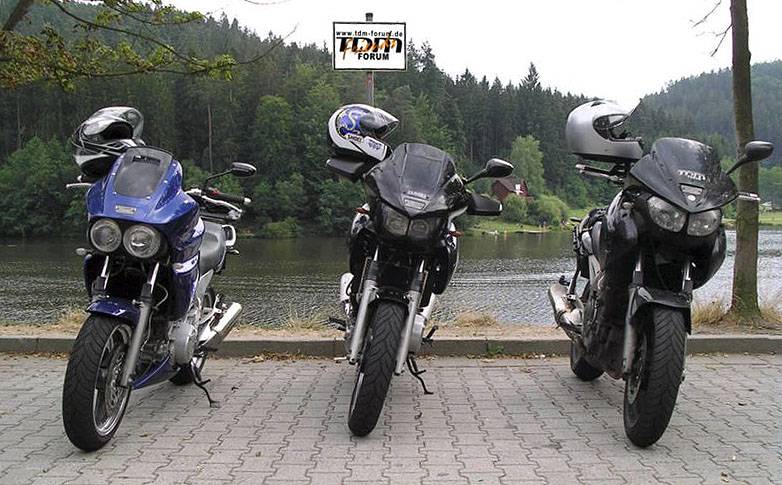
- The 3 generations of the Yamaha TDM
- Manufacturer: Yamaha Motor Company
- Class: Sport Touring

The Yamaha TDM is a sport touring motorcycle built by Yamaha Motor Company between 1991 and 2011. Yamaha developed and released three generations of TDM (TDM850 MK1, TDM850 MK2, and TDM900). They were sold largely in Europe with minor imports around the world.

The TDM was intended as a comfortable yet maneuverable motorcycle. The TDM's large size and heavy weight makes it unfavorable for serious off-road use, but its long-travel suspension is capable on gravel tracks.

The TDM's engine was derived from the Paris-Dakar winning Yamaha XTZ 750 Super Tenere. The TDM motorcycle was engineered by Yamaha to be capable of handling European mountain roads and to cope with rougher road surfaces. The TDM's upright riding position was radical at the time.

The TDM had low sales in the United Kingdom and the Netherlands at first, but sold in high numbers in other European countries, particularly in France, Germany and Greece. It was imported into the United States for two years, in 1992 and 1993.

== TDM 850 (MKI) 1991 to 1995 ==
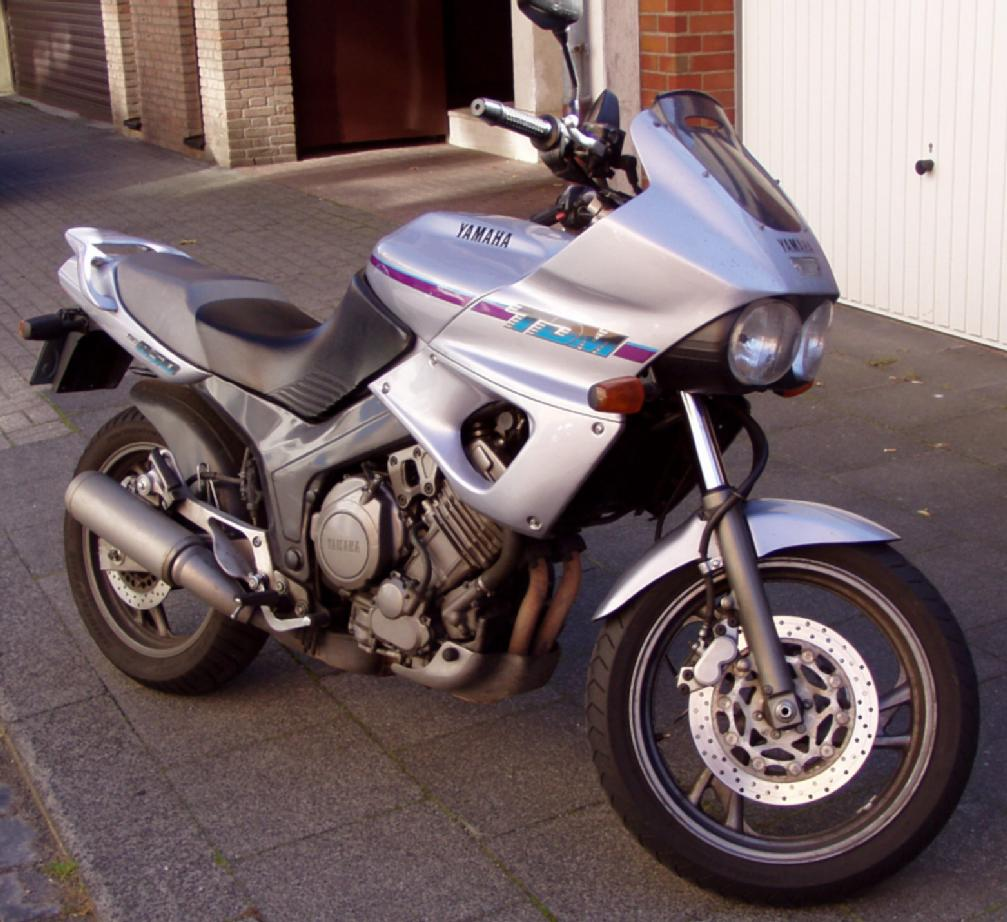
Yamaha TDM 850 (MK1)

The Yamaha TDM is an 849 cc DOHC parallel-twin motorcycle in the "Sport touring" category. The TDM was first manufactured by the Yamaha Motor Company of Japan in 1991. The TDM has a pressed-steel frame and a dry sump engine with five valves per cylinder.

The TDM850 MKI was released in 1991. The maximum bhp is 73.7, overall performance is high for a non sport motorcycle.

The TDM850 has an hybrid chassis: there is a Delta box, perimetric steel frame, and mid-long travel suspension, supplying more trail-like characteristics. The rear suspension is not progressive, the front suspension is a 41mm diameter cartridge fork. The braking is far more efficient than the XTZ, also having three disk-brakes. The front wheel has a 18' diameter, which is uncommon and limits tire choice.

The 3VD - Mk1 was produced from 1991 until 1995 with the only change being the color pattern.

=== History ===
The TDM was arguably the first road-oriented "Adventure Sports" motorcycle. The TDM's upright riding position was deemed radical for the time.

The TDM was imported into the United States for two years, 1992 and 1993. It had low sales in the United Kingdom and the Netherlands at first, but sold in high numbers in other European countries, particularly in France, Germany and Greece.

=== Reception ===
The TDM850 was received well in Europe by consumers and critics while having high sales.

MCN said of the TDM850 Mk II: "Fairly revolutionary when launched and certainly years ahead of its time, the Yamaha TDM850 was a sort of Multistrada 12 years before Ducati thought of it.

MCN later said of the TDM900: "The Yamaha TDM900 is a street biking oddball that’s as brilliant beating congestion as it is swinging bends. The parallel twin motor is spunky enough for fun, while the wide bars really let you take charge and hustle. It’s such an easy motorcycle to ride you could do it with your eyes shut".

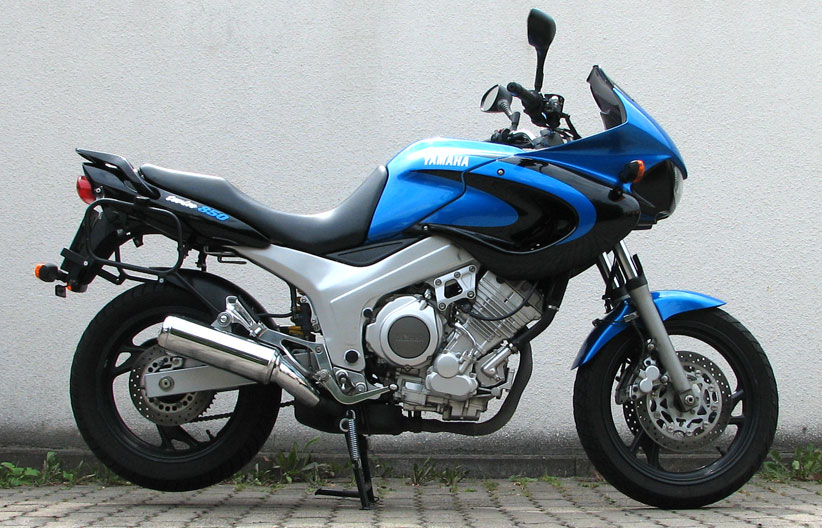
Yamaha TDM 850

== TDM 850 (MKII) 1996 to 2001 ==
In 1996, instead of the previous 360 engine, Yamaha released the Mk II TDM with updated bodywork and a 270° firing order engine that was shared with the TRX850. They also shared the same transmission. This new engine was first seen in 1995, when Yamaha introduced its TRX850 in Japan. Although early models came with no fuel gauge and a reserve fuel tap, beginning in 1999, Yamaha replaced the temperature gauge on the dashboard with a fuel gauge.

The main differences between the previous model are:

- New Twin 270° crankshaft engine.
- Standard front fork, diameter is now 43mm.
- Shorter travel suspensions.
- New fairing design.
- Improved gearbox.
- New secondary reduction ratio (16x43).
- Wiring modification.
- Electric fuel pump.
- New carburetors (BDSR38).
- New instrument panel : LCD trip meter, LCD clock, fuel meter, no more coolant temperature meter.
- Electronic speed sensor.

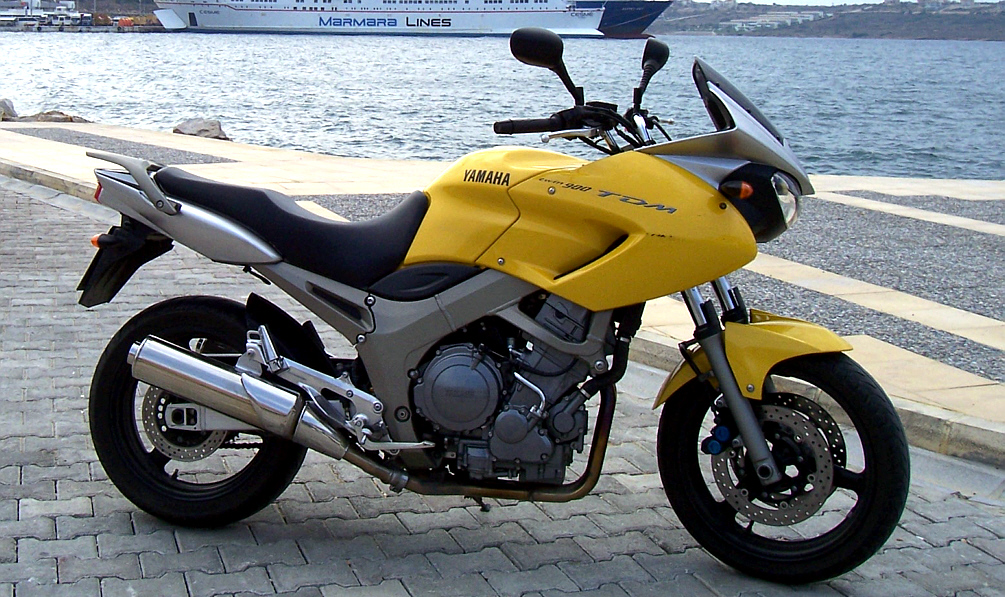
Yamaha TDM 900

== TDM 900 (5PS) 2001 to 2010 ==
=== History ===
Product planner Hennes Fischer remembers: "It all started back in the beginning of the nineties, when we wanted to create a bike, which would be ultimate fun on bumpy small roads. Most of us loved touring trips using tiny alpine pass roads. But most bikes at that time either needed full concentration on these small roads or simply could not cope with the constantly changing surface properly. Something in between a big Enduro and a street bike seemed ideal for this purpose. "The answer was TDM 850 launched in 1992. The bike instantly hit the heart of the French bikers, who were already customizing their Endures with street tires and better brakes. In the years to come TDM convinced the motorcyclists all over Europe of its benefits. Yamaha product planners often hear sentences like : "TDM is many bikes in one: a sports bike on small roads, a tourer on longer trips and a powerful commuter in city traffic."

In 1996 TDM saw major changes with a new engine and many chassis modification and a new face. The new styling attracted many new customers, and the bike became also very popular in the styling-sensitive Italian market. For 2002, the TDM is completely revised again. Sven Ermstrang, Product Planning manager in Yamaha Europe: "We want to take a long-term approach to our model development for the European market. That means sensible model changes, with real benefits for the customers: not changing for change's sake."

==== Design philosophy ====
He continues "That is why the TDM850, throughout its life, has remained essentially the same bike. It did have step-by-step improvements through the years, so that at 10 years of age, is still an excellent bike. It does not feel old since its function is very well up to date. Following our long-term vision, we wanted to make the new 900 version fit for the next 10 years by preserving all the good points and bring the bike to a higher level overall!"

Etsuo Matsuki, Project Leader of the new TDM 900 says: "Personally I love riding on mountain roads and I also love machines powered by a twin engine. As a fan of big bikes, I had a burning desire to build this third generation TDM. The image we had in mind during our development was a machine perfected for pass roads when touring in the Alps or Pyrenees for example."

Takuya Mochizuki, Product Planner adds: "I believe the new TDM represents the technological advantages and developments that have taken place over the last 10 years. Though the concept is the same than 10 years ago, the TDM 900 is a completely new machine from tip to toe."

=== Engine ===
The new bike comes with an increased capacity of the engine, making 84.8 hp (63.2 kW) and 65.49 lb·ft (88.79 N·m) of torque at 7,500 rpm. Together with the implementation of the electronic fuel injection system, this has affected the output power of the TDM. In addition, the old transmission was replaced with the newly developed 6-speed gearbox. The sixth gear is set to allow for maintaining highway speed at lower engine rpm.

Innovation: adjustable air induct and fuel injection strengthen the parallel twin character

Etsuo Matsuki and his team developed a variable intake duct intended to improve the TDM engine's torque and power. The air cleaner box adjust intake volume according to engine speed, reducing the intake area by approximately one-third below 4,000 rpm. The system was designed to improve throttle response, while the fuel-injection system automatically adjust the fuel mixture at altitudes of up to 3,000 metres. A three-way catalytic converter was also fitted as standard to reduce emissions.

The new aluminum frame is 6 kg lighter and increased 40% in torsional stiffness.

=== Chassis ===
To improve the handling character, the engineers reduced weight in every possible area of the bike. The steel frame was replaced by a newly designed aluminum construction, which does not only have higher stiffness but also 6 kg of weight less at the same time. In combination with the rigid mounted new engine the torsional stiffness increased by 40%.

As a result, the new TDM 900 feels more like a street bike when it comes down to pointing a line around corners. In particular in fast corners at higher speed the bike shows increased precision in following the riders input through the handlebars, which is transmitted by wider radial tyres on both front and rear YZF-R6 lightweight wheels. On the other hand, the long suspension stroke and setting still ensures a pleasant absorption of bumps, making the bike a first choice for critical surface conditions.

The increased steering accuracy is also a result of the improved weight distribution. The 30° mounting angle (instead of 40° on previous TDM) of engine and cylinders and other dimension changes enabled the engineers to achieve a favourable weight distribution of 47% to 49,8% on the front wheel. Project leader Etsuo Matsuki also utilized knowledge from development of super-sport machines. The longer rear swingarm with a YZF-R1 piggy-back rear suspension contributes to stability and accuracy. Yamaha's well known MOS 64 opposed piston one-piece callipers will withstand the toughest downhill pass road ride. even with a passenger on the back and a tank bag in front of you.

=== Differences between the TDM850 ===
Comfort is part of the TDM concept. The new body shape incorporates the rider in a slightly more forward position to give them a better direct control feeling of the front end. The designers however took great care at the same time to leave plenty of freedom for the rider to find the most suitable position for themselves.

Even though the new bike has a complete new body shape, it still is a TDM. Takeshi Umemoto from GK Dynamics was responsible for the new looks and believes: "TDM is simply TDM; an entity in itself. We knew an important point would be to carry on that TDM identity. So during the development we attempted to create a design that introduced new creative forms within the basic context."

In the past decade some 62.000 motorcyclists all across Europe have chosen a TDM 850.

== MT-09 Tracer ==
After 20 years producing the TDM, Yamaha Motor Company stopped the production in 2011. In 2014 rumors and photos leaked on the internet showed a new design of sport touring motorcycle with many similarities between the TDM and this new machine. In 2015 Yamaha released the MT-09 Tracer (FJ-09 in North America) developed from the MT-09 technology. Even when nobody at Yamaha mentioned the TDM during this project, many professionals and fans believed it is the direct successor.

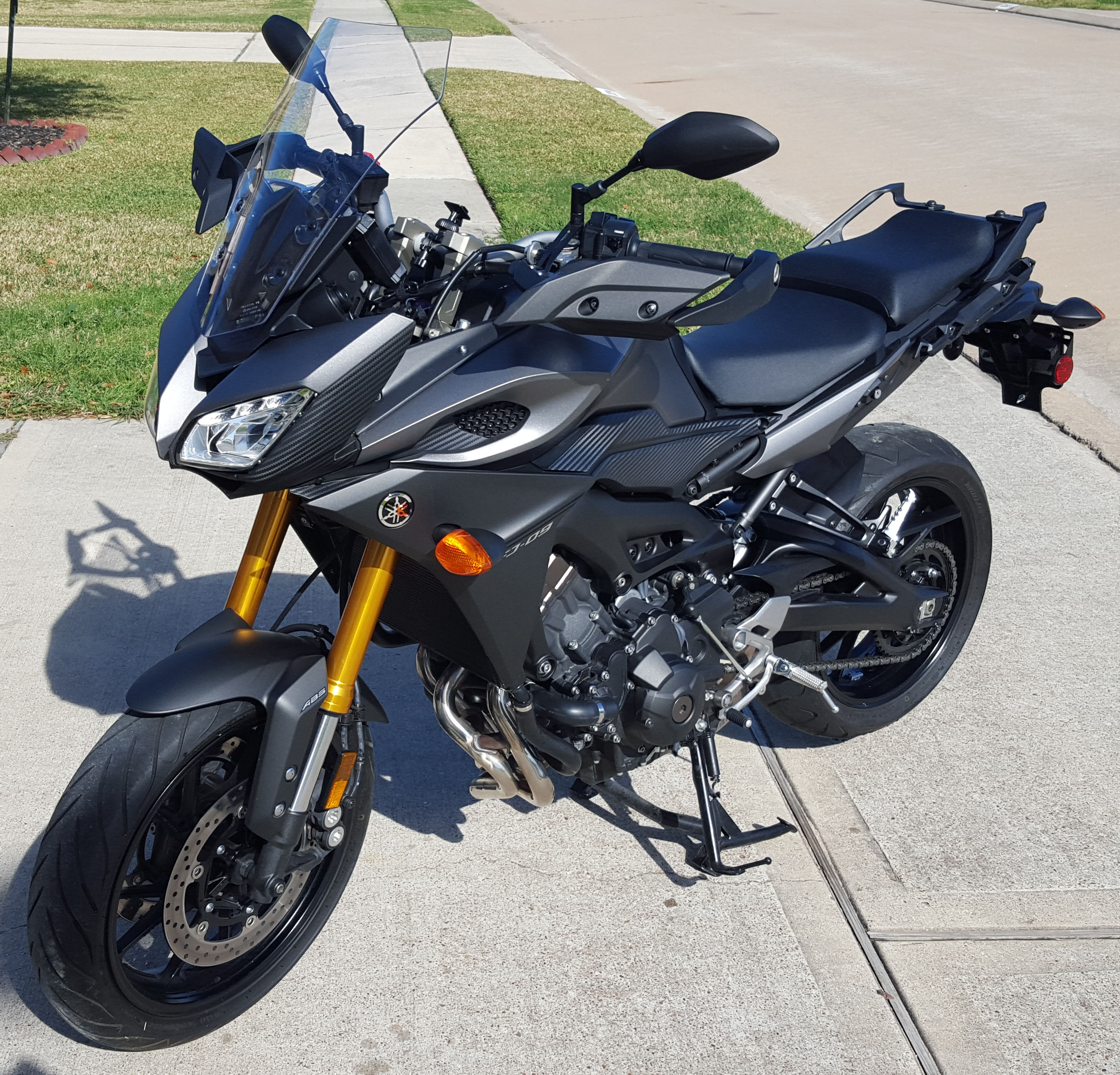
Yamaha MT-09 Tracer (FJ-09)
