= Polícia do Exército =

Polícia do Exército (English: Army Police) may refer to:

A type of Military Police:

- Army Police (Brazil)
- Army Police (Portugal)

== See also ==
- Military Police
