= Yamaha BT1100 =

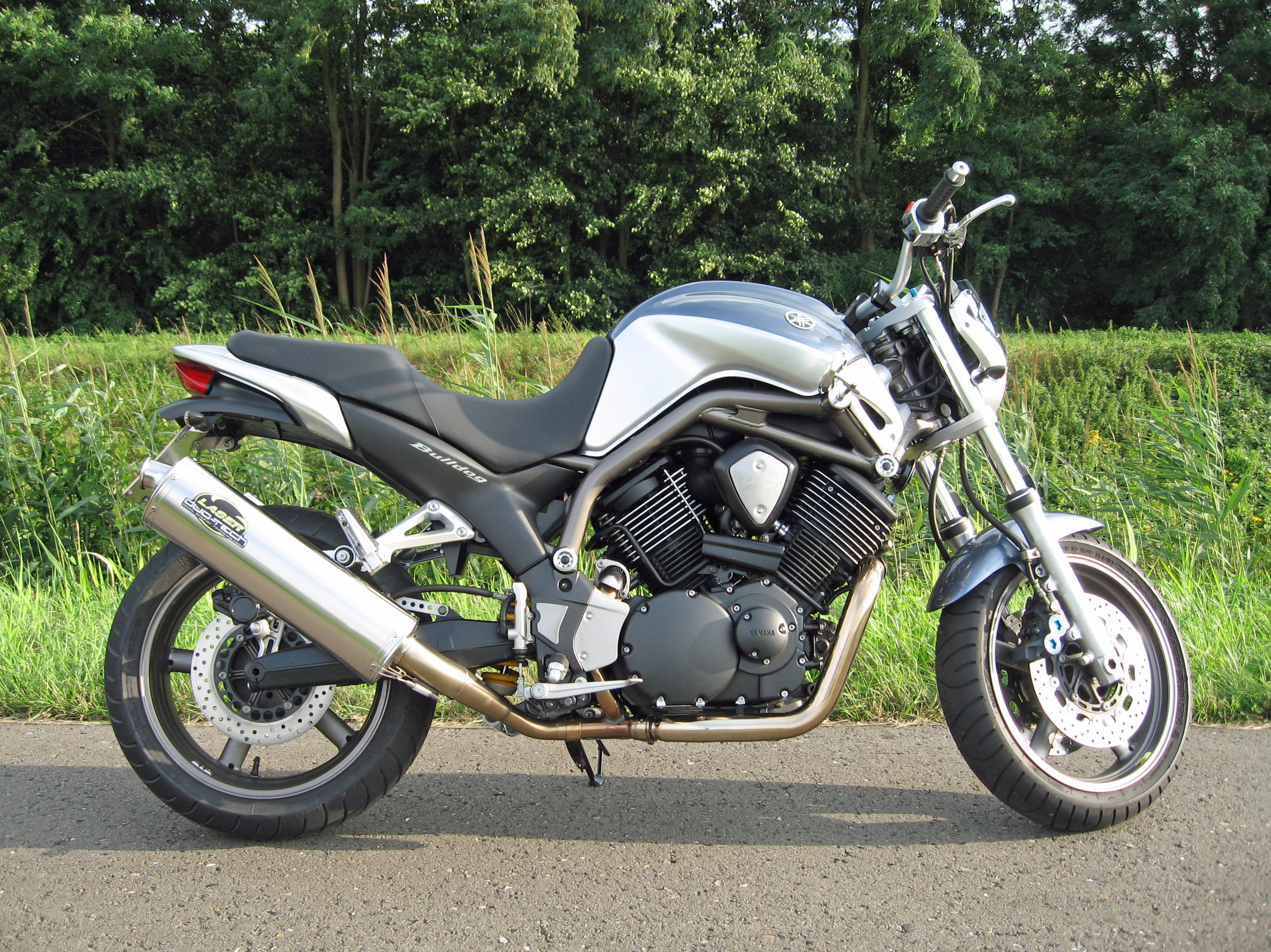
- Manufacturer: Yamaha Motor Company
- Production: 2001-2007
- Class: Naked
- Engine: 1,063 cc (64.9 cu in), air cooled, 2 x SOHC, wet sump
- Ignition type: Digital
- Transmission: Wet multi-plate clutch, 5 speed
- Frame type: Tubular steel trellis
- Suspension: Front: telescopic fork

The Yamaha BT1100 Bulldog is a motorcycle manufactured by Yamaha Motor Corporation between 2001 and 2007. It was available in the only one displacement of 1063 cm^{3}.

Powered by a V-twin engine with an angle between the banks of 75° with a displacement of 1063 cm^{3}, the BT 1100 Bulldog was revealed in July 2001.

The bike was produced by the Yamaha Italia branch in the former factories of Belgarda.

In 2005 it was modified with little update. Includes volcano searcher and reclining seat
