= 2nd Lancers Regiment (Portugal) =

- Regimento de Lanceiros N.º 2
- Active: 1834 — current
- Country: Portugal
- Branch: Portuguese Army
- Type: Military police
- Size: Regiment
- Headquarters: Regimento de Lanceiros N.º 2 at Amadora, Lisbon
- Nickname: P.E.
- Anniversaries: 7 February 1833
- Equipment: Glock 17; FN SCAR; Benelli Supernova
- Engagements: Liberal Wars; Portuguese Colonial War; Kosovo War; War in Afghanistan (2001–present)

The 2nd Lancers Regiment (Portuguese: Regimento de Lanceiros N.º 2, RL2) is a military police unit of the Portuguese Army responsible for the instruction, organization and maintenance of the Army Police (Polícia do Exército) operational units.

== History ==
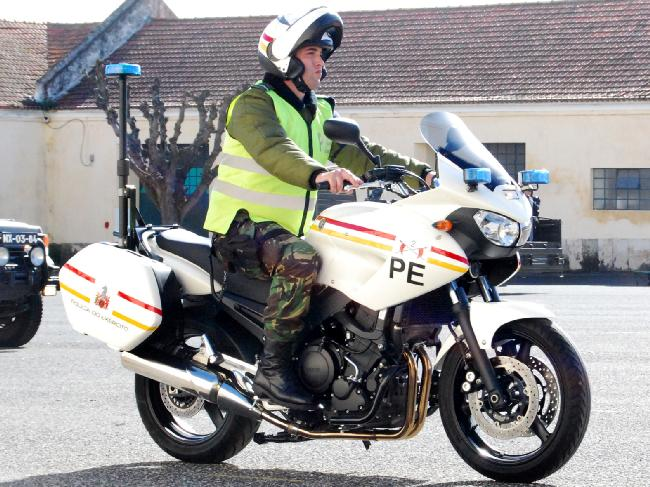
Portuguese Army Police Yamaha TDM 900 from 2nd Lancers Regiment.

The origins of the 2nd Lancers Regiment date back to the creation of the Queen's Lancers Regiment in 1833, by the constitutional army during the Liberal Wars. The idea for the creation of the regiment came from the observation of the success that resulted from the lancers during the Napoleonic Wars. Since its creation the regiment became an elite unit, responsible for the escort of the royal family, being mostly composed of aristocratic officers.

Two lancer regiments were created by the 1834 army re-organization, the second unit of which was broken down as follows:

1834 - 2nd Cavalry Regiment
1844 - 2nd Cavalry Regiment of the Queen's Lancers
1884 - 2nd Cavalry Regiment
1888 - 2nd Cavalry Regiment of Prince Charles
1890 - 2nd Cavalry Regiment of the King's Lancers
1911 - 2nd Cavalry Regiment
1948 - 2nd Lancers Regiment
1975 - Military Police Regiment
1976 - Lisbon Lancers Regiment
1993 - 2nd Lancers Regiment

The regiment continued employing the lance as a combat weapon until World War II, after which it was restricted to ceremonial use. At the beginning of the war, the unit was equipped with armored cars and light tanks. In 1953 with the creation of the Military Police, the regiment assumed the function of organizing, training and maintaining the forces of this specialized force. The unit was renamed the Army Police in 1976. Its motto is "Death or Glory" as its first commander was Lt. Col. Sir Anthony Bacon, an English officer that served in the 17th Lancers, adopting its motto. The Portuguese lancers were given the mission (and created for the purpose) to defend the Queen Maria II. The Regiment was involved in the Lisbon regicide in 1908 at various levels, the king's murderer, Manuel Buiça, served in the regiment as sergeant, the lieutenant that killed Buiça was serving in the Regiment (the Regiment still forms bodyguards), and Prince Dom Luís who became commander of the regiment (the royal family spent much time with the regiment, the officers were often invited to private events and referred to by their first names). The prince had a room in the regiment, where now is a library.

The Regiment is nowadays responsible for Crowd and Riot Control (CRC), Bodyguard (personal bodyguards for the Army Chief of Staff), Traffic control of military vehicles and Control of individual movements (correct use of uniform, etc.), and K-9 unit for drug search and CRC (using Labrador Retrievers and Malinois and Rottweillers)

== Equipment ==
=== Infantry equipment ===
- Glock 17 Gen 5;
- Benelli Supernova
- Heckler & Koch MP5K
- FN SCAR L STD
- FN Minimi Mk3
- FN40GL Grenade launcher

=== Vehicles ===
- Yamaha TDM 900
- Mitsubishi L200
- Land Rover Defender 110
- Toyota Land Cruiser
- Citroën Berlingo
- Mercedes-Benz Vito
- Unimog 1750L
- DAF YA 4440 D
- Mercedes-Benz Atego 4X2
