= Yamaha YZE 850 =

Yamaha XTZ850R
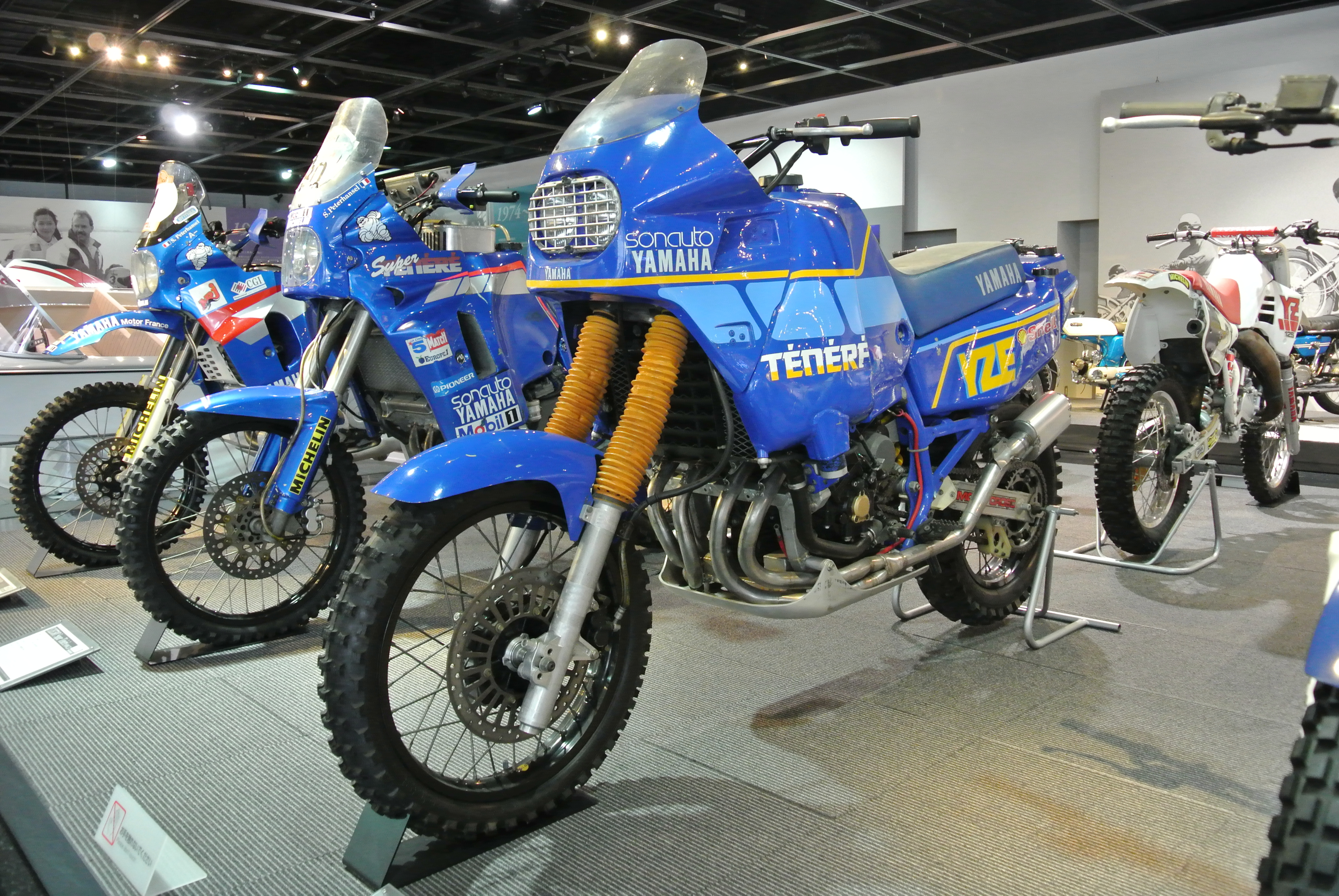
- Yamaha XTZ850R (first from left)
- Manufacturer: Yamaha Motor Company
- Also called: Super Téneré
- Parent company: Yamaha Corporation
- Production: 1992–1998
- Assembly: Iwata, Shizuoka, Japan
- Predecessor: Yamaha YZE 750
- Engine: 849.3 cc (51.83 cu in) parallel twin 5-valve DOHC
- Bore / stroke: 89.5 mm × 67.5 mm (3.5 in × 2.7 in)
- Fuel capacity: 38L+12L
- Related: Yamaha XT 500; Yamaha TDM850

Yamaha XTR850R was a twin cylinder rally raid bike, produced from 1992 to 1993 with the specific task of winning the Dakar Rally, winning in both years with Stéphane Peterhansel.

After a rule change for 1994 requiring production-based motorcycles, Yamaha produced the XTR850R based on the YZE using the production engine from the TDM850 and sold it to privateers for 140,000 french francs (approximately 3 million yen at the exchange rate of the time). The XTR850R won the Dakar a further four times from 1995 to 1998 (three times with Peterhansel and once with Edi Orioli).

== See also ==
- Yamaha XT660Z Ténéré
- Yamaha XTZ 750
- Yamaha XT1200Z Super Ténéré
