= Wet sump =

Part of a piston engine lubrication system

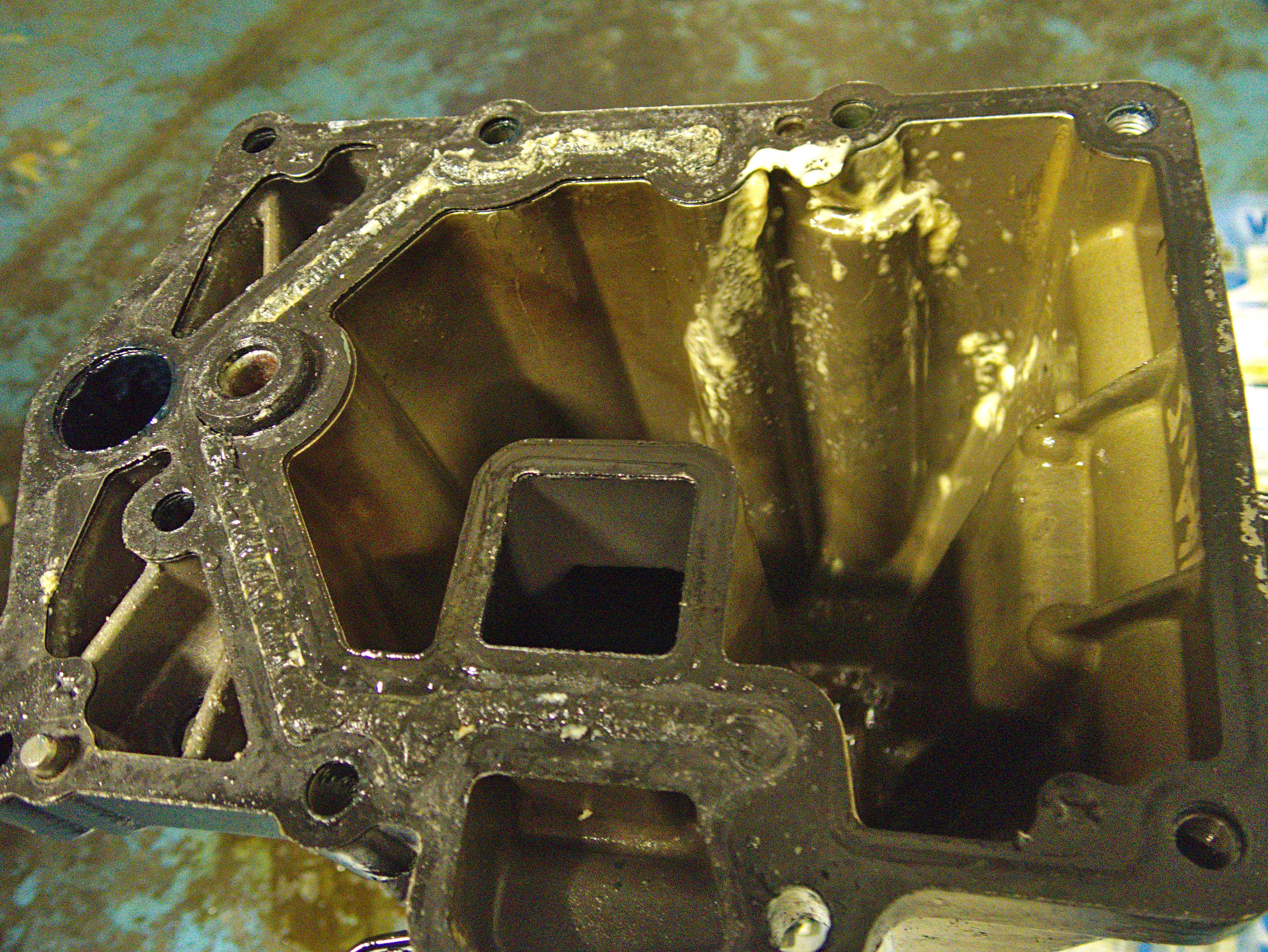
Interior and oil sump of an Tohatsu MFS30B outboard motor

Within piston engines, a wet sump is part of a lubrication system whereby the crankcase sump is used as an integral oil reservoir. An alternative system is the dry sump, whereby oil is pumped from a shallow sump into an external reservoir.

Piston engines are lubricated by oil which is pumped into various bearings, and thereafter allowed to drain to the base of the engine under gravity. In most production automobiles and motorcycles, which use a wet sump system, the oil is collected in a 3 to 10 litres (0.66 to 2.20 imp gal; 0.79 to 2.64 US gal) capacity pan at the base of the engine, known as the sump or oil pan, where it is pumped back up to the bearings by the internal oil pump.

A wet sump offers the advantage of a simple design, using a single pump and no external reservoir. Since the sump is internal, there is no need for hoses or tubes connecting the engine to an external sump which may leak. An internal oil pump is generally more difficult to replace, but that is dependent on the engine design.

A wet sump design can be problematic in a racing car, as the large g force pulled by drivers going around corners causes the oil in the pan to slosh, gravitating away from the oil pick-up, briefly starving the system of oil and damaging the engine. However, on a motorcycle this difficulty does not arise, as a bike leans into corners and the oil is not displaced sideways. Nevertheless, racing motorcycles usually benefit from dry sump lubrication, as the shallow sump allows the engine to be mounted lower in the frame; and a remote oil tank can allow for improved lubricant cooling. On some dry sump motorcycles, such as the Yamaha TRX850 and the Yamaha TDM, the oil tank is integral to the engine, sitting atop the gearbox.

Early stationary engines employed a small scoop on the extremity of the crankshaft or connecting rod to assist with the lubrication of the cylinder walls by means of a splashing action. Modern small engines, such as those used in lawnmowers, use a "slinger" (basically a paddle wheel) to perform the same function.

== Two-stroke and four-stroke engines ==
Small two-stroke engines, such as in motorcycles and lawnmowers, have total loss lubrication. Such engines use crankcase compression to feed the fuel/air mixture through the crankcase. This precludes the use of both wet sump and dry sump systems, as excess oil here would contaminate the mixture, leading to excess oil being burned in the engine and so excessive hydrocarbon emissions. These small engines run on specifically prepared fuel, a mixture of gasoline and two-stroke oil in a ratio recommended by the manufacturer. In some engines this mixture may also be independently pre-injected into the engine cylinders and bearings by a pump.

Four-stroke engines and large (non-petrol) two-stroke engines used in locomotives and ships may have either wet or dry sumps. Large two-stroke engines do not use crankcase compression; instead they use a mechanical blower or a turbocharger to aspirate air.

== Types of wet sump ==
- Splash lubrication
- Splash and pressure
- Full pressure feed

== See also ==
- Dry sump
