= Aprilia SL1000 Falco =

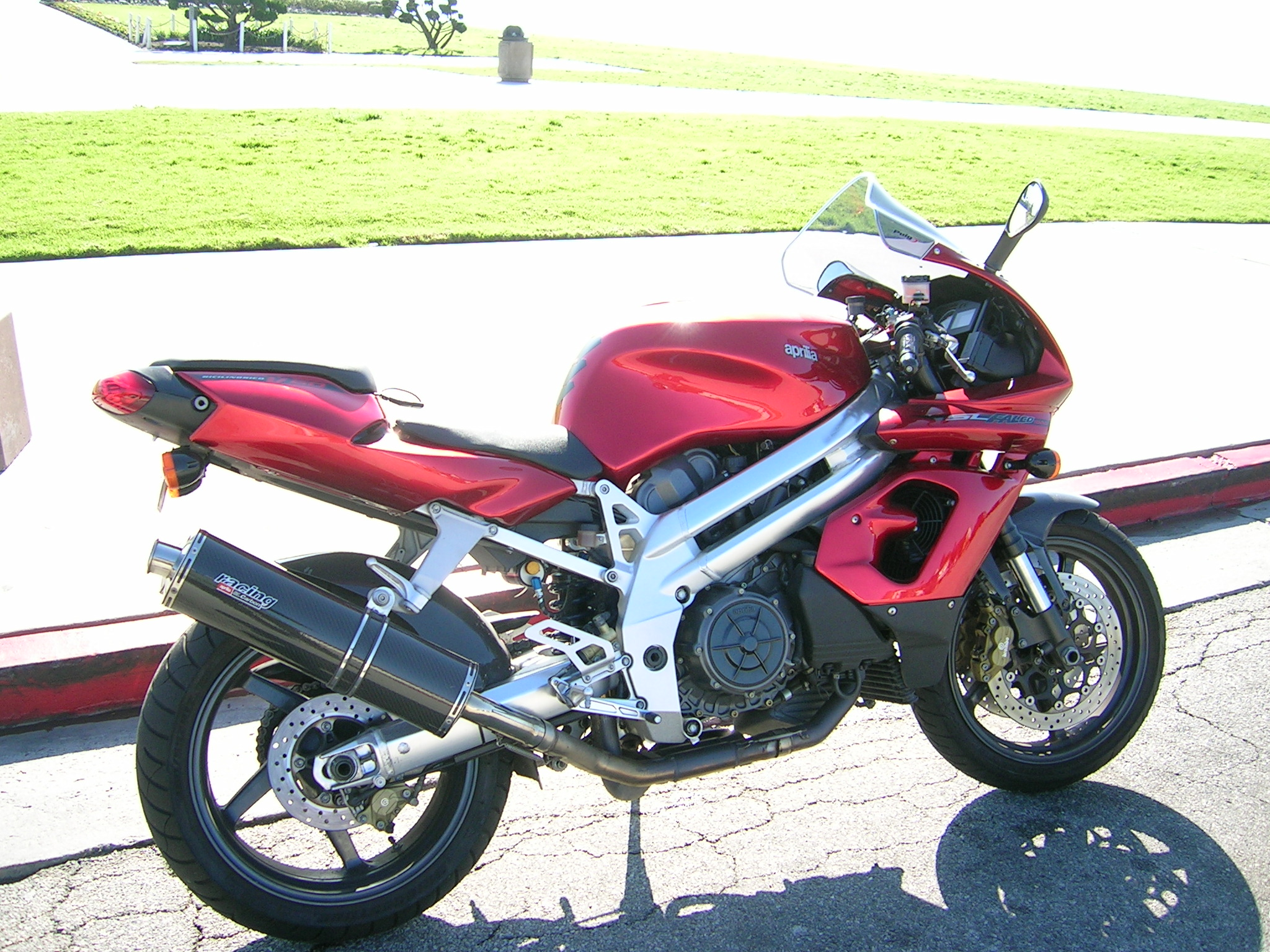
- 2000 Aprilia SL1000 Falco
- Manufacturer: Aprilia
- Also called: Aprilia SL Mille, Aprilia Falco
- Production: 1999–2005
- Class: Sports bike
- Engine: 998 cc (60.9 cu in) liquid-cooled 60° V-twin
- Power: 118 hp (88 kW)
- Torque: 69 lb⋅ft (94 N⋅m) @ 7,000 rpm
- Transmission: 6-speed, chain drive
- Wheelbase: 1,415 mm (55.7 in)
- Weight: 190 kg (420 lb) (dry); 222 kg (489 lb) (wet)
- Fuel capacity: 19 L (5.0 US gal) (including 4.5 L (1.2 US gal) reserve)
- Related: Aprilia RSV Mille

The Aprilia SL1000 Falco (also known as "Aprilia SL Mille"), is a sports motorcycle powered by a liquid-cooled Rotax 998 cc 60° V-twin engine, manufactured from 1999 to 2005 by Aprilia in Noale, Italy. The Falco's 118 hp (88 kW) engine was a detuned version of the 128 hp (95 kW) RSV Mille engine. The Falco's dual exhausts and remapped fuel injection reduced peak power slightly but bolstered bottom and mid-range. The Falco has a half-fairing, a twin-beam alloy frame, 53 mm USD forks from Showa (& later Marzocchi) and twin Brembo 320 mm semi-floating front brake discs. The clutch simulated a slipper clutch using a device activated by inlet manifold vacuum.

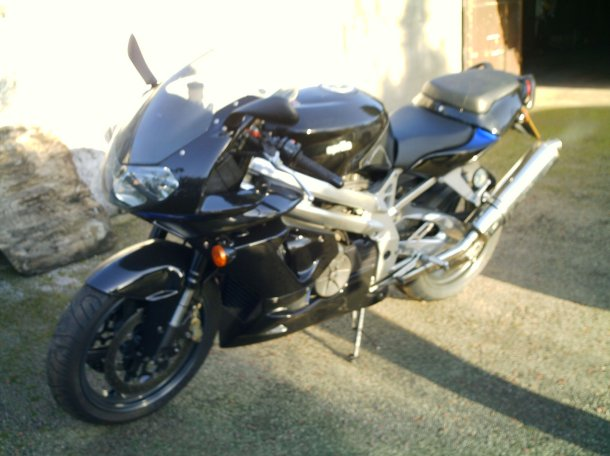
Aprilia SL Falco with bottom fairings

The Falco was not as radical as the "race-replica' Mille nor really a sports-tourer (such as their own Aprilia Futura) but, rather like the Yamaha TRX850, was instead a sporty half-faired roadster which competed in the market against the Honda VTR1000 and the Suzuki TL1000S. Although the Falco proved to be reliable and powerful, sales were disappointing and production ceased in 2005.

A Motor Cycle News review of the Falco declared: "Less is sometimes more. By making its roadster less extreme than the RSV Mille sportster it's based on, Aprilia broadened its appeal and produced a motorcycle that's both easier and more fun to ride."

== Specifications ==
Dimensions	
Length (including rear mudguard extension)	2,065 mm (2,170 mm)
Width	750 mm
Height (front part of the fairing included)	1180 mm
Seat height	820 mm (32.3 inches)
Wheelbase	1,415 mm
Ground clearance	140 mm
Wet weight (fuel tank full)	222 kg
Dry Weight	190 kg
Fuel tank	19 litres (including 4.5 litres reserve)
Engine Specification	
Engine Type	60° V-Twin, 4-stroke, DOHC
Engine Size	998cc
Bore / Stroke	97 mm / 67.5 mm
Compression Ratio	10.8:1
Starter	Electric
Cooling	Liquid cooled
Lubrication	Dry sump with remote oil tank & oil cooler
Clutch	Wet multi-plate clutch, hydraulically activated Simulated slipper-clutch using induction vacuum
Gearbox	6 speed
Performance	
Torque	69 ft.-lb. @ 7,000 rpm
Top speed	162 mph, 260 km/h
Corrected 1/4-mile	11.0 seconds
0-60 mph	3.41 seconds
0–100 km/h	3.2 seconds
