= Aprilia RST1000 Futura =

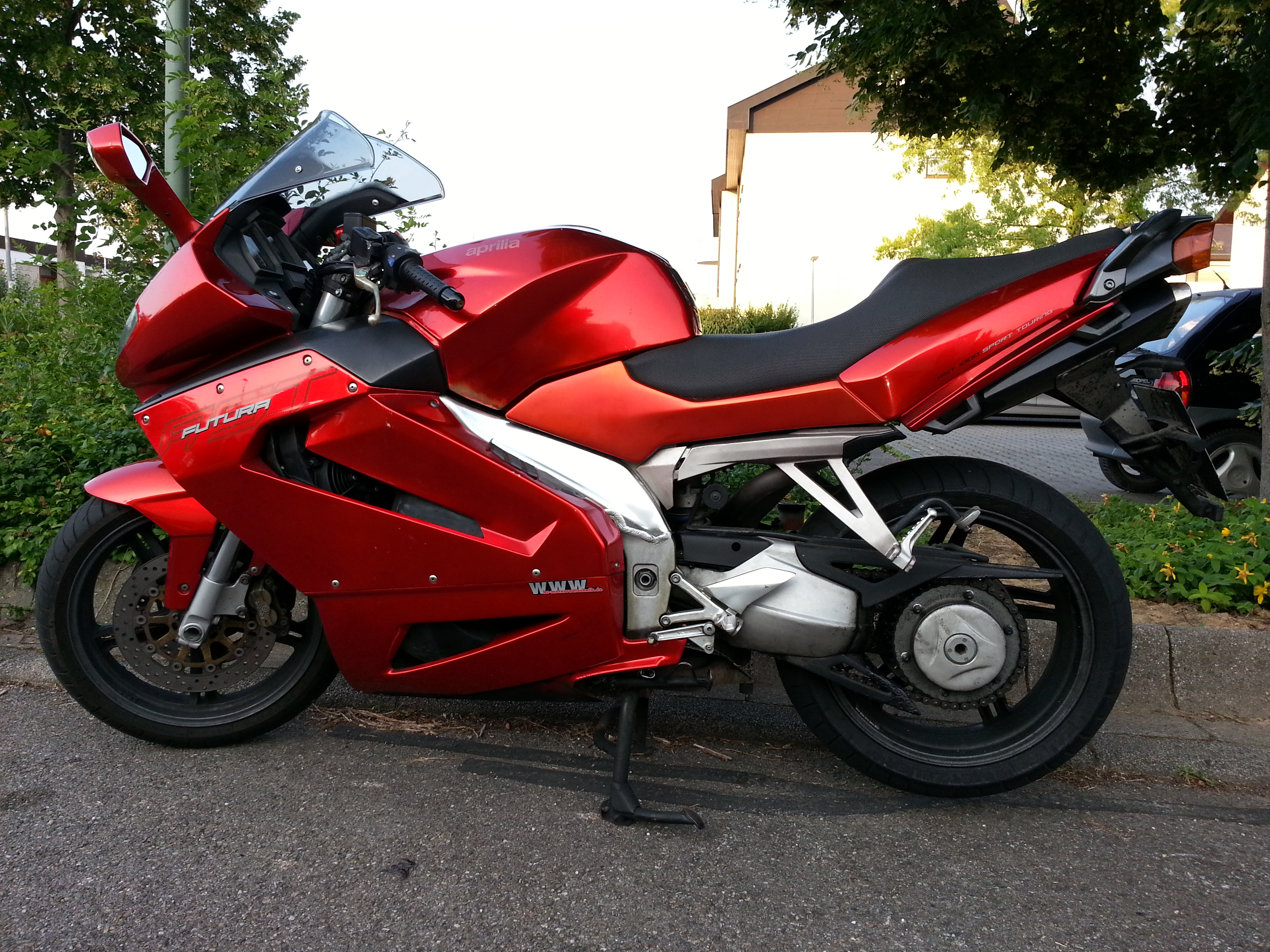
- Manufacturer: Aprilia
- Parent company: Piaggio
- Production: 2001–2005
- Class: Sport touring
- Engine: 997.62 cc, liquid cooled 60° V-twin, 4-stroke, DOHC, 4 valves per cylinder, twin spark electronic multipoint fuel injection
- Bore / stroke: 97 mm × 67.5 mm (3.82 in × 2.66 in)
- Compression ratio: 11.8:1
- Power: 113 hp (84 kW) @ 9250 rpm
- Torque: 96 N⋅m (71 lb⋅ft)
- Transmission: Six speed manual transmission, multiplate wet clutch
- Frame type: two-beam frame with light alloy cast elements and extruded elements)
- Suspension: front: 43 mm Showa upside down fork with adjustable preload and rebound damping, 120 mm wheel travel, rear: single sided swingarm with oscillating rear fork in light alloy with differentiated profile arms, single adjustable Sachs shock absorber with adjustable preload and rebound damping, 120 mm wheel travel
- Brakes: BremboGold Series. Front: Two Ø 300 mm double floating discs and calipers with four differentiated diameter pistons (Ø 30 mm & Ø 34 mm). Rear: single Ø 255 mm disc and a brake caliper with two Ø 28 mm pistons
- Rake, trail: 26°, 97 mm
- Wheelbase: 1,435 mm (56.5 in)
- Dimensions: L: 2,170 mm (85 in); W: 740 mm (29 in)
- Seat height: 830 mm (33 in)
- Weight: 235 kg (518 lb) (wet)
- Fuel capacity: 20.5 L (4.5 imp gal; 5.4 US gal) (reserve included), ~4 L (0.88 imp gal; 1.1 US gal) reserve
- Related: Aprilia RSV Mille; Aprilia Tuono; Aprilia Falco

The Aprilia RST1000 Futura is a sport touring motorcycle that was produced by Aprilia from 2001 to 2004. It is equipped with a 113-horsepower (85 kW) four-stroke 60° V-twin engine with electric-start, liquid cooling and electronic fuel-injection. The engine is broadly similar to that fitted to the Aprilia SL1000 Falco.

With its hard-shelled panniers, the Futura was intended to compete with the similarly styled Honda VFR800, but poor sales and Aprilia's worsening financial position led to the Futura's demise. Production ended in 2003, although the bike remained in the range until 2005.

== Design ==
The Futura incorporated an aluminium-alloy, double-parallel-beam frame with a single-sided swinging arm. Transmission is via a six-speed gearbox and chain-final drive. Other features included CDI dual ignition system using two spark plugs per cylinder, dry sump lubrication, mixed gear/chain timing, (AVDC) double-balance countershaft, and power-assisted hydraulic-controlled clutch, with a patented "Pneumatic Power Clutch" (PPC) to simulate a slipper clutch to control rear-wheel bounce during sudden deceleration. The Futura's dry weight is 210 kg (463 lb).

The chief designer in charge of the project was Pierluigi Marconi. He would design the Futura around the same motor used in the Mille, a 998cc DOHC 60 degree V-twin. Among major changes from the Mille were the single side swing arm and undertail exhaust used to retain space for the hard sided luggage. Marconi also specified an increase in the electrical generator in order to cope with accessories that touring riders were sure to add. Electrical capacity was increased by 30% over that of the Mille. Marconi directed his design team to spend an extensive amount of time on the exhaust system. The result was that it did not heat up the seat as other undertail exhausts did. It also passed Euro 1 standard emissions without the catalytic converter. The design team moved to supplier Sagem to provide the fuel injection and intake systems.

Marconi would later quit and go to work with Benelli and then later Gas-Gas. It was his leaving Aprilia that caused promised updates like ABS and power outlets to never materialize on the Futura.

== Reception ==
The bike's large, angular shape divided critics: some thought it was innovative and made it "look like an F-117" while others said it was just too bulky. MCN reviewed the Futura, saying: "The Aprilia RST1000 Futura is desperately underestimated, sadly short lived and now a potential bargain. Aprilia’s ambitious rival for Honda’s polished VFR sports-tourer is able, well-specced and potent".
