= Yamaha YZE 750 =

Motorcycle

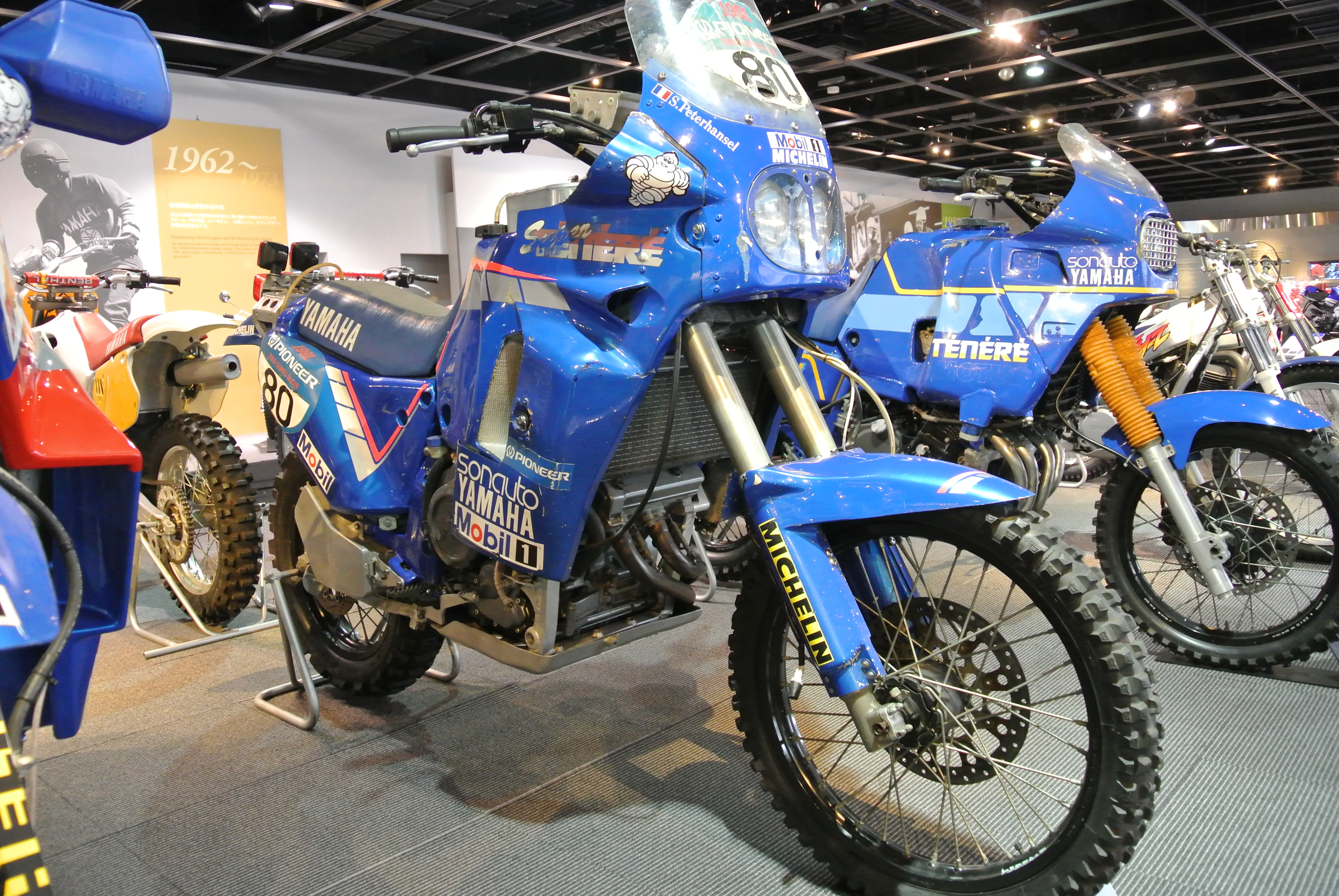
- 1991 Dakar Rally winning Yamaha YZE 750
- Manufacturer: Yamaha Motor Company
- Also called: Super Téneré
- Parent company: Yamaha Corporation
- Production: 1988–1991
- Assembly: Iwata, Shizuoka, Japan
- Predecessor: Yamaha XT 680
- Successor: Yamaha YZE 850
- Engine: 802.5 cc (48.97 cu in) parallel twin 5-valve DOHC (0WC5, 1991)
- Bore / stroke: 87 mm × 67.5 mm (3.4 in × 2.7 in)
- Power: >75HP @ 7000rpm
- Transmission: 5-speed
- Weight: 194kg (dry)
- Fuel capacity: 38L+26L
- Related: Yamaha XT 500

Yamaha YZE 750 was a rally raid bike, produced from 1988 to 1991 with the specific task of winning the Dakar Rally, that won 1991 Dakar Rally with French biker Stéphane Peterhansel.

== Rally Dakar ==
Year	Team	Sponsor	Bikers	Rank
1988	Belgarda	Chesterfield	(Italy) Franco Picco	2nd
1988	Belgarda	Chesterfield	(Italy) Luigi Medardo	Ret.
1988	Belgarda	Chesterfield	(Italy) Ivan Alborghetti	Ret.
1988	Belgarda	Chesterfield	(Italy) Giorgio Grasso	Ret.
1988		Camper	(Spain) Carlos Mas	4th
1988	Sonauto	Mobil	(France) Jean-Claude Olivier	7th
1988	Sonauto	Mobil	(France) Thierry Charbonnier	16th
1988	Sonauto	Mobil	(France) Stéphane Peterhansel	18th
1988	Sonauto	Mobil	(France) Andre Malherbe	Ret.
1989	Belgarda	Chesterfield	(Italy) Franco Picco	2nd
1990	Sonauto		(Spain) Carlos Mas	2nd
1990	Sonauto		(France) Gilles Piccard	6th
1991	Sonauto	Mobil	(France) Stéphane Peterhansel	1st
1991	Sonauto	Mobil	(France) Gilles Lalay	2nd
1991	Sonauto	Mobil	(France) Thierry Magnaldi	3rd

== See also ==
- Yamaha XT660Z Ténéré
- Yamaha XTZ 750
- Yamaha XT1200Z Super Ténéré
