= Franco Picco =

Italian motorcycle racer

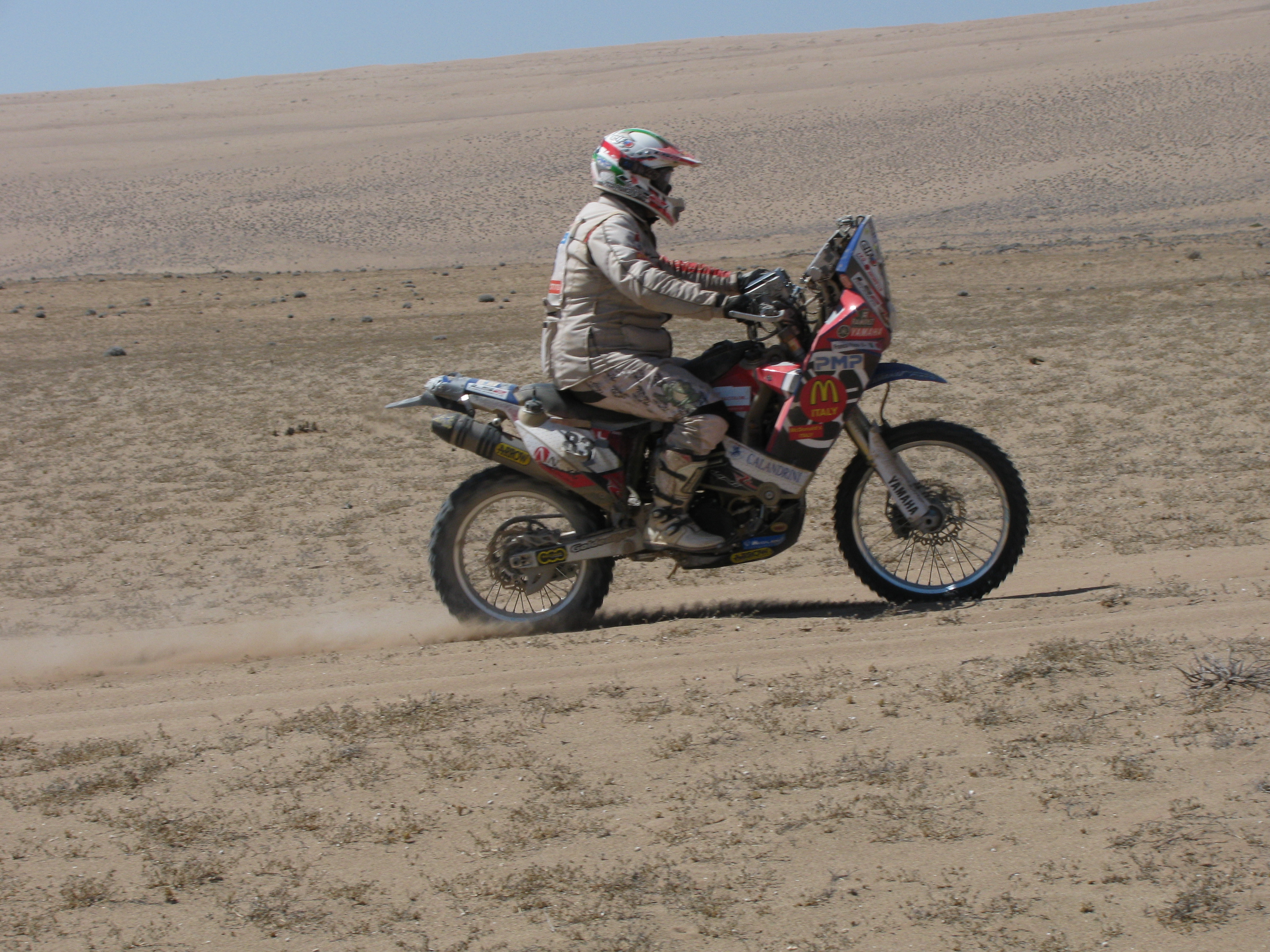
- Franco Picco at the 2011 Dakar Rally

Personal information
- Born: 4 October 1955 (age 71) Vicenza, Italy

Sport
- Country: Italy
- Sport: Motorsport
- Event: Rally raid
Medal record
Rally raid
Event	1st	2nd	3rd
Dakar Rally	0	2	1
Rallye des Pharaons	2	0	0
Total	2	2	1

Franco Picco (born 4 October 1955) is an Italian former professional rally raid motorcyclist. He has placed three-times on the podium at the Dakar Rally and is a two-time winner of the Pharaoh's Rally. In 2015, Picco was named an FIM Legend for his motorcycle racing career.

== Rally Dakar ==
Year	Bike	Rank
1985	Yamaha 600 XT	3rd
1986	Yamaha 600 XT	10th
1987	Yamaha YZE 750	4th
1988	Yamaha YZE 750	2nd
1989	Yamaha YZE 750	2nd
1990	Yamaha YZE 750	5th
2010	Yamaha WR 450F	23rd
2011	Yamaha WR 450F	77th
2012	Yamaha WR 450F	45th
