= Army Police (Portugal) =

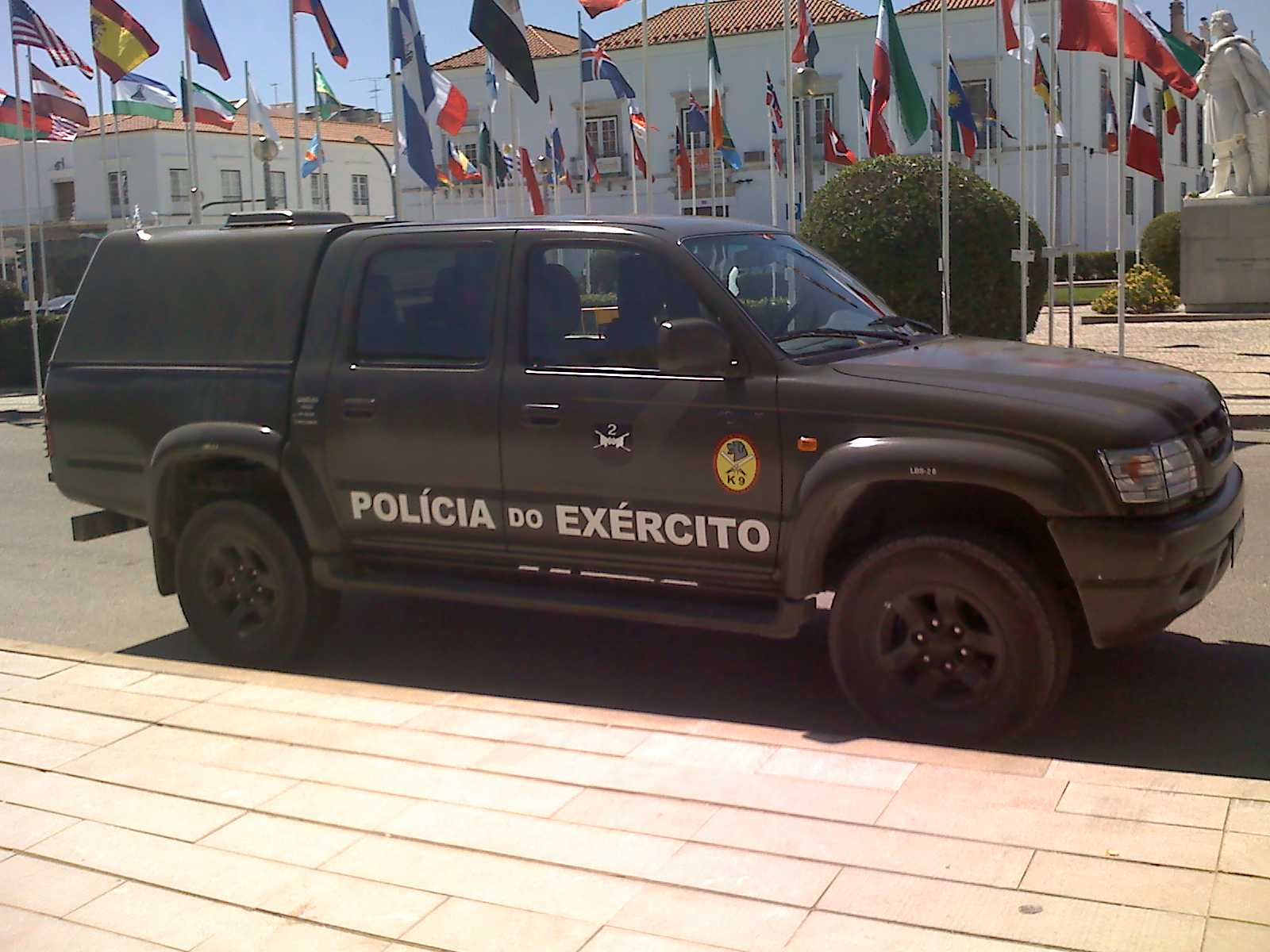
Polícia do Exército Toyota Hilux

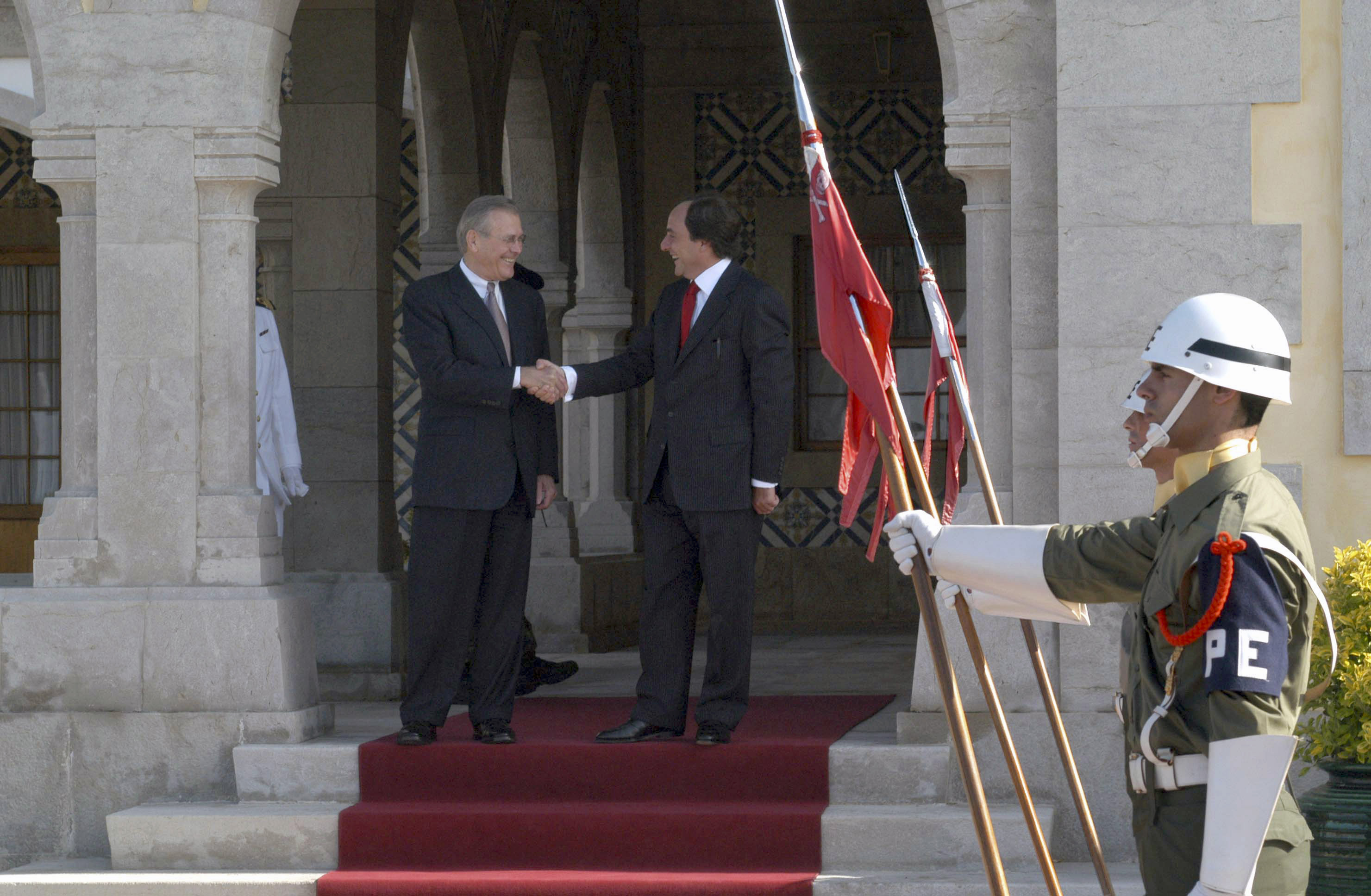
Army Police Honor Guard for Donald Rumsfeld.

The Army Police (Portuguese: Polícia do Exército, PE), usually called the Lanceiros, is the military police of the Portuguese Army — formerly designated as Polícia Militar (Military Police) between 1953 and 1976. In the Portuguese Army it is a speciality of the Cavalry Arm, being the instruction and organization of the Army Police forces is of the responsibility of the Regimento de Lanceiros Nº 2 (2nd Lancers Regiment).

The military police wear a black beret.

== Field organization ==
Operational units of the Army Police:

- Army Police Group of the Army's Permanent Operational Force General Support Forces;
- Army Police platoons of the Mechanized Brigade, of the Rapid Reaction Brigade, of the Intervention Brigade, of the Military Zone of Azores and of the Military Zone of Madeira;
- Army Police platoon of the Military Prison;
- Army Police platoon of the School of Cavalry.

== Equipment ==
=== Infantry equipment ===
- Glock 17 Gen 5;
- Benelli Supernova
- Heckler & Koch MP5K
- FN SCAR L STD
- FN Minimi Mk3
- FN40GL Grenade launcher

=== Vehicles ===
- Yamaha TDM 900
- Hmmwv M1151A2
- Mitsubishi L200
- Land Rover Defender 110
- Toyota Land Cruiser
- Citroën Berlingo
- Mercedes-Benz Vito
- Unimog 1750L
- DAF YA 4440 D
- Mercedes-Benz Atego 4X2

== See also ==
- Army Police (Brazil)
