= Army Police (Brazil) =

Military police of the Brazilian Army

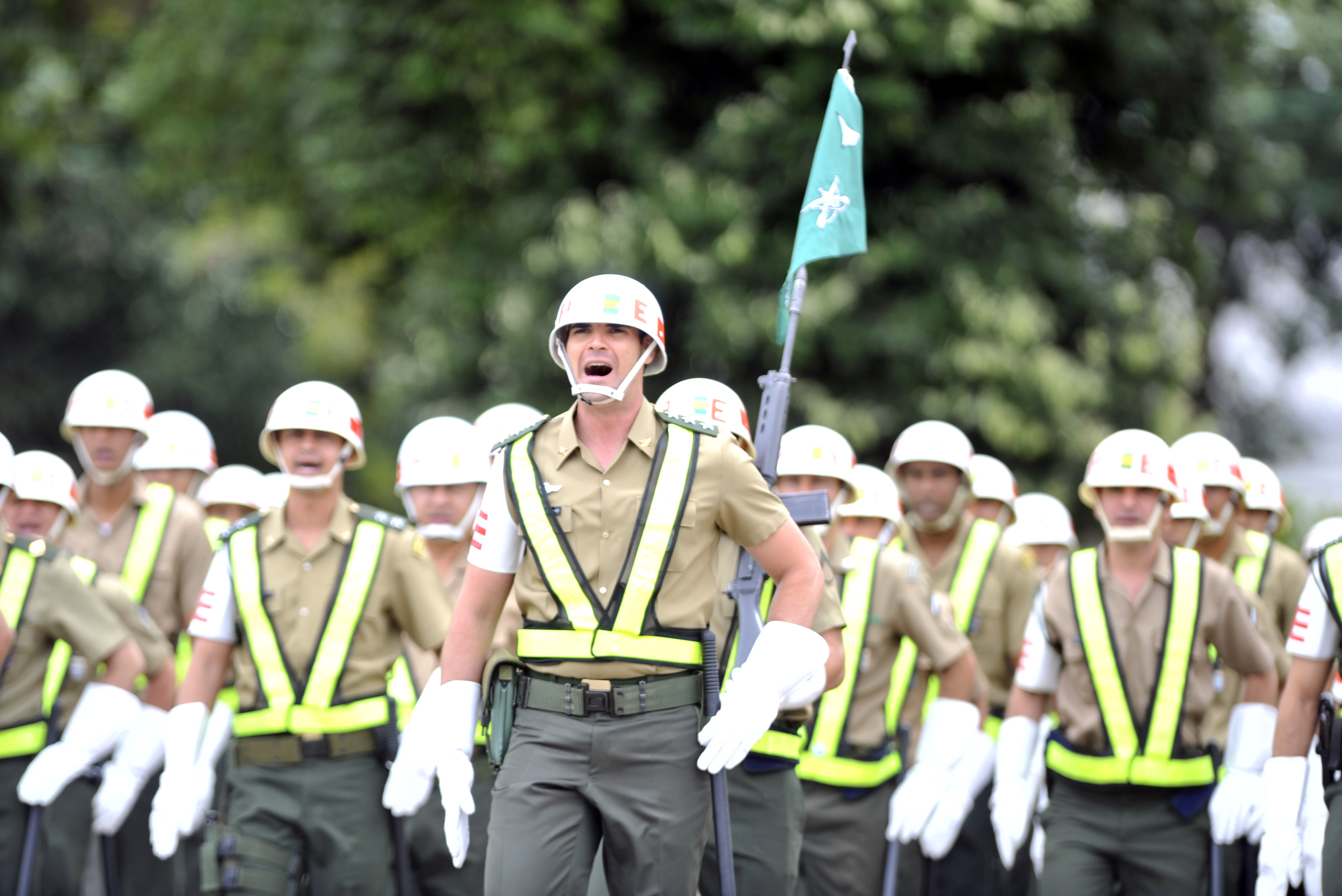
Brazilian Army police

The Army Police (Portuguese: Polícia do Exército, PE) are the military police of the Brazilian Army. Their history dates back to 1944.

In the Brazilian Army, the Military Police is a specialty of Infantry. The operational units are battalions and companies.

Members of the Brazilian Military Police identified by the use of helmet and black brassards with the letters "PE" in white (or blue-collar and white helmet with red letters).

== Duties ==
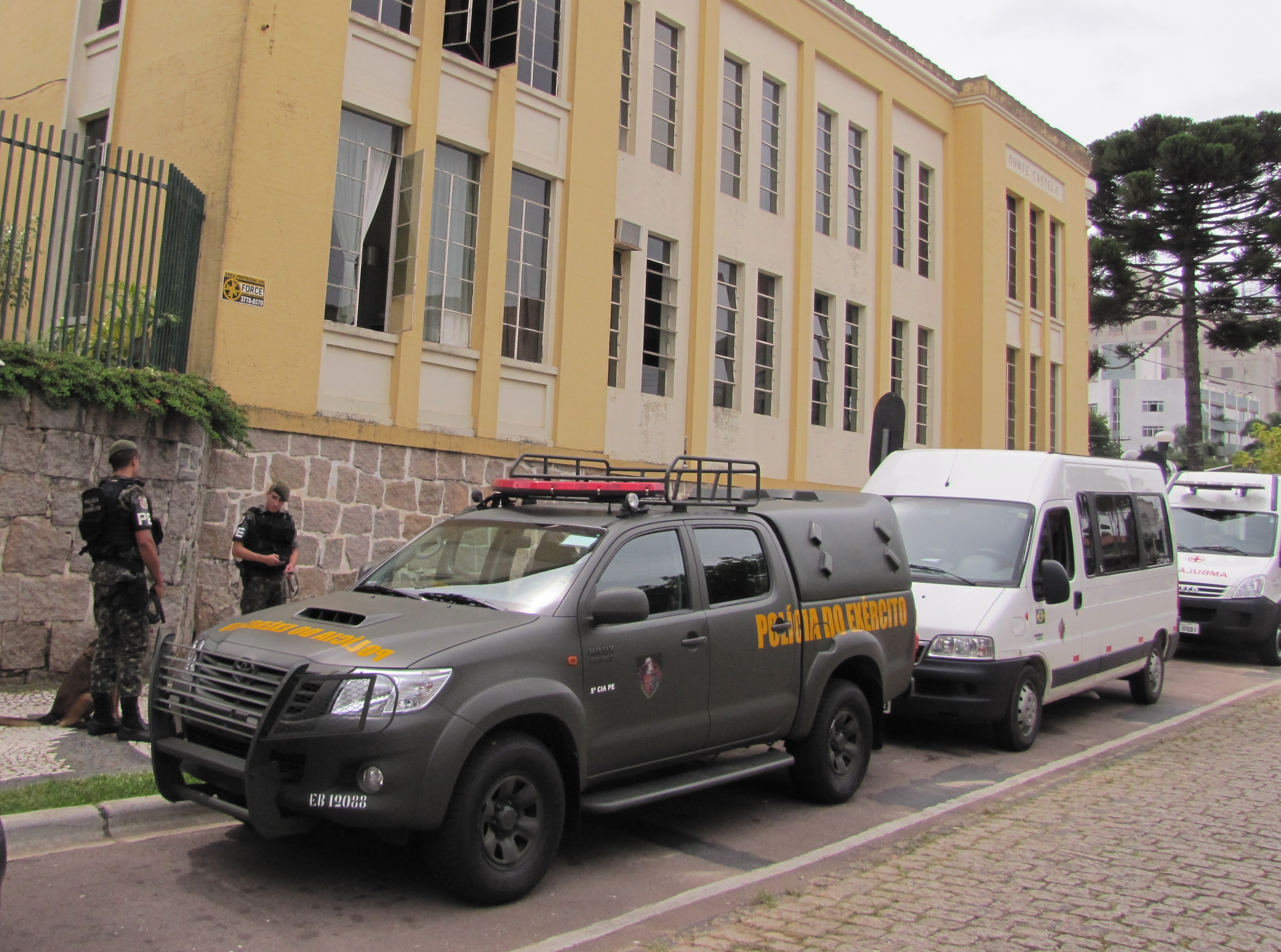
Brazilian Army Police Toyota Hilux of the 5ª Companhia de Polícia do Exército

The activities undertaken by the PE are as follows:

- Ensure compliance with the law, orders, and compliance with military regulations;
- Prevent crime
- Perform routine investigations in the Army;
- Traffic police and staff;
- Traffic control in military areas;
- Security of military installations and offices;
- Escort of senior officials and military convoys;
- Safety and security of military and civilian personnel;
- Criminal investigations;
- Guard prisoners at the disposal of military justice;
- Skill variety:
  - scientific examinations;
  - expert report of traffic accident;
  - examinations in firearms;
  - expert report on the projectile from a firearm, and
  - examination of gunpowder residue;
  - simulated reproduction of facts;
  - technical report describing the scene;
  - expert report Papiloscopia;
  - expert report of assessment material.
- Control Disorders;
- Evacuation, control and custody of a prisoner of war;
- Arrest of deserters and escaped prisoners;
- Control of movement of civilian traffic;
- Escort convoys;
- Control of the area of public calamity, and
- Rear area security and occupation in case of war.

== Army Police units ==
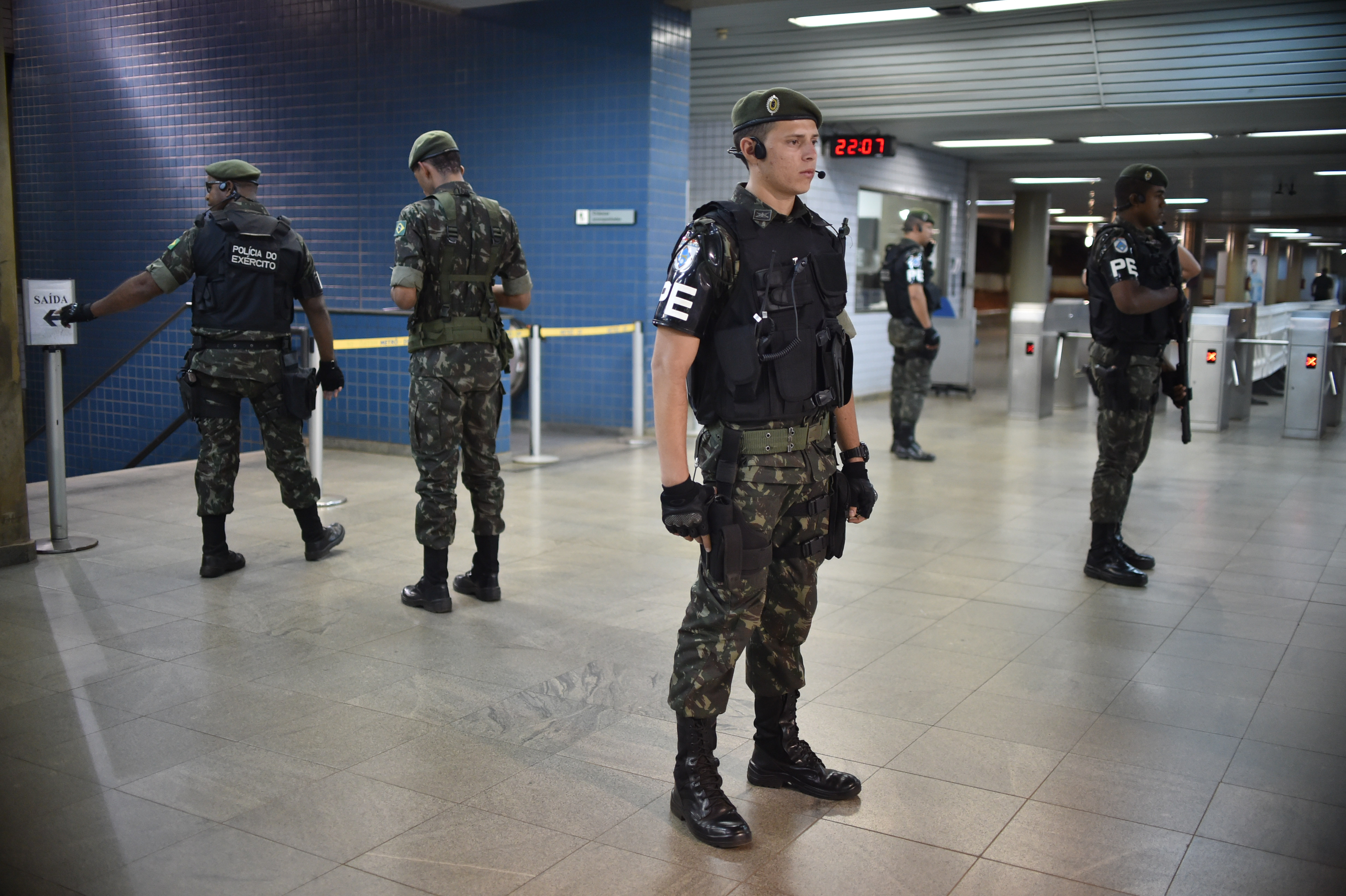
Anti-terrorism training by the army police.

Unit	Headquarters
33º Pelotão de Polícia do Exército	Marabá
12ª Companhia de Polícia do Exército	Manaus
22º Pelotão de Polícia do Exército	São Gabriel da Cachoeira
34º Pelotão de Polícia do Exército	Tefé
17º Pelotão de Polícia do Exército	Porto Velho
32º Pelotão de Polícia do Exército	Boa Vista
1º Batalhão de Polícia do Exército	Rio de Janeiro
1ª Companhia de Polícia do Exército	Rio de Janeiro
22º Pelotão de Polícia do Exército	Niterói
36º Pelotão de Polícia do Exército Pára-quedista	Rio de Janeiro
5º Pelotão de Polícia do Exército	Rio de Janeiro
9º Pelotão de Polícia do Exército –	Rio de Janeiro
4ª Companhia de Polícia do Exército	Belo Horizonte
35º Pelotão de Polícia do Exército	Juiz de Fora
Companhia de Polícia do Exército da 6ª Região Militar	Salvador
10º Pelotão de Polícia do Exército	Recife
4ª Batalhão de Polícia do Exército	Recife
7º Pelotão de Polícia do Exército	Natal
14º Companhia de Polícia do Exército	Campo Grande
4º Pelotão de Polícia do Exército	Dourados
13º Pelotão de Polícia do Exército	Cuiabá
Batalhão de Polícia do Exército de Brasília	Brasília
6º Pelotão de Polícia do Exército	Goiânia
11º Pelotão de Polícia do Exército	Campinas
12º Pelotão de Polícia do Exército	Caçapava
2º Batalhão de Polícia do Exército	Osasco
1º Pelotão de Polícia do Exército	Santiago
2º Pelotão de Polícia do Exército	Uruguaiana
26º Pelotão de Polícia do Exército	Santa Maria
3º Batalhão de Polícia do Exército	Porto Alegre
3º Pelotão de Polícia do Exército	Bagé
8º Pelotão de Polícia do Exército	Pelotas
25º Pelotão de Polícia do Exército	Ponta Grossa
5ª Companhia de Polícia do Exército	Curitiba
14º Pelotão de Polícia do Exército	Florianópolis

== See also ==
- Military Police
- Army Police (Portugal)
- Batalhão de Polícia do Exército (Brasil)
- Polícia Aérea
- Polícia Naval
- Polícia Judiciária Militar
- Polícia da Aeronáutica
- Companhia de Polícia do Batalhão Naval
