= Yamaha XTZ 750 =

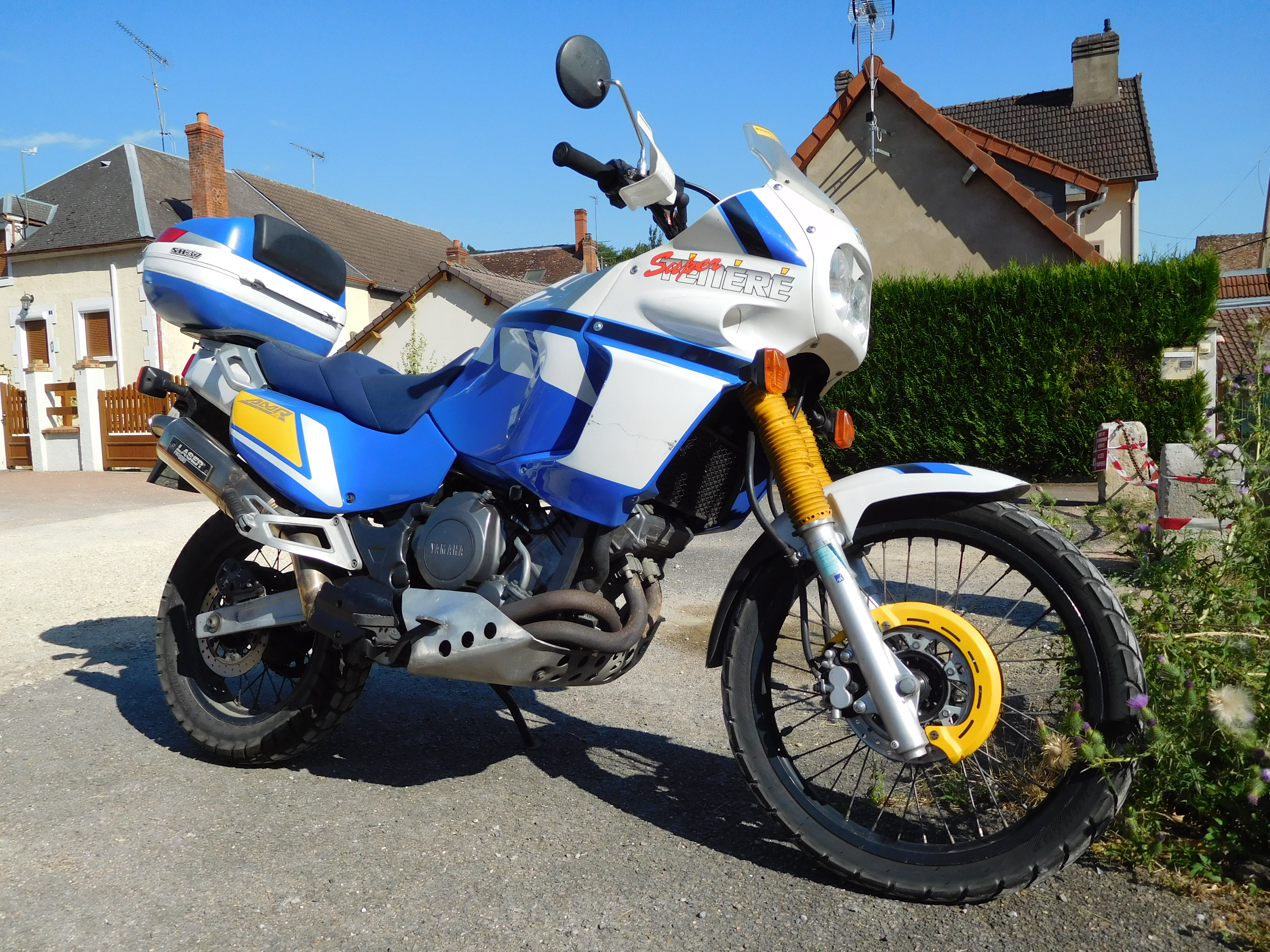
- Manufacturer: Yamaha Motor Company
- Production: 1989–1996
- Successor: Yamaha TDM850
- Class: Dual Purpose Adventure
- Engine: 749 cc (45.7 cu in) four-stroke, liquid cooled, parallel twin cylinder, DOHC, 5 valves per cylinder
- Bore / stroke: 87 mm × 63 mm (3.4 in × 2.5 in)
- Compression ratio: 9.5:1
- Top speed: 119 mph (192 km/h)
- Power: 51 kW (69 hp)
- Torque: 66 N⋅m (49 lb⋅ft)
- Transmission: 5-speed, chain
- Frame type: Steel, single cradle frame
- Suspension: Front: telescopic fork Rear: monoshock with adjustable preload compression damping adjustment
- Brakes: Front: dual 245mm discs Rear: single 236mm disc
- Tires: Front: 90/90-21; Rear: 140/80-17
- Wheelbase: 1,505 mm (59.3 in)
- Dimensions: L: 2,285 mm (90.0 in); W: 815 mm (32.1 in); H: 1,355 mm (53.3 in)
- Seat height: 865 mm (34.1 in)
- Weight: 203.0 kg (447.5 lb) (dry)
- Fuel capacity: 26 L (5.7 imp gal; 6.9 US gal)

The Yamaha XTZ750 Super Ténéré is a dual-sport motorcycle, produced by Yamaha beginning in 1989. It was named after Yamaha's lighter, single-cylinder models, which in turn were named after the notorious Ténéré desert stage of the former Paris-Dakar Rally in northeastern Niger.

== Background ==
The XTZ 750 is a larger, twin-cylinder version of the single-cylinder Yamaha XTZ 660 Ténéré. The XTZ 660 and XTZ 750 models superseded the smaller, air-cooled Yamaha XT 600Z Ténéré. First sold in 1989, the Super Ténéré used a new Yamaha engine design with a DOHC 5-valve cylinder head and a 360 degree crankshaft. A solid protective guard around the engine prevents damage.

The front brake disks of the XTZ are provided with plastic covers. For normal road use these covers are beneficial, but they can make cooling of the brake disks more difficult when riding downhill. Owners appreciate the machine for its comfort and solid feel, plus the long-range fuel tank of 26 litres (5.7 imp gal; 6.9 US gal). Accessories remain common for this model.

The XTZ 750 was discontinued in 1996, but not before the Dakar version YZE 750 won the Dakar race in 1991, plus six more times as the YZE 850T.
