= Yamaha TDM850 =

Yamaha TDM 850
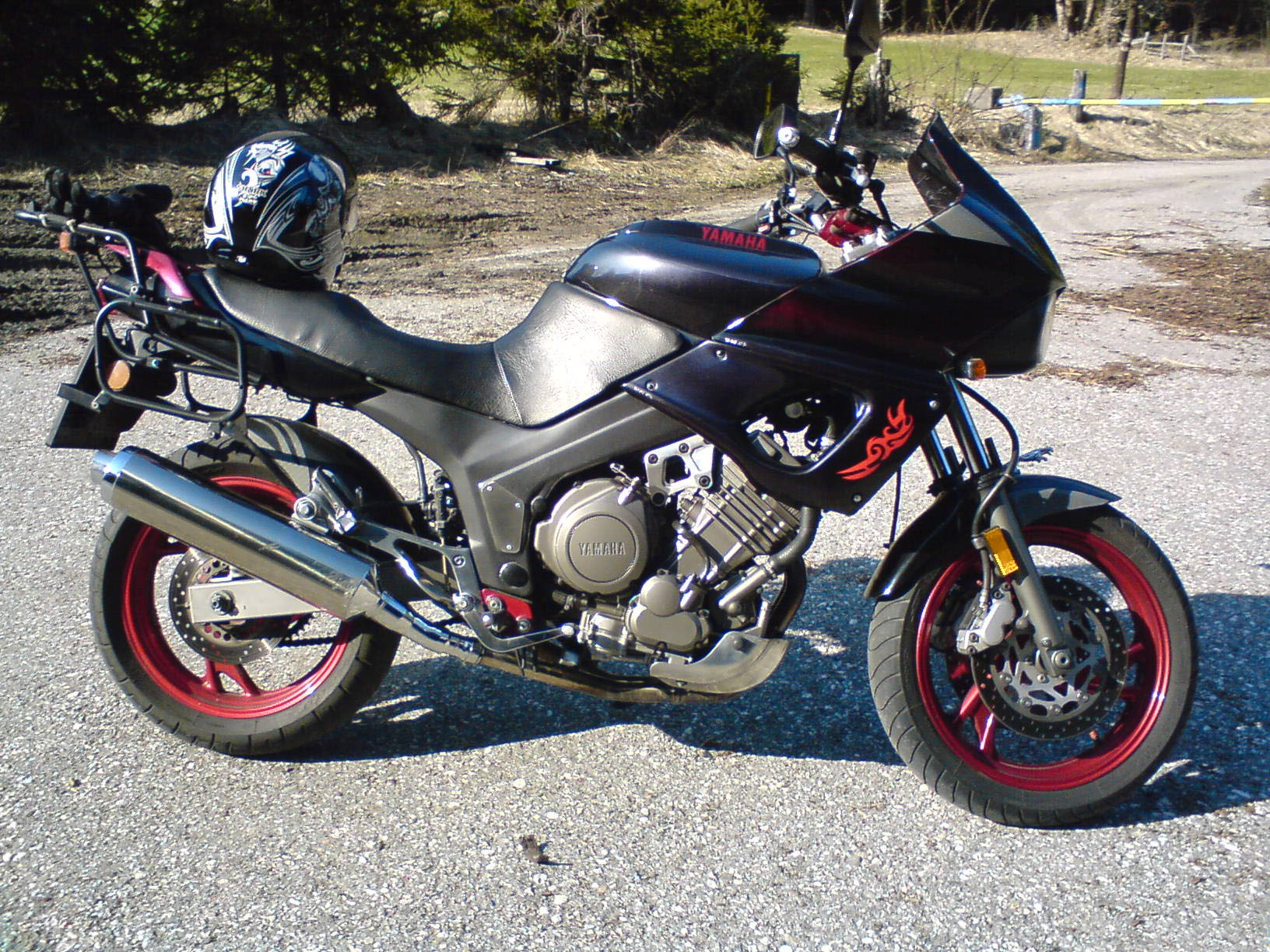
- Manufacturer: Yamaha Motor Company
- Also called: TDM
- Production: 1991- 2001
- Predecessor: XTZ 750 Super Tenere
- Successor: Yamaha TDM 900
- Class: Sport touring
- Engine: 849.3 cc (51.83 cu in); Mk I: liquid-cooled multi-valve parallel-twin 360-degree cranks; Mk II: crossplane parallel-twin 270-degree crank
- Bore / stroke: 89.5 mm × 67.5 mm (3.5 in × 2.7 in)
- Top speed: 130 mph (210 km/h)
- Power: 57 kW (77 hp)
- Torque: 80 N⋅m (59 lb⋅ft)
- Transmission: 5-speed manual
- Seat height: 795 mm (31.3 in)
- Fuel capacity: 20 L (4.4 imp gal; 5.3 US gal)

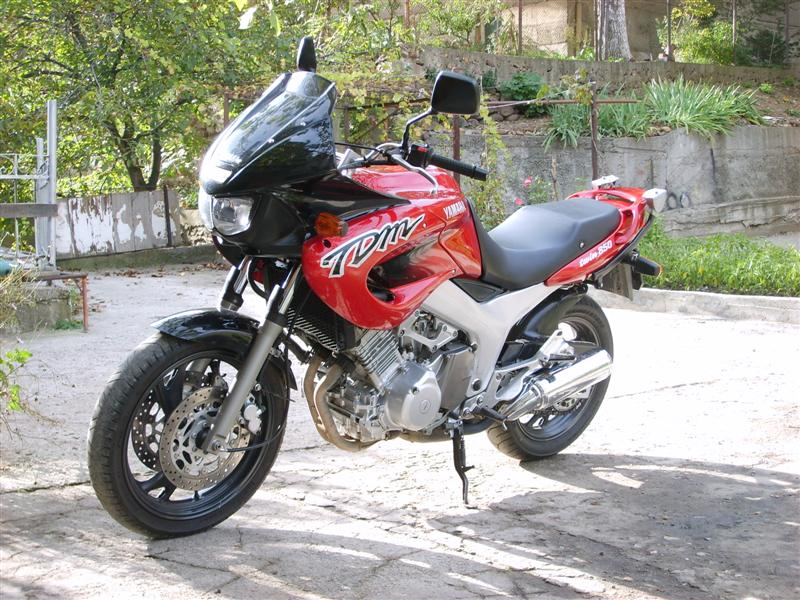
Yamaha TDM850 Mk II with 270° engine

The Yamaha TDM is an 849 cc DOHC parallel-twin motorcycle that heralded the modern "Sport touring" category. The TDM was first manufactured by the Yamaha Motor Company of Japan in 1991. The TDM has a pressed-steel frame and a dry sump engine with five valves per cylinder, (three inlet and two exhaust).

== History ==
The TDM was arguably the first road-oriented "Adventure Sports" motorcycle. It was not intended as an off-road machine, but as a comfortable yet manoeuvrable all-rounder, rather like the Ducati Multistrada of later years.

The TDM's engine was derived from the Paris Dakar winning Yamaha XTZ 750 Super Tenere. Yamaha intended to create a motorcycle capable of handling European mountain roads and coping with rougher road surfaces. The TDM's upright riding position seemed radical in its day.

The TDM was imported into the United States for only two years, 1992 and 1993. It was never a big seller in the United Kingdom nor at first in The Netherlands, but sales were strong in other European countries, particularly in France, Germany and Greece..

In 1996, instead of the previous 360 engine Yamaha released the Mk II TDM with updated bodywork and a 270° firing order engine that was shared with the TRX850, they also shared the same transmission. This new engine was first seen in 1995, when Yamaha introduced its TRX850 in Japan.

Although early models came with no fuel gauge and a reserve fuel tap, beginning in 1999, Yamaha replaced the temperature gauge on the dashboard with a fuel gauge.

== Successor ==
In 2001 the TDM850 was succeeded by the TDM 900, a more powerful bike with a similar concept to the 850. The TDM900 featured new bodywork, a diamond-shaped alloy frame, a 6-speed gearbox, fuel-injection, R1-derived brakes, a reduced dry weight of 190 kg, a larger-capacity 900 cc engine, and slightly wider tyres (160 mm rear, 120 mm front). It has a 2-position trip meter, a digital clock, and digital fuel meter. ABS was available as an option. The engine has a maximum power output of 84.8 hp (63.2 kW) @ 7,500 rpm and torque 65.49 lb⋅ft (88.79 N⋅m) @ 7,500 rpm (claimed).

== Reception ==
MCN said of the TDM850 Mk II: "Fairly revolutionary when launched and certainly years ahead of its time, the Yamaha TDM850 was a sort of Multistrada 12 years before Ducati thought of it. As a serious ‘street trailie allrounder' it’s pretty effective too. The later 900 is better, but the Yamaha TDM850 is still decent, good value, different, and largely overlooked".
