= Yamaha TDM 900 =

TDM 900
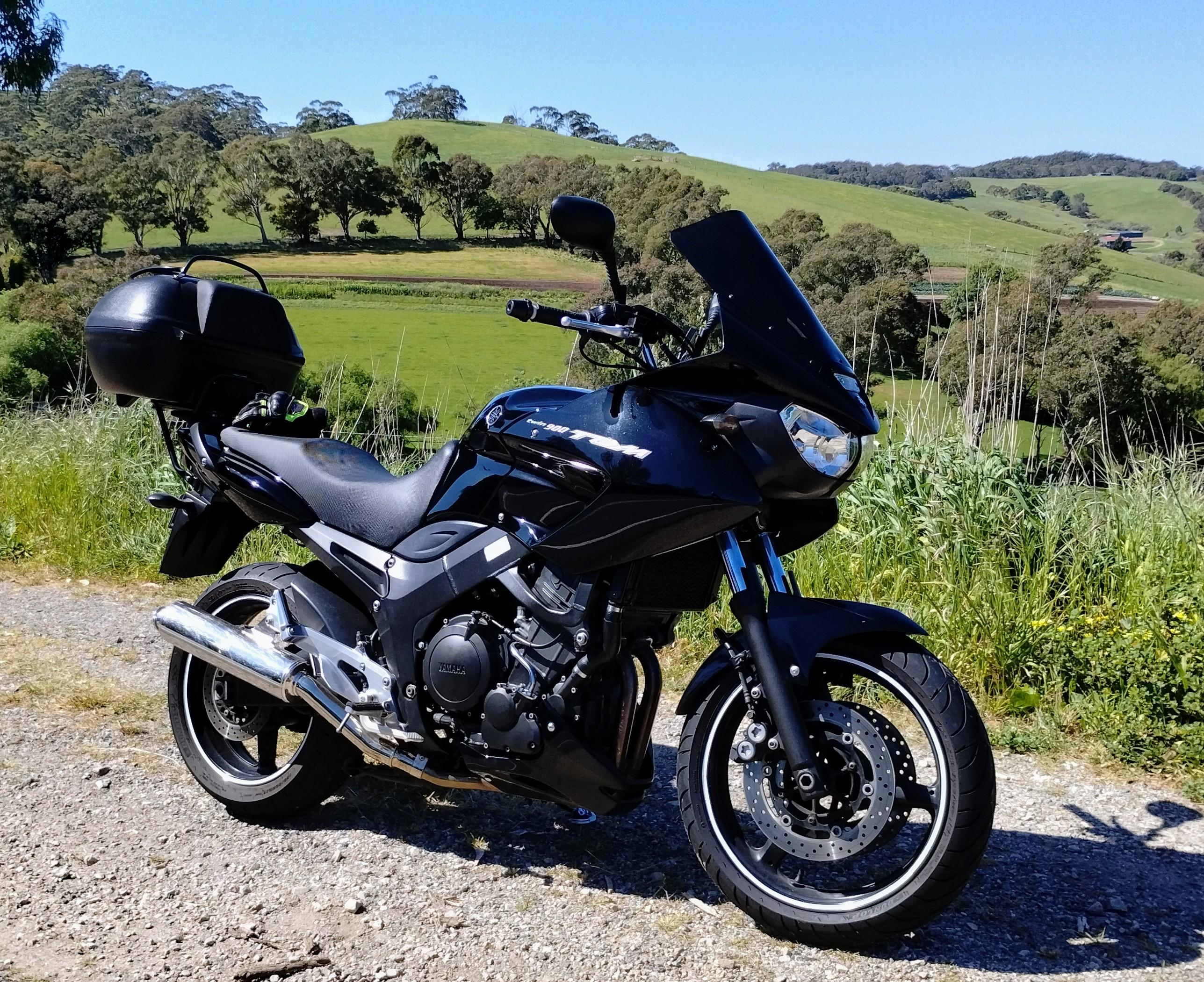
- 2008 Yamaha TDM 900
- Manufacturer: Yamaha Motor Company
- Parent company: Yamaha Corporation
- Production: 2002–2011
- Predecessor: TDM 850
- Successor: Yamaha Tracer 900
- Class: Sport touring
- Engine: 897 cc (54.7 cu in) Forward-inclined parallel 2-cylinder, liquid-cooled, 4-stroke, DOHC, 5-valves
- Bore / stroke: 92 mm × 67.5 mm (3.62 in × 2.66 in)
- Compression ratio: 10.4 : 1
- Top speed: 139 mph (224 km/h)
- Power: 64 kW (86 hp)
- Torque: 81 N⋅m (60 lb⋅ft)
- Ignition type: TCI
- Transmission: Constant Mesh, 6-speed
- Frame type: Aluminium Deltabox, Diamond
- Suspension: Front: Telescopic forks Rear:Swingarm, (link suspension), Monoshock
- Brakes: Front: Hydraulic dual disc, 298 mm (11.7 in). Rear: Hydraulic single disc, 245 mm (9.6 in)
- Tires: Front: 120/70 ZR18M/C (59W). Rear: 160/60 ZR17M/C (69W)
- Rake, trail: 25 degrees / 114 mm (4.5 in)
- Wheelbase: 1,485 mm (58.5 in)
- Dimensions: L: 2,180 mm (86 in); W: 800 mm (31 in); H: 1,290 mm (51 in)
- Seat height: 825 mm (32.5 in)
- Weight: 223 kg (491 lb) (wet)
- Fuel capacity: 20 L (4.4 imp gal; 5.3 US gal)
- Oil capacity: 4,690 ml (4.96 US qt)

The Yamaha TDM 900 is a twin-cylinder engine sport touring motorcycle produced by Yamaha Motor Company between 2002 and 2011. It represents the third and final generation of the TDM series.

== History ==
The TDM series originated in the early 1990s with the launch of the TDM 850 in 1992. The concept behind the model was to create a motorcycle suitable for varying road conditions, particularly narrow, uneven roads common in mountainous regions. The TDM 850 gained a following in European markets, particularly in France, where riders had already begun modifying dual-sport motorcycles for road use.

In 1996, Yamaha introduced significant updates to the TDM 850, including a revised engine, chassis modifications, and updated styling. These changes contributed to its increased popularity, especially in markets like Italy.

By 2002, the model was redesigned and relaunched as the TDM 900. Yamaha aimed to retain the core functionality of the previous model while updating the design and performance to meet a wide range of changing road surface conditions, from winding mountain roads to cobblestone-paved town streets. According to Yamaha's product planning team, the intention was to maintain the TDM’s original use case while improving overall capability and longevity.

=== Design and Engineering ===
The TDM 900 featured a new frame, engine enhancements, and updated electronics compared to its predecessor. The development team focused on preserving the characteristics that had defined the TDM series—versatility and road handling—while integrating technological improvements made over the prior decade.

The design goal for the TDM 900 emphasized long-distance touring and performance on winding or uneven roads, particularly those found in alpine or mountainous regions. Though the overall concept remained consistent with earlier models, the TDM 900 was developed as a completely new motorcycle in terms of engineering and construction.

== Characteristics ==
=== Engine ===
The most obvious change is the increased displacement, resulting in more power 84.8 hp (63.2 kW)@ 7,500 rpm and torque 65.49 lb⋅ft (88.79 N⋅m) @ 7,500 rpm). In combination with fuel injection, the new engine pulls TDM much stronger. It is a pleasure to accelerate out of tiny hairpin corners and feel the mighty twin's power resulting in forward propulsion. In the past, TDM riders commented that the gearbox was a bit loud and harsh. That has been taken seriously, and a totally new, 6-speed gearbox has been developed. It shifts smoothly, and when in last gear, the bike runs at lower rpm and higher speed comfortably on highway sections.

Innovation: adjustable air induct and fuel injection strengthen the parallel twin character

Etsuo Matsuki and his team developed another interesting feature to increase TDM engine torque and power: A variable intake duct effectively brings out the full potential of the new injection system. The air cleaner box will automatically adjust the air intake volume in accordance with engine rpm. Below 4000rpm the duct closes down about one-third of the intake area. The result is amazing: when suddenly opening the throttle, the new 900 twin pulls stronger than ever without any hesitation. And with the help of the injection system even on high mountain roads (up to 3000 meters) the fuel mixture is always adjusted properly. Riders who use their bike often on higher altitude, will fully understand and appreciate these benefits. A 3-way catalytic converter is standard and reduces emissions effectively in the background.

The new aluminium frame is 6 kg lighter and increased 40% in torsional stiffness.

=== Chassis ===
To improve the handling character, the engineers reduced weight in every possible area of the bike. The steel frame was replaced by a newly designed aluminium construction, which does not only have higher stiffness but also 6 kg of weight less at the same time. In combination with the rigid mounted new engine the torsional stiffness increased by 40%.

As a result, the new TDM 900 feels more like a street bike when it comes down to pointing a line around corners. In particular in fast corners at higher speed the bike shows increased precision in following the riders input through the handlebars, which is transmitted by wider radial tyres on both front and rear YZF-R6 lightweight wheels. On the other hand, the long suspension stroke and setting still ensures a pleasant absorption of bumps, making the bike a first choice for critical surface conditions.

The increased steering accuracy is also a result of the improved weight distribution. The 30° mounting angle (instead of 40° on previous TDM) of engine and cylinders and other dimension changes enabled the engineers to achieve a favourable weight distribution of 47% to 49,8% on the front wheel. Project leader Etsuo Matsuki also utilized knowledge from development of supersport machines. The longer rear swingarm with a YZF-R1 piggy-back rear suspension contributes to stability and accuracy. Yamaha's well known MOS 64 opposed piston one-piece callipers will withstand the toughest downhill pass road ride. even with a passenger on the back and a tank bag in front of you.

=== Differences between the TDM850 ===
Comfort is part of the TDM concept. The new body shape incorporates the rider in a slightly more forward position to give them a better direct control feeling of the front end. The designers however took great care at the same time to leave plenty of freedom for the rider to find the most suitable position for themself.

Even though the new bike has a complete new body shape, it still is a TDM. Takeshi Umemoto from GK Dynamics was responsible for the new looks and believes: "TDM is simply TDM; an entity in itself. We knew an important point would be to carry on that TDM identity. So during the development we attempted to create a design that introduced new creative forms within the basic context."

Prior to the release of the TDM 900 62,000 motorcyclists all across Europe have bought a Yamaha TDM850.

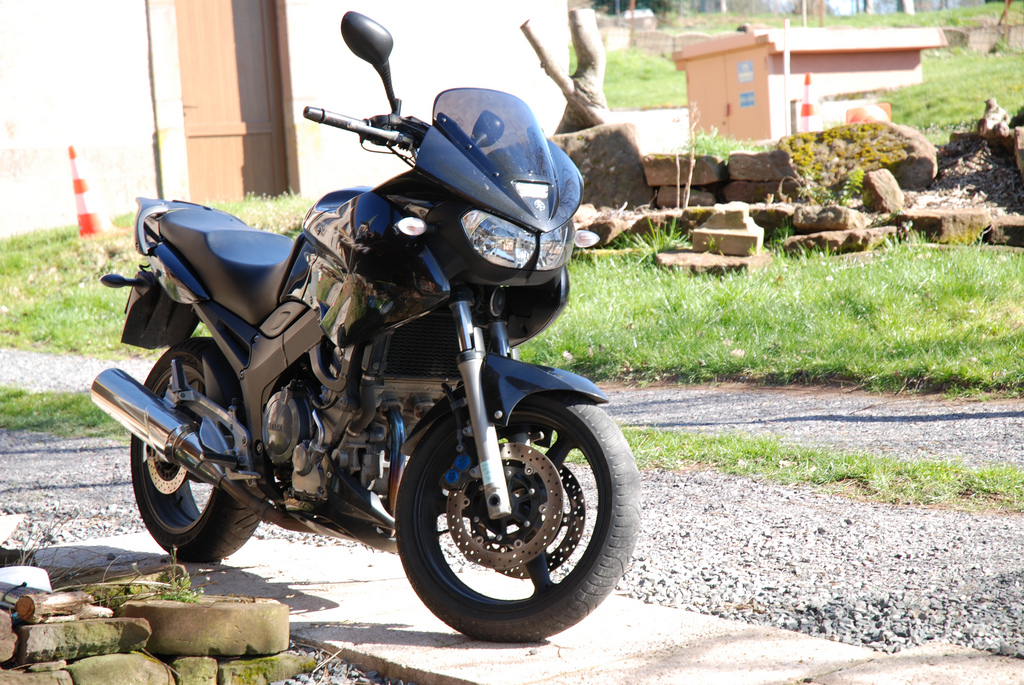
Yamaha TDM 900

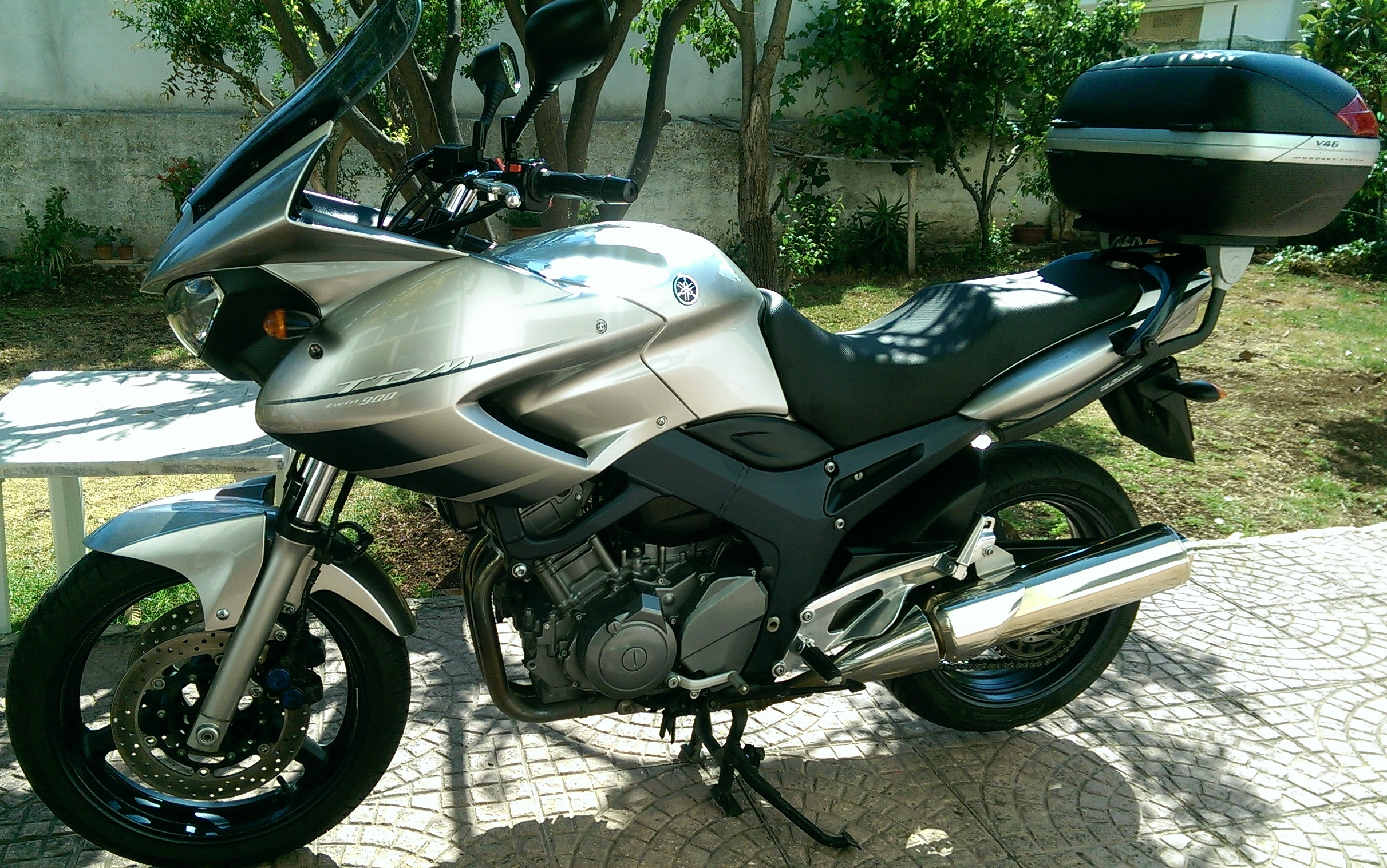
Yamaha TDM 900 silver
