= Dry sump =

Method of internal combustion engine lubrication with oil held in a separate reservoir

Schematic diagram of a basic dry-sump engine lubrication system. The oil collects in the sump (1), is withdrawn continuously by the scavenge pump (2), and travels to the oil tank (3), where gases entrained in the oil separate and the oil cools. Gases (6) are returned to the sump. A pressure pump (4) forces the de-gassed and cooled oil (5) back to the engine's lubrication points (7).

A dry sump system is a method to manage the lubricating motor oil in four-stroke and large two-stroke reciprocating internal combustion engines. The dry sump system uses two or more oil pumps and a separate oil reservoir, as opposed to a conventional wet sump system, which uses only the main sump (U.S.: oil pan) below the engine and a single pump. A dry sump engine requires a pressure relief valve to regulate negative pressure inside the engine so that internal seals are not inverted.

Dry sump lubrication is common on larger diesel engines such as those used in ships, as well as gasoline engines used in racing cars, aerobatic aircraft, high-performance personal watercraft, and motorcycles. Dry sumps may be chosen for these applications due to increased reliability, oil capacity, reduction of oil starvation under high g-loads, or other technical or performance reasons. Dry sumps may be unsuitable for some applications, usually due to their increased cost, complexity, or bulk.

== Design ==
Engines are both lubricated and cooled by oil that circulates throughout the engine, feeding various bearings and other moving parts and then draining, via gravity, into the sump at the base of the engine. In the wet-sump system of nearly all production automobile engines, oil that is not actively circulating is in the sump. A pump collects oil from the sump and directly circulates it back through the engine. In a dry-sump system, oil still collects at the base of the engine, but into a much smaller sump, where one or more scavenge pumps draw it away and transfer it to a (usually external) reservoir, where it is both cooled and de-aerated before being recirculated through the engine by a pressure pump. The reservoir is usually tall, narrow, and designed with the oil outlet at the very bottom and baffles above the outlet, for uninhibited oil supply even during sloshing.

Dry sump pump operation consists of a pressure stage and a scavenging stage. Although the term "stages" is commonly used to describe the work of the multiple pumps, they typically run in parallel rather than in series as might be implied by the term. The pressure stage draws oil from the bottom of the reservoir and passes it through the filter and into the engine itself. An adjustable pressure regulator ensures that oil pressure is kept stable at different engine speeds. The dry-sump system requires at least two pumps – one pressure and one scavenge – and sometimes as many as four or five scavenge pumps are used to minimize the amount of oil in the sump. The pressure pump and scavenge pumps are frequently mounted on a common crankshaft, so that a single pulley at the front of the system can run as many oil pumps as the engine design requires. It is common practice to have one scavenge pump per crankcase section; however, in the case of inverted engines (typically aircraft engines), it is necessary to employ separate scavenge pumps for each cylinder bank. Therefore, an inverted V engine would have a minimum of two scavenge pumps and one pressure pump.

Dry sump systems may optionally be designed to keep the engine's crankcase at lower than atmospheric pressure (i.e. a partial vacuum) by sealing the crankcase and allowing the scavenge pumps to draw out both oil and gases. Pressure equilibrium in such an engine will be reached when the rate of gases entering the crankcase (blow-by gases past the piston rings, but also air leaks and oil vapor) equals the rate of gas removal from the scavenge pump capacity beyond what is required to remove just the oil. Alternatively, the crankcase may be kept near atmospheric pressure by venting it to the oil reservoir, which in turn is vented into the engine's air intake or to outside air.

== Advantages ==
A dry-sump system offers many advantages over a wet-sump. The primary advantages include:

- Prevention of oil starvation during high g-loads when oil sloshes, which improves engine reliability. Most engines can be damaged by even brief periods of oil starvation. This is the reason why dry-sumps were invented, and is particularly valuable in racing cars, high-performance sports cars, and aerobatic aircraft that regularly experience high accelerations. Oil slosh occurs in dry-sump systems too, but it is much easier to design a remote reservoir to tolerate high amounts of slosh.
- Increased oil capacity by using a large external reservoir, which would be impractical in a wet-sump system.
- Improvements to vehicle handling and stability. The vehicle's center of gravity can be lowered by mounting the (typically very heavy) engine lower in the chassis due to a shallow sump profile. A vehicle's overall weight distribution can be modified by locating the external oil reservoir away from the engine.
- Improved oil temperature control. This is due to increased oil volume providing resistance to heat saturation, the positioning of the oil reservoir away from the hot engine, and the ability to include cooling capabilities between the scavenger pumps and oil reservoir, and also within the reservoir itself.
- Improved oil quality. When oil sloshes against the crankshaft and other high-speed spinning parts, it causes a "hurricane that whips the oil in a wet-sump engine into an aerated froth like a milkshake in a blender". Aerated oil lubricates engine components far less effectively. A dry-sump system minimizes oil aeration, and also de-aerates oil far more effectively by pumping it first into a remote reservoir.
- Increased engine power. In a wet-sump engine, oil sloshing against spinning parts causes substantial viscous drag, which in turn creates parasitic power loss. A dry-sump system removes oil from the crankcase along with the possibility of such viscous drag. More complex dry-sump systems may scavenge oil from other areas where oil may pool, such as in the valvetrain. Power can be further increased if the dry-sump system is designed to create a vacuum inside the crankcase, which reduces air drag (or 'windage') as well.
- Improved pump efficiency to maintain oil supply to the engine. Since scavenge pumps are typically mounted at the lowest point on the engine, the oil flows into the pump intake by gravity rather than having to be lifted up into the intake of the pump as in a wet-sump system. Furthermore, scavenge pumps can be of a design that is more tolerant of entrapped gasses than the typical pressure pump, which can lose suction if too much air mixes into the oil. Since the pressure pump is typically lower than the external oil tank, it always has a positive pressure on its suction regardless of cornering forces.
- Having the pumps external to the engine makes them easier to maintain or replace.

== Disadvantages ==
Dry-sump engines have several disadvantages compared to wet-sump engines, including;

- Added cost, complexity, and weight.
- Additional oil and maintenance required by the additional pumps and lines.
- Difficulty in positioning the external reservoir and pumps around the engine, and within the engine bay, due to their size.
- As wrist pins and pistons rely on the oil being splashed around in the crankcase for lubrication and cooling respectively, these parts might have inadequate oiling if too much oil is pulled away by the pump. Installing piston oilers can circumvent this issue, but adds further cost and complexity.
- Inadequate upper valvetrain lubrication if too much oil vapor is being pulled out from the area, especially with multi-staged pumps.

== Common applications ==
Dry sumps are common on larger diesel engines such as those used for ship propulsion, largely due to increased reliability and serviceability. They are also commonly used in racing cars and aerobatic aircraft due to problems with g-forces, reliable oil supply, power output, and vehicle handling. The C6, C7, and C8 generations of the Chevrolet Corvette Z06 use dry sump lubrication, which necessitates an initial oil change after 500 miles (800 km).

=== Motorcycle engines ===
Dry sump lubrication is particularly useful for motorcycles, which tend to be operated more vigorously than other road vehicles. Although many motorcycles such as the Honda CB750 (1969) feature dry sump engines, modern motorcycle engines tend to use a wet sump design (particularly transverse inline-four engines, which are wider and must be mounted fairly high in the frame for ground clearance, so the space below may as well be used for a wet sump). However, narrower engines can be mounted lower and should ideally use dry-sump lubrication.

Several motorcycle models that use dry sumps include:

- The Rotax-engined Aprilia RSV Mille and the Aprilia RST1000 Futura, along with their sister bikes the SL1000 Falco and ETV1000 Caponord.
- All BMW K-series motorcycles with inline-4 engines.
- Classic British parallel twin motorcycles, such as those made by BSA, Triumph, and Norton. Traditionally, the oil tank was a remote item, but some late-model BSAs and Meriden Triumphs had the frame tubing double as the oil reservoir.
- Harley-Davidsons, since the 1930s.
- The Honda NX650, XR500R, XR600R, XR650R and XR650L, with the oil in the frame tubing.
- Chennai-built Royal Enfields prior to 2007. Royal Enfield dry sump designs were completely phased out by 2012.
- The Suzuki DR-Z400, with the oil in the frame tubing.
- The Triumph Rocket 3.
- The Yamaha TRX850. Its oil reservoir is not remote, but integral to the engine, sitting atop the gearbox. This design eliminates external oil lines, allowing for simpler engine removal and faster oil warm-up.
- The Yamaha XT660Z/R/X and Yamaha SR400/500, with the frame tubing serving as the oil reservoir and cooling system.

== See also ==
- Wet sump
