= Yamaha TRX850 =

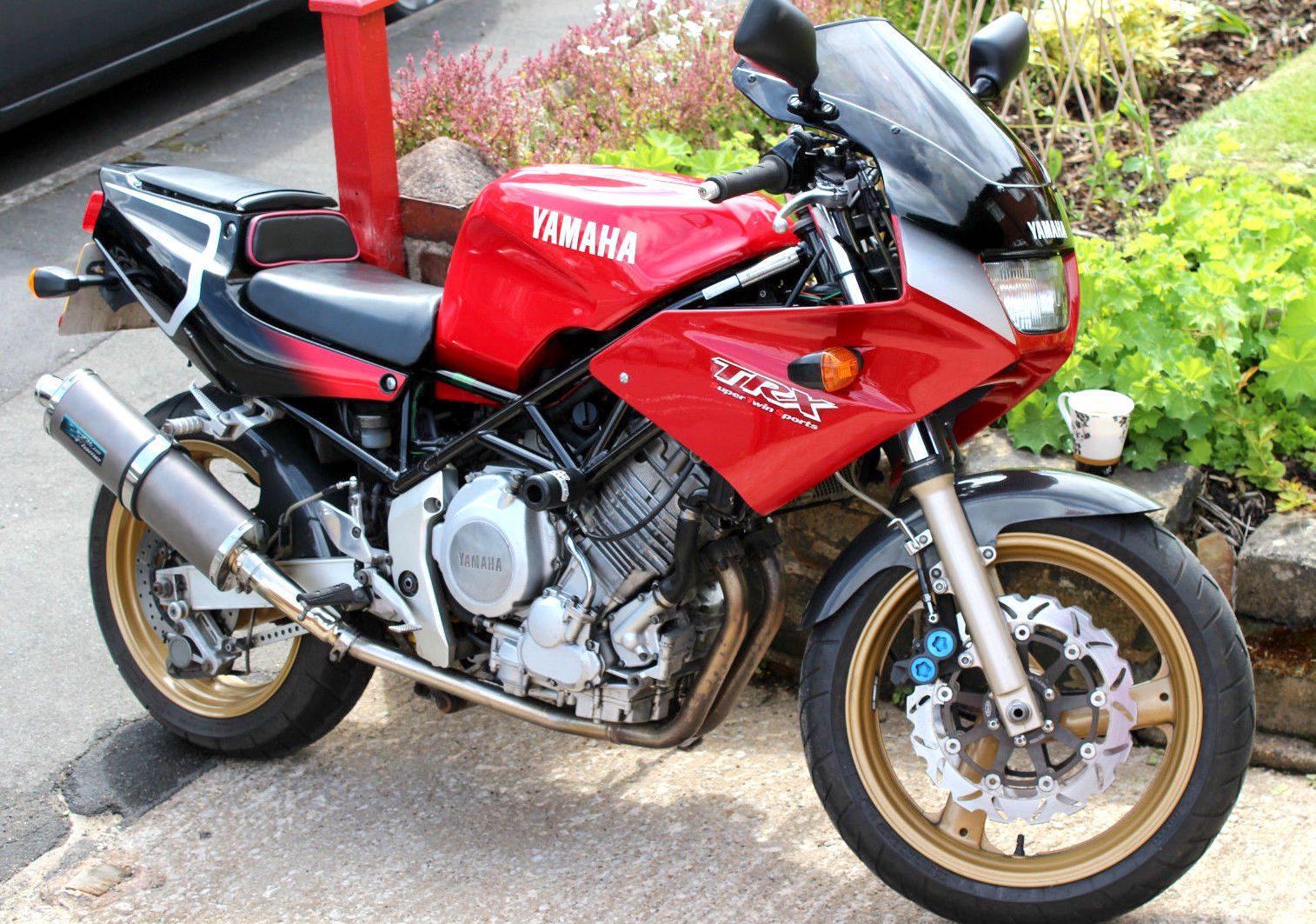
- Manufacturer: Yamaha Motor Company
- Also called: TRX
- Parent company: Yamaha Corporation
- Production: 1995 (Japan only); 1996–2000
- Class: Café racer Sport bike
- Engine: 849 cc (51.8 cu in) liquid-cooled 4-stroke 10-valve DOHC crossplane parallel-twin
- Bore / stroke: 89.5 mm × 67.5 mm (3.52 in × 2.66 in)
- Top speed: 135 mph (217 km/h)
- Power: 59 kW (79 hp) (claimed)
- Torque: 85 N⋅m (63 lb⋅ft) (claimed)
- Transmission: 5-speed constant-mesh
- Wheelbase: 1,435 mm (56.5 in)
- Dimensions: L: 2,070 mm (81 in); W: 700 mm (28 in)
- Seat height: 795 mm (31.3 in)
- Weight: 190 kg (419 lbs) (dry); 202 kg (445 lbs) (wet)
- Fuel capacity: 18 L (4.0 imp gal; 4.8 US gal)
- Related: Yamaha TDM850

The Yamaha TRX850 is a sports motorcycle with a 10-valve DOHC 849 cc 270° parallel-twin engine. First released in Japan in 1995, a version for the European market was available from 1996 to 2000.

== Design and development ==
Animation with different crankshaft angles

The TRX has a half fairing, clip-on handlebars and mildly rear-set footrests. The front forks are conventional telescopics, and the rear suspension is a rising-rate monoshock unit. Effectively a factory-built café racer for a solo rider, there is meagre provision for a pillion passenger.

The TRX engine was derived from that in the Yamaha TDM850, but the TRX is lighter, lower and sportier than its TDM stablemate. The engine has five valves per cylinder, three inlet and two exhaust; the inlets are 26 mm, exhausts 28 mm. Unusually for a dry sump design, the oil tank is not remote, but is integral to the engine, sitting atop the gearbox. This simplifies manufacture, avoids external oil lines, and gives faster oil warm-up. The shallow sump allows the engine to be sited lower, for an optimal CG position. The 360° crankshaft of the original TDM was changed to a 270° crankshaft in 1996, after which time the TRX and the TDM shared the same engine and transmission. The engine has a balance shaft to smooth out residual vibrations.

In 2000 Yamaha stopped making the TRX, while the TDM series, enlarged to 900 cc, remained in production until 2011.

== Reception ==
The TRX was designed to compete in the market with the Ducati 900SS V-twin, whose tubular trellis frame it mimicked. Although developed cheaply from Yamaha's "parts bin", using a TDM850 engine, the TRX performs well and has "a coherent identity of its own".

In Motorcycle News (MCN) said the TRX was "the best-kept secret in motorcycling" and a "forgotten gem", comparing it to the 270° Norton Commando 961. In 2014, Steve Cooper said it is, "Very much the thinking man's sports bike, this slightly oddball twin is beginning to reach cult status and for good reason".

Despite being considerably cheaper than the Ducati, the TRX did not sell well, and production ceased in 2000 with no obvious successor. Although manufacturers have occasionally adopted the parallel-twin format for high-performance sportbikes, (such as the 2004–2007 MZ 1000S and the Métisse Mk5), MCN reported that parallel twins were attracting fewer buyers. Compared to V-twins, parallel twins have fewer components and cost less to manufacture, driving a renewed interest, especially 270° crankshaft twins. Although Visor Down was doubtful, saying, "They're never going to be as popular as inline-fours, they'll never be as iconic as a V-twin, and they'll never have the exotic feel of a triple...". the parallel-twin layout is having something of a revival: the latest Honda Africa Twin is a 270° parallel-twin rather than the earlier V-twin incarnation; and the best-selling Royal Enfield Interceptor 650 has a 270° crank.

== The 270° crankshaft ==
Although the 270° crank concept has been attributed to Vincent Motorcycles' Phil Irving, the TRX was the first production motorcycle to have this design. The 270° crank has an ignition sequence and an engine balance that yields something of the feel of a V-twin. Unlike 180° and 360° parallel-twins, a 270° engine in motion never has both pistons stationary, so its flywheel momentum is continuous. With less vibration than a 360° crankshaft, and a more regular firing pattern than a 180° crankshaft, a 270° crankshaft results in a smoother engine.

Stuart Wood, Triumph's chief engineer, said that a 270° crank was ideal for large-capacity parallel twins, as it "generates fewer of those irritating high frequency secondary vibrations". Since the TRX's demise, the 270° concept has emerged as a successful compromise for standard and cruiser motorcycles.

== Owners' modifications ==
Because of its "parts bin" heritage, some of the TRX's components were barely sufficient for the bike's intended café racer role. As a result, few TRXs remain standard. The most common owner modifications are: race cans to replace the very heavy OE silencers; "Blue Spot" front brake calipers to replace the OE units which lacked power and feel; and braided brake lines to improve the braking.
