= MV Agusta =

Italian motorcycle manufacturer and racing team

Coordinates: 45.8039531°N 8.7774456°E

MV Agusta Motor S.p.A.
- MV Agusta logo
- Type: Private
- Industry: Automotive
- Predecessor: Agusta
- Founded: 12 February 1945, Samarate
- Founder: Giovanni Agusta
- Headquarters: Varese, Italy
- Area served: Worldwide
- Key people: Luca Martin CEO
- Products: Motorcycles
- Owners: Art of Mobility SA
- Subsidiaries: Cagiva
- Website: www.mvagusta.com
- Footnotes slogan: Motorcycle Art. Since 1945.

MV Agusta (Italian pronunciation: [ˌɛmmeˈvi aˈɡusta], full name: MV AGUSTA Motor S.p.A., original name: Meccanica Verghera Agusta or MV) is an Italian high end motorcycle manufacturer. It was founded by Count Domenico Agusta on 19 January 1945 as one of the branches of the Agusta aircraft company near Milan in Cascina Costa. The abbreviation MV stands for Meccanica (mechanics) Verghera, the hamlet where the first MVs were made. The modern headquarters and main production facilities are located in Varese, Italy on the shore of Lake Varese.

== History ==
=== 1943–1945: From idea to mass production ===
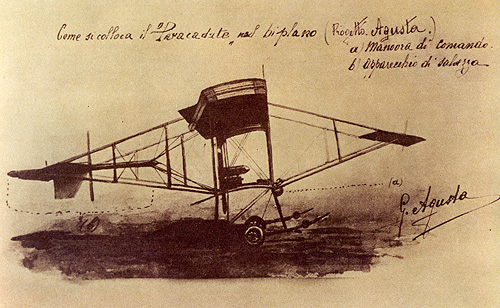
1910 Agusta AG.1 biplane

The genesis of the Agusta company came in the early 20th century. Count Giovanni Agusta left Sicily for northern Italy, where he built his first aircraft, the AG.1, four years after the Wright brothers had made history in the US.

The First World War, which demonstrated the prospects of aviation, prompted Agusta to be decisive. In 1923, in the town of Samarate, he founded the Costruzioni Aeronautiche Giovanni Agusta S.A. (usually shortened to Agusta) aircraft factory. He died in 1927 at the age of 48, leaving his life's work to his wife Giuseppina and his sons, Domenico, Vincenzo, Mario and Corrado.

Aircraft orders were plentiful and business generally went well until 1945, when provisions of the peace treaty that ended World War II (reiterated in the Paris Peace Treaties, 1947), forbid Italy from producing aircraft. Acting quickly to save their business and their employees' jobs, the Agustas turned to an idea formulated by Count Domenico Agusta during the war. Domenico believed that the business could best be diversified and made peaceful by commencing the production of motorcycles, which would be needed by a country gutted by war.

On January 19, 1945, in the town of Cascina Costa (near the Malpensa airport near Milan), a private company, Meccanica Verghera S.r.l., was registered. Using an engine that had been prepared by August 1943—a 98 cc single-cylinder two-stroke with a two-stage gear box—and spare parts obtained from the black market to bypass shortages, a prototype motorcycle was constructed. The prototype was exhibited to the press in late October 1945 at a dealership on Via Piatti in Milan. It was light motorcycle with a steel tube rigid frame, a girder fork, 19-inch wheels, and a gas tank marked with a large M and V. It was initially called "Vespa 98" before being renamed to "MV 98" to avoid confusion with the Vespa motorscooter produced by Piaggio.

The MV 98 was first produced en masse in 1946. Two versions were sold to consumers: Economica, based on the prototype presented a year earlier, and Turismo, distinguished by the presence of a three-speed gearbox and a rear suspension. The Turismo proved to be so overwhelmingly popular that before long, the Economica was discontinued. In 1946, about 50 units were produced.

=== 1945–1980: Agusta family period ===
Count Domenico Agusta had a passion for mechanical workings and for motorcycle racing. Much like Enzo Ferrari, the Agusta family produced and sold motorcycles almost exclusively to fund their racing efforts. So soon after the start of production of its first model MV 98, the company launched its own factory racing program.

The date of the first MV Agusta race is unknown, but the first victory was delivered by Vicenzo Nincioni in the road race held in La Spezia on October 6, 1946. Just a week later, he took the third place in Valenza, where the first place was also taken by the MV racer Mario Cornalea. On November 3, in Monza, MV racers Vicenzo Ninconi, Mario Cornalea and Mario Paleari occupied the entire podium for the first time in MV racing history.

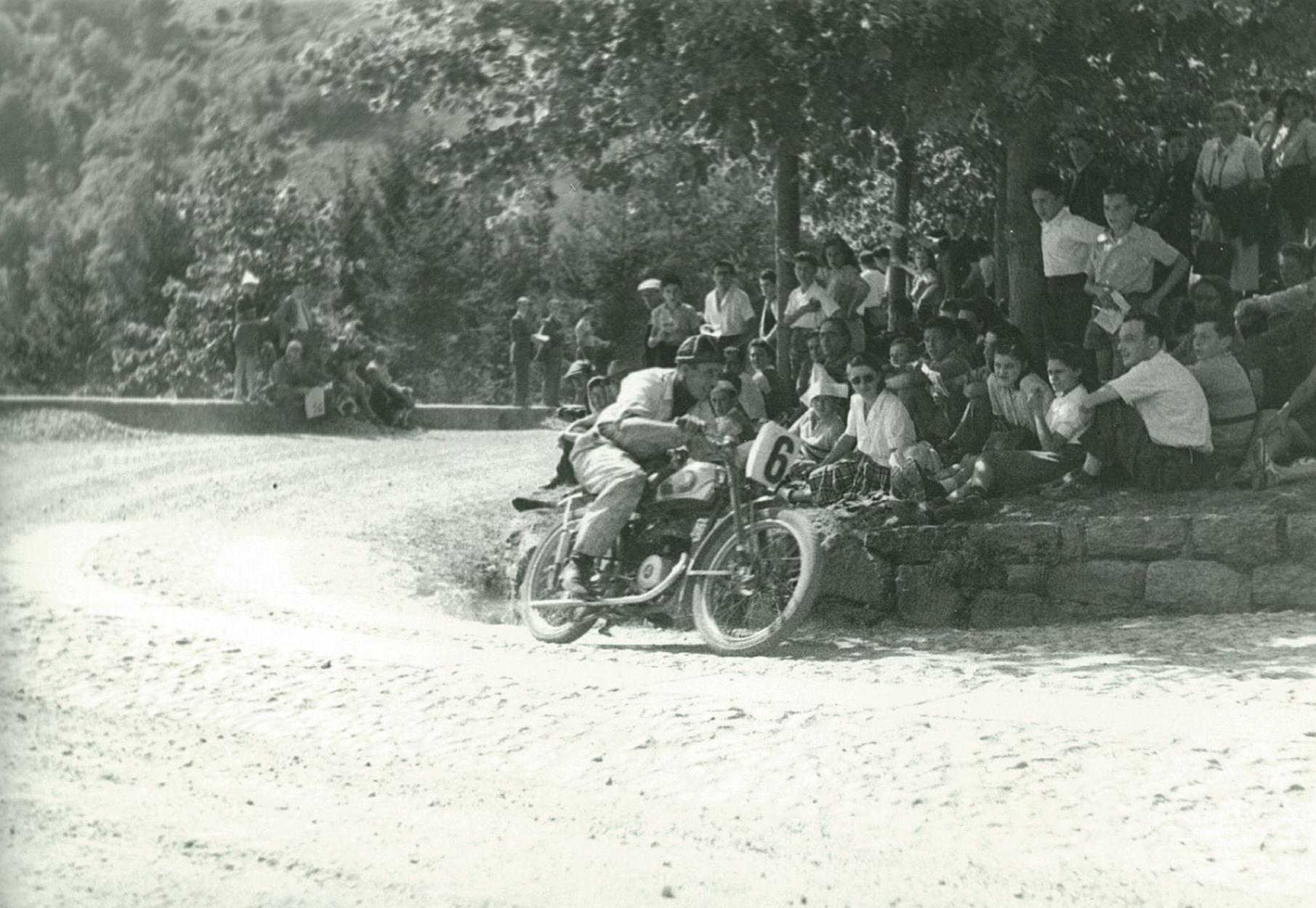
1946 MV Agusta 98 Corsa

In the end of 1946, a special racing motorcycle was assembled at the factory in Caschina Costa. Its main advantages over the serial model 98 were a telescopic fork and a plunger type rear suspension. The frame remained a simple tubular (closed type) and was shortened by 50 mm to improve the handling. The handle bar was narrowed and the rearsets were moved back to make a sportier riding position. The two-stroke engine was improved by enlarging the cylinders ports, raising the compression ratio and installing a new 20 mm horizontal carburetor. The number of gears was increased from two to three. As a result, the power increased to 5 hp at 5,400 rpm, and the maximum speed increased to 95 km/h.

Soon almost all of these improvements were also applied on the production model MV 98. By that time, the capacity of 98 cc was no longer relevant in racing world, which had become more organized and moved on to the classic 125, 250 and 500 cc categories.

In 1947, MV Agusta went to the Milan Trade Fair with a number of new features. In addition to a "Luxury" version of the 98, the two-cylinder, two-stroke 125 cc bikes and the 250 cc single-cylinder 4T bikes appeared.

Technical characteristics of the MV Agusta 250 Turismo were regular for those times. Its single-cylinder engine with compression ratio 6.0:1 produced 11 hp at 4,700 rpm allowing the motorcycle to speed up to 110 km/h. Only 100 units of the MV 250 Turismo were produced within three years.

The model with a 125 cc two-stroke twin engine had a very similar design to the MV 98. The only differences were a four-speed gearbox and two cylinders instead of one. This model was well received by the press as well as by the audience of many motorcycles shows. However this model didn't go to serial production mainly because its high price. Instead of this model MV Agusta launched a more affordable 125 Turismo, which was the result of the development of the original MV 98. It was powered by a 123.5 cc (53 × 56 mm) single-cylinder engine shoving out 4.8 hp and equipped by a girder fork.

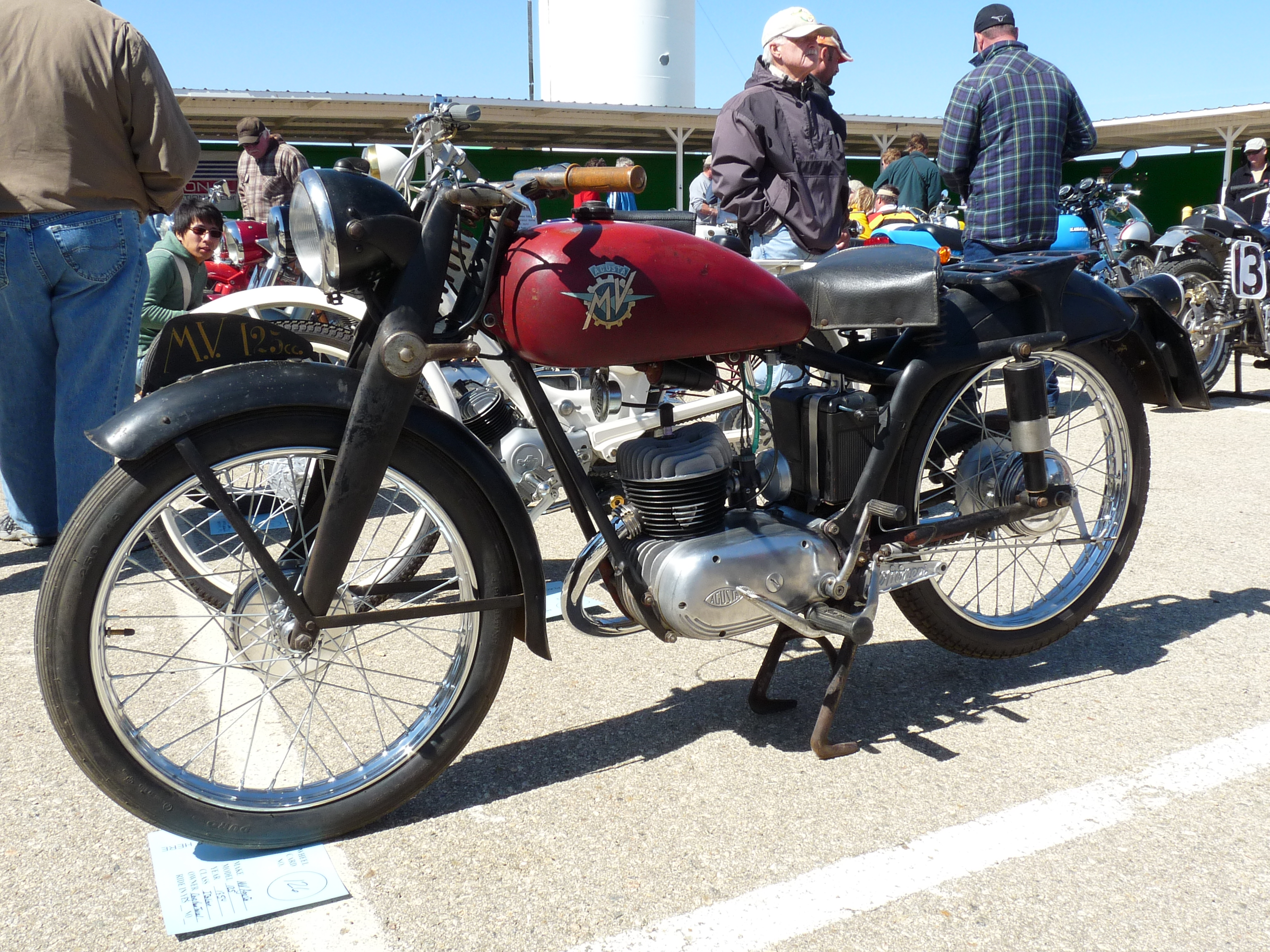
1950 MV Agusta 125 Turismo

Together with the 125 Turismo, MV introduced 125 Corsa designed for national and world championships. The power increased up to 9 hp. Its steel trellis frame, fabricated from thinner tubing, helped to reduce the weight from 75 to 55 kg. Two friction dampers had been added. And both wheels were replaced with 21-inch ones in accordance with the technical regulations of the races.

The bike was good enough to help Franco Bertoni to win the 1948 Grand Prix of Nations at Monza. In the 1949 season, the 125 cc, or ultra-light weight class, gained new prestige. More motorcycle manufacturers were competing in the inaugural world championships that were held in Switzerland, Netherlands and Italy. The Mondial 125 cc DOHC design dominated the 1949 season.

In the end of 1949, Count Domenico Agusta invited two key professionals from Gilera – Piero Remor, who designed Gilera's four-cylinder 500cc racing motorcycle, and Arturo Magni, who was the chief mechanic of the Gilera's racing team. So they repeated a 500 cc four-cylinder engine and designed a racing model with 125 cc DOHC single-cylinder engine. The MV's first 500 – a Gilera clone – made its race debut at Spa-Francorchamps in July 1950, just six months after Remor had put pen to paper in MV's Cascina Costa race shop. After a short twenty-minute run on the factory test bench, ex-Gilera rider Arcisco Artesiani managed a creditable fifth on the untested and ungainly MV 500. His race average speed of 160.66 km/h was impressive, but the remainder of the season proved difficult and the MV failed to live up to expectations. Artesiani's third place at Monza in the Nations Grand Prix was the highlight of the 1950 season, and Artesiani finished eighth overall in the World Championship.

The MV's first racing success came later with the 125cc DOHC four-stroke engine. The 1950 season and 1951 season were development years. Racing efforts only produced a fifth-place finish at the Dutch TT in 1950. The 1951 results were only slightly better. The 1952 season saw the introduction of telescopic forks, full width alloy brake hubs and a sleek fuel tank on the 125 cc race bike. Britain's Cecil Sandford piloted the new MV 125 to a 1952 Isle of Man TT victory and went on to win MV Agusta's first world championship. And in September that year Leslie Graham made Count Agusta the happiest man alive by winning MV's first 500 cc Grand Prix, on the hallowed asphalt of Monza, beating Gilera's Umberto Masetti by 58 seconds. Giuseppe Commendatore Gilera was so incensed that he lodged a protest, claiming MV's engine was oversize. It wasn't.

In 1952, the Agusta factory started building helicopters under licence to American manufacturer Bell. And aviation once again became fundamental to the Count's business. Although MV Agusta continued to sell small numbers of exotic road bikes, from this moment on racing was a hobby for Count Domenico. Helicopters made him a fortune, which he spent on racing. Aviation technology also served him well on the racetrack. His Grand Prix bikes were constructed using the same high-tech casting, forging and machining techniques used in the manufacture of his helicopters.

At that time MV product line-up consisted of motorcycles and scooters with two-stroke engines, with a capacity from 98 to 150 cc. But people who lived in mountainous areas always preferred four-stroke engines because of their torque. So Remor was tasked to design a four-stroke road model.

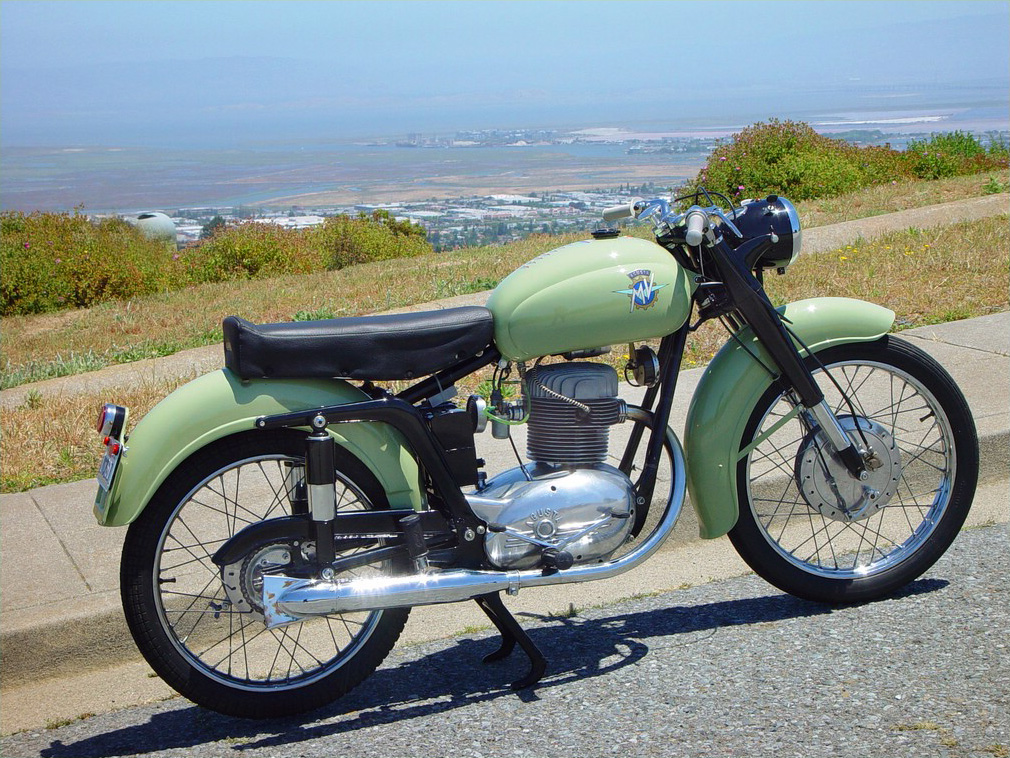
1954 MV Agusta 175 CSTL

At the end of 1952, the MV Agusta 175 was released in two versions: CST and CSTL. It was their first production machine with a four-stroke engine. The unit construction single-cylinder engine was designed with an overhead camshaft for high performance. The chain-driven camshaft operated the valves via rocker arms, which were closed by hairpin valve springs. The engine was inclined forward at 10° and manufactured in alloy and a bore and stroke of 59.5 × 62 mm. This model had a frame of a double loop design using tubes for the front sections and pressed steel members at the rear. The engine was used as a stressed member. Suspension was telescopic forks at the front and a swinging arm at the rear. The 175 CST was equipped with separate saddles and 17" wheels, the CSTL (Turismo Lusso) had 19" wheels and a "long seat" (dualseat) fitted. The 175 CST weighed 103 kg and figured top speed of 100 km/h.

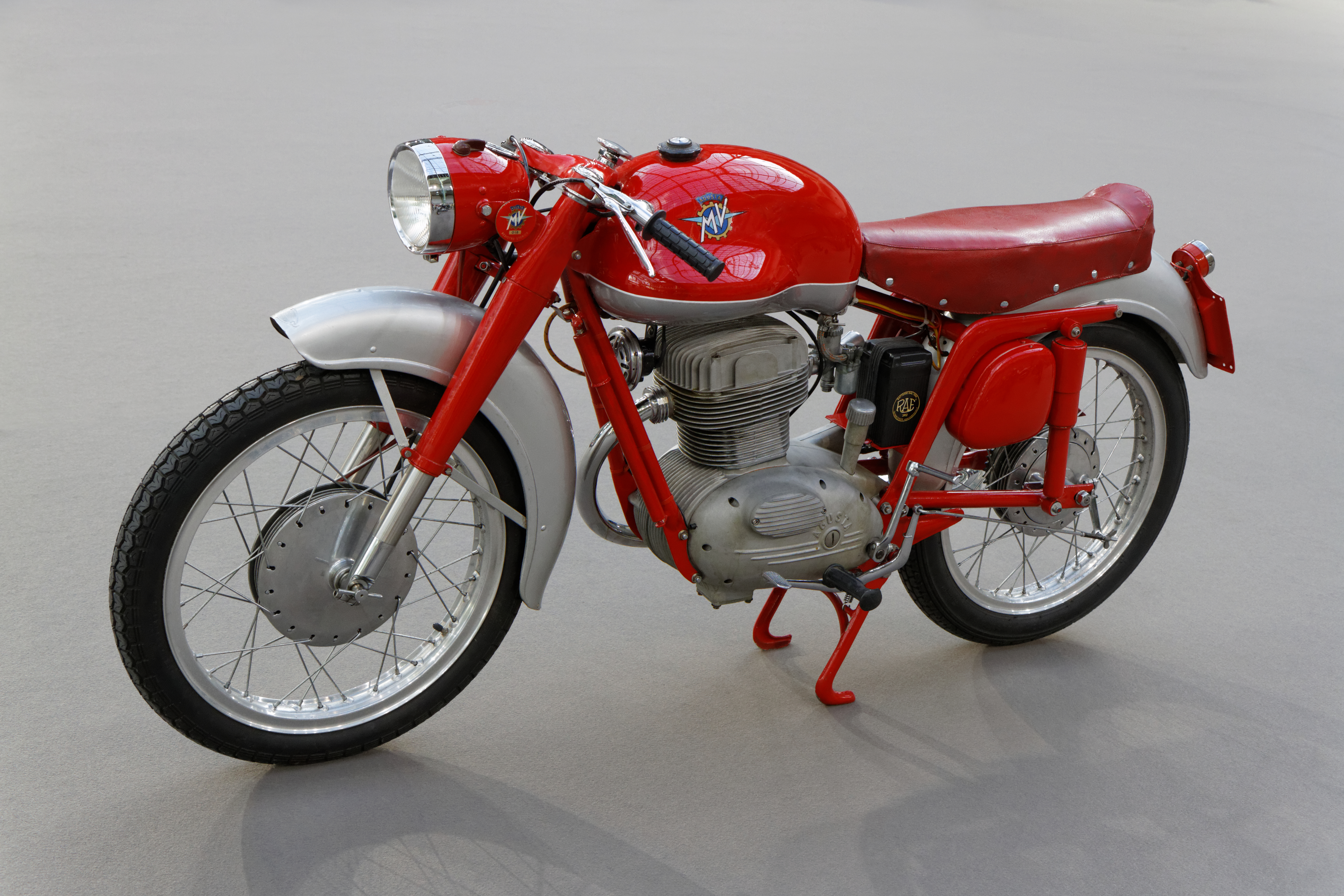
1955 MV Agusta 175 CS

In less than a year MV Agusta introduced a sportier version 175 CS with a larger carburetor (22 mm instead of 18 mm), a higher compression ratio, a larger cylinder head with bigger fins, aluminum wheel rims and plenty of glossy red paint. Its 175 cc one-cylinder engine produced 11 hp at 6700 rpm, giving a 115 km/h top speed. This model featured lower handlebars, a more sporty riding position and a beautifully sculpted fuel tank that quickly earned it the unofficial nickname "Disco Volante" (English: flying saucer) as, viewed from the front, the tank shape was reminiscent of a flying saucer.

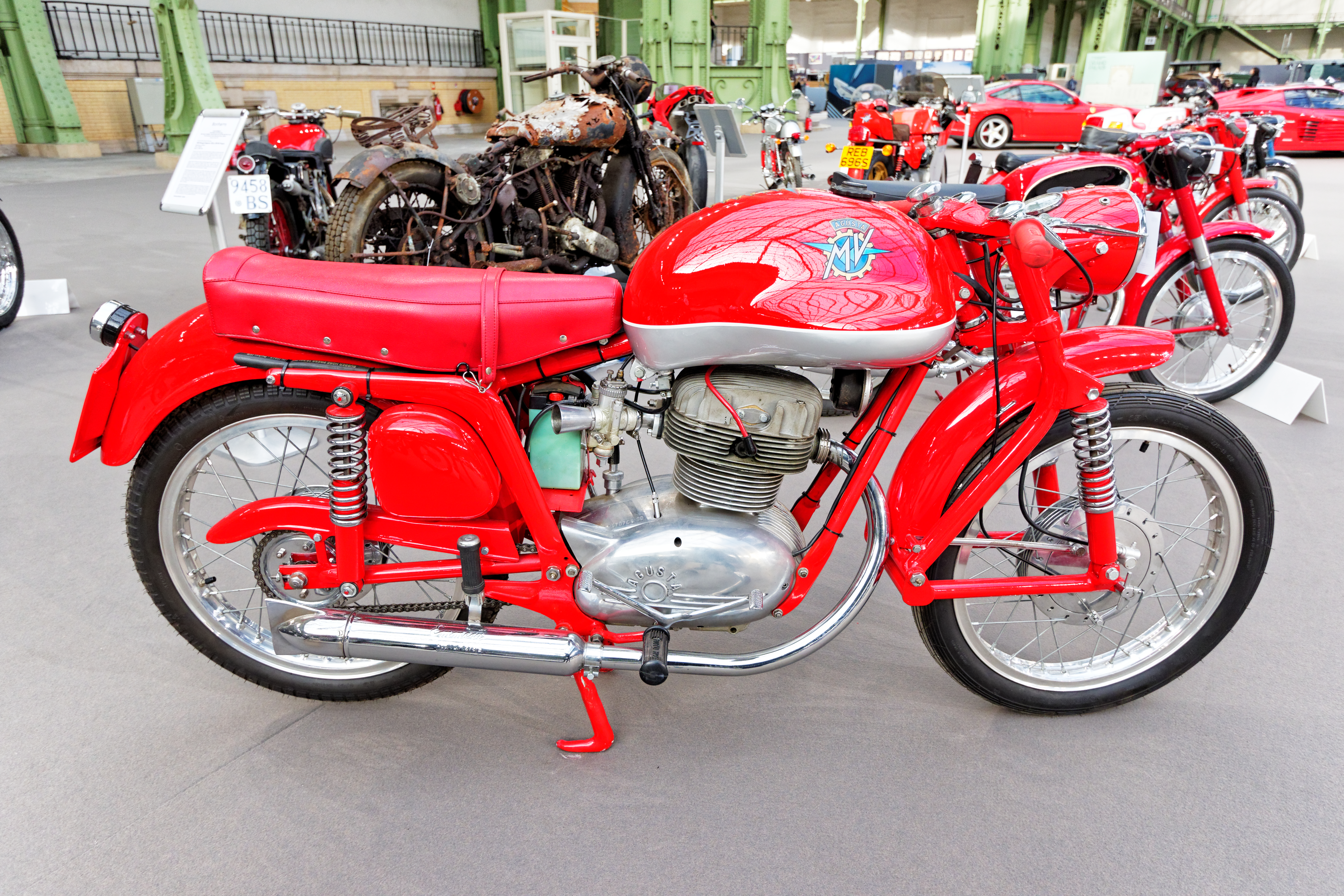
1954 MV Agusta 175 CSS

In July 1954, MV began offering a very limited-availability racing model 175 CSS (Super Sport). The engine was further turned from the CS model, including higher compression ratio and a larger carburetor, to produce 15 hp at 8,800 rpm. Cycle parts were the same as the CS model, except it was fitted with Earles forks.

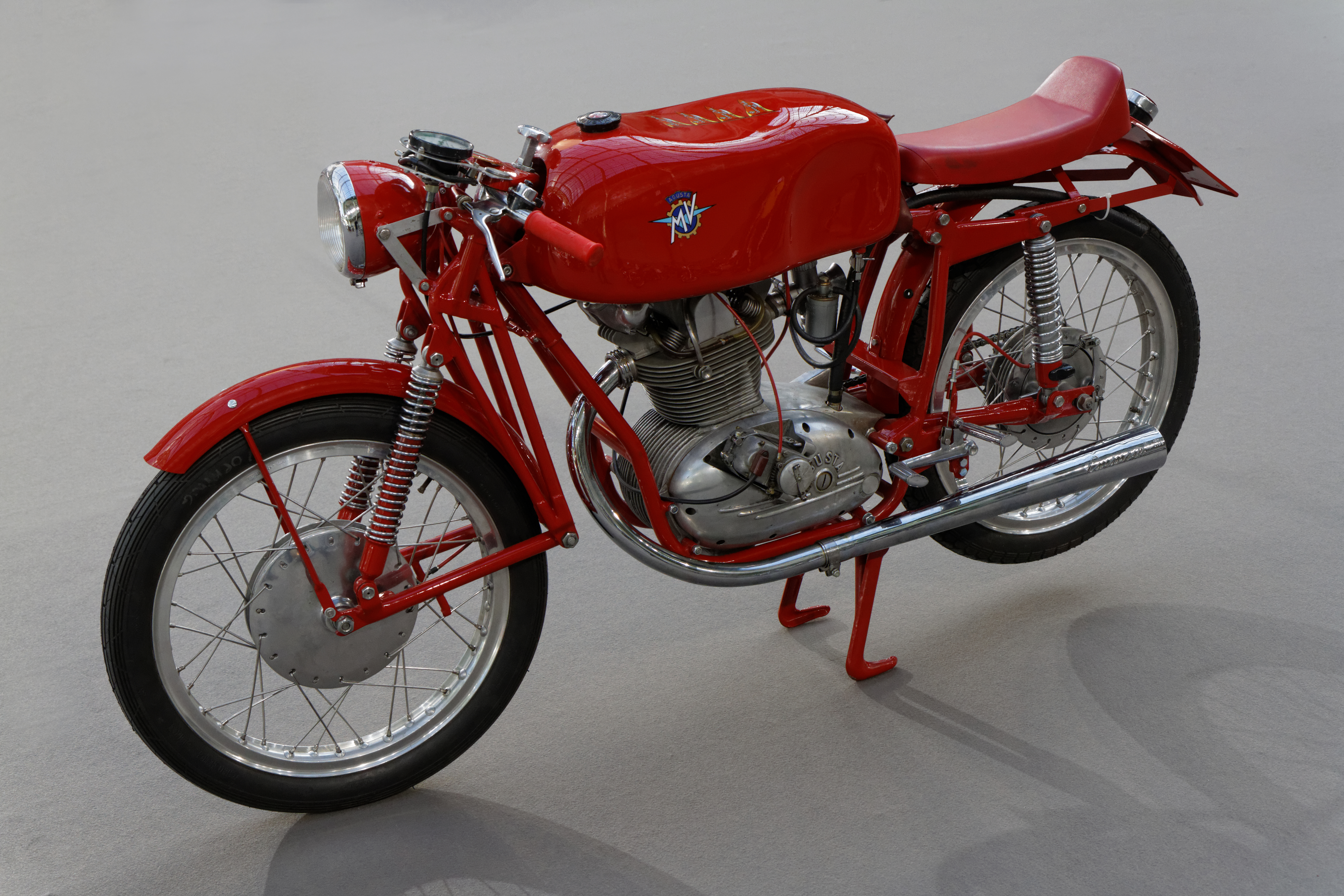
1954 MV Agusta 175 CSS-5V Squalo

In 1955, MV Agusta designed the 175 CSS-5V for the 175 cc Formula Sport Derivata race series. The "Squalo" (English: shark), as it was generally known, had a lighter frame based on that used on the works racers, larger brakes, a magneto, Earles forks and a five-speed gearbox. The bike became the part of motorcycle racing history thanks to the first victory of young Mike Hailwood, the future nine-time world champion. Mike won his first ever race on one of these machines bored out to 196 cc in a 200-cc class race at Oulton Park in 1957. Around 200 of the model were manufactured between 1954 and 1957.

The 175 cc engine became famous not only in road racing. From 1955 to 1958, MV also produced off-road racing motorcycles. But, perhaps, the most unexpected option manufactured in the same years was the trike Motocarro with a load capacity of 300 kg.

Unfortunately the 175 cc family had a considerable drawback. In fact, the flip side of its advantages. After all, the motorcycle was designed by the racing engineer, who spent the best part of his life following the rule brilliantly formulated by Ferdinand Porsche: "The perfect racing car crosses the finish line first and subsequently falls into its component parts". Four-stroke 175-cc MV Agusta engines were distinguished by excellent dynamics at that time, but not durability. They were even given the nickname "Fragile Diamonds". In addition, the upper camshaft complicated the procedure for cleaning carbon deposits, which was required several times a season due to the quality of oil and fuel. Therefore, for the new 125cc motorcycle, which was supposed to replace two-stroke models, a simplified version of the four-stroke engine was developed, with pushrods operating the valves.

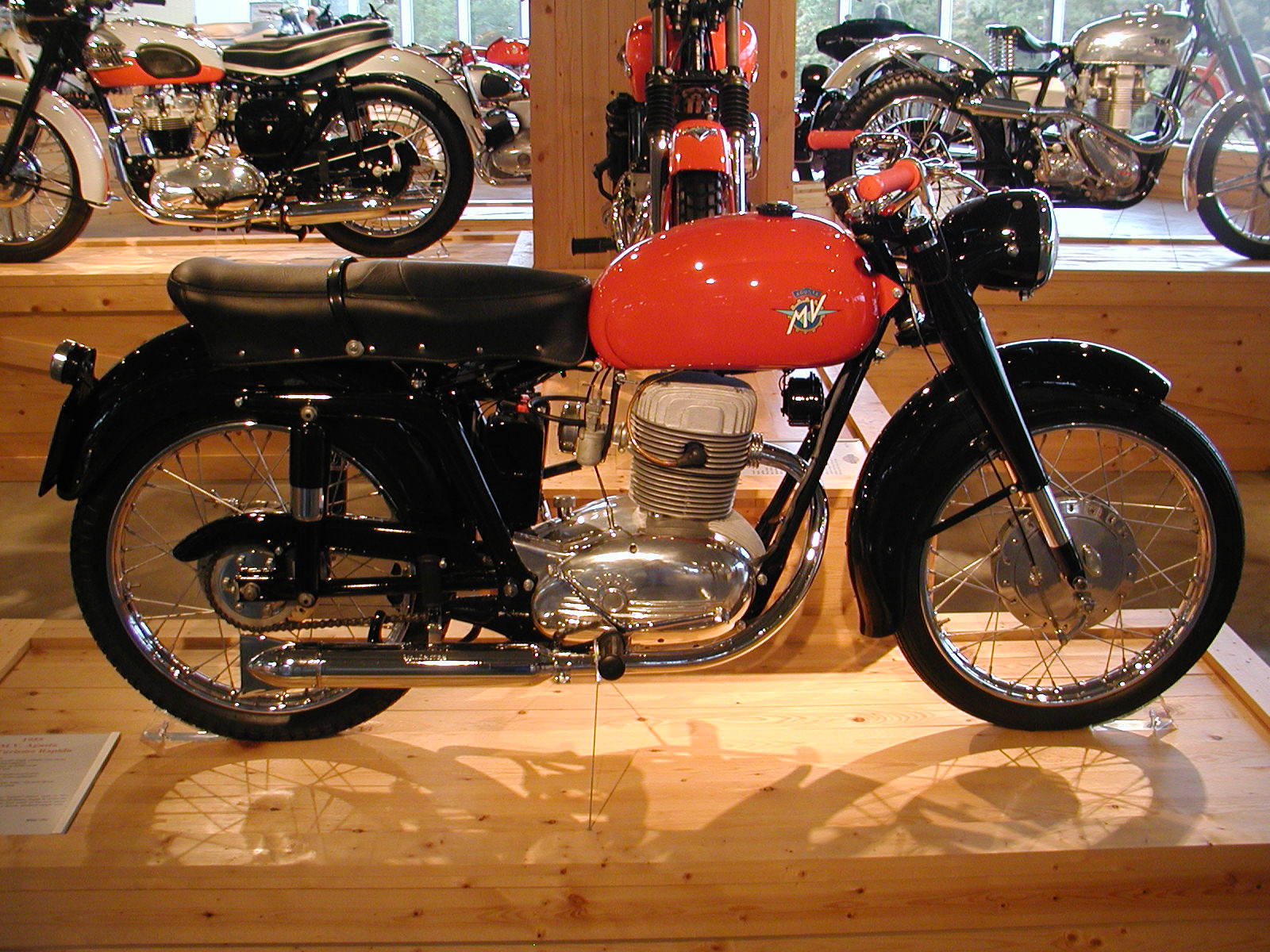
1955 MV Agusta 125 Turismo Rapido

The model debuted in 1954 in two versions: Turismo Rapido (6.5 hp) and Rapido Sport (7.5 hp). The chassis was similar to the 175-cc models (although the first units used a fully tubular frame, it was soon replaced by the same mixed design as the 175 CST), but a radical improvement appeared on the Rapido Sport was a hydraulically damped telescopic fork.

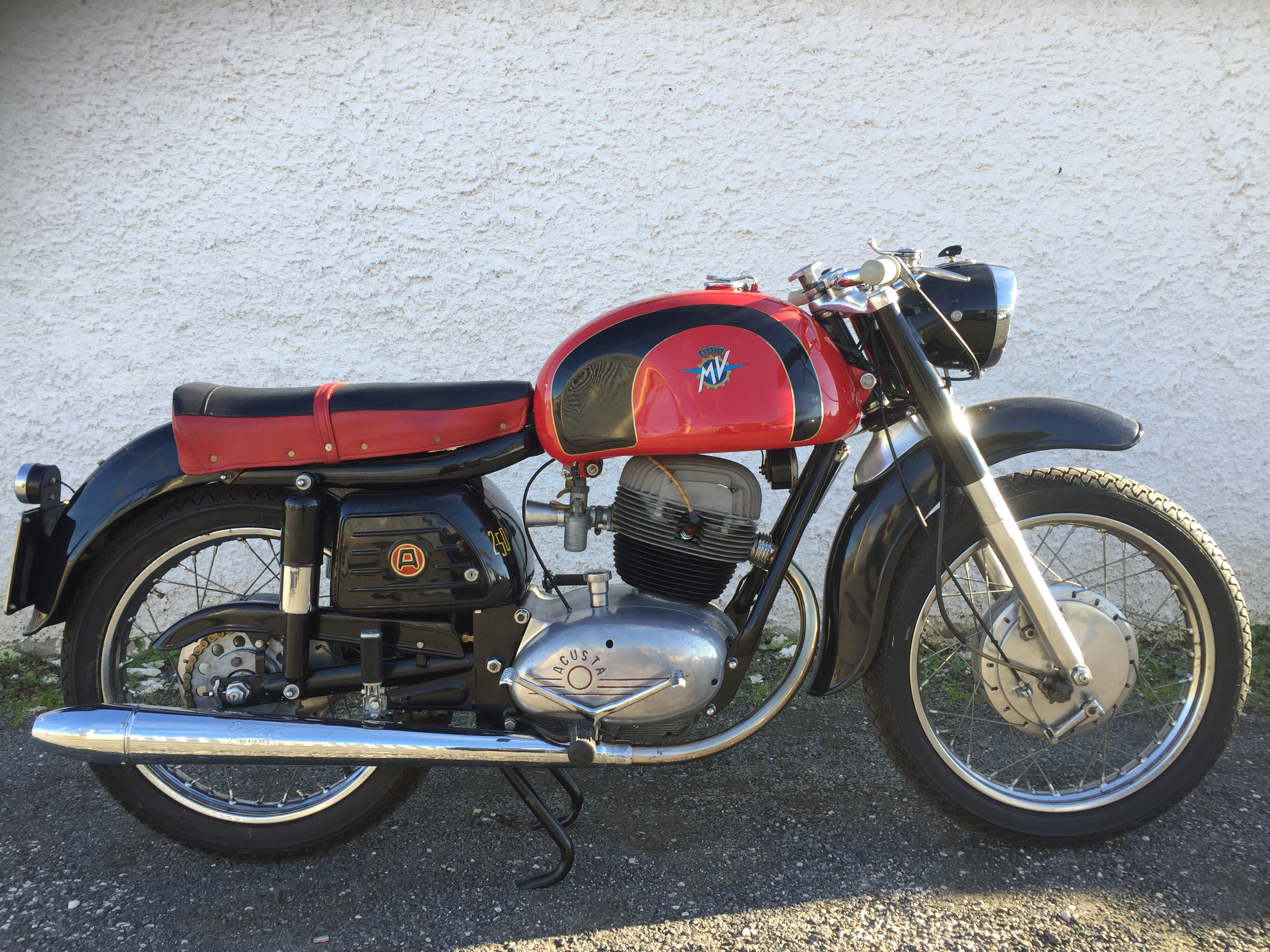
1956 MV Agusta 250 Raid

Now Italian engineers were ready to take the next step: to increase capacity up to 250 cc. In the fall of 1956, the company introduced the 250 Raid. Its name seemed to hint: the toys were over, it was time to go on a long journey – at least across Europe (the name was chosen by voting among dealers of the brand). Technically, the motorcycle became the development of a 125-cc model: a single-cylinder four-stroke overhead valve (OHV) engine, a four-speed gearbox, a duplex frame closed through the crankcase of the power unit. Of course, everything was done much more solidly, so the dry weight of the motorcycle increased from 102 to 160 kg. As a result, 14 hp engine could hardly power this bike to 115 km/h. In addition, the motorcycle looked like a clone of the junior models, with no hints of its high status. All of that generated low demand. In 1959, in an attempt to recover the poor sales of the 250, the company introduced a 16-hp 300-cc version. Army and police purchased a small number of these motorcycles in respective versions, but the overall sales were far from brilliant. As a result, the success hoped for was not realized with only 544 250-cc machines and about 500 300-cc machines being produced.

Trying to completely rid the brand of the dubious fame of "fragile diamonds", the company's engineers completely redesigned the lubrication system by the 1959 season: they installed a high-performance oil pump, a centrifugal oil filter, and increased the volume of the pan. The main new MV Agusta 125 TRE advertising message was focused on its reliability and assured 100,000 km mileage without any problems, for which the model was nicknamed "Centomila" (English: one hundred thousand).

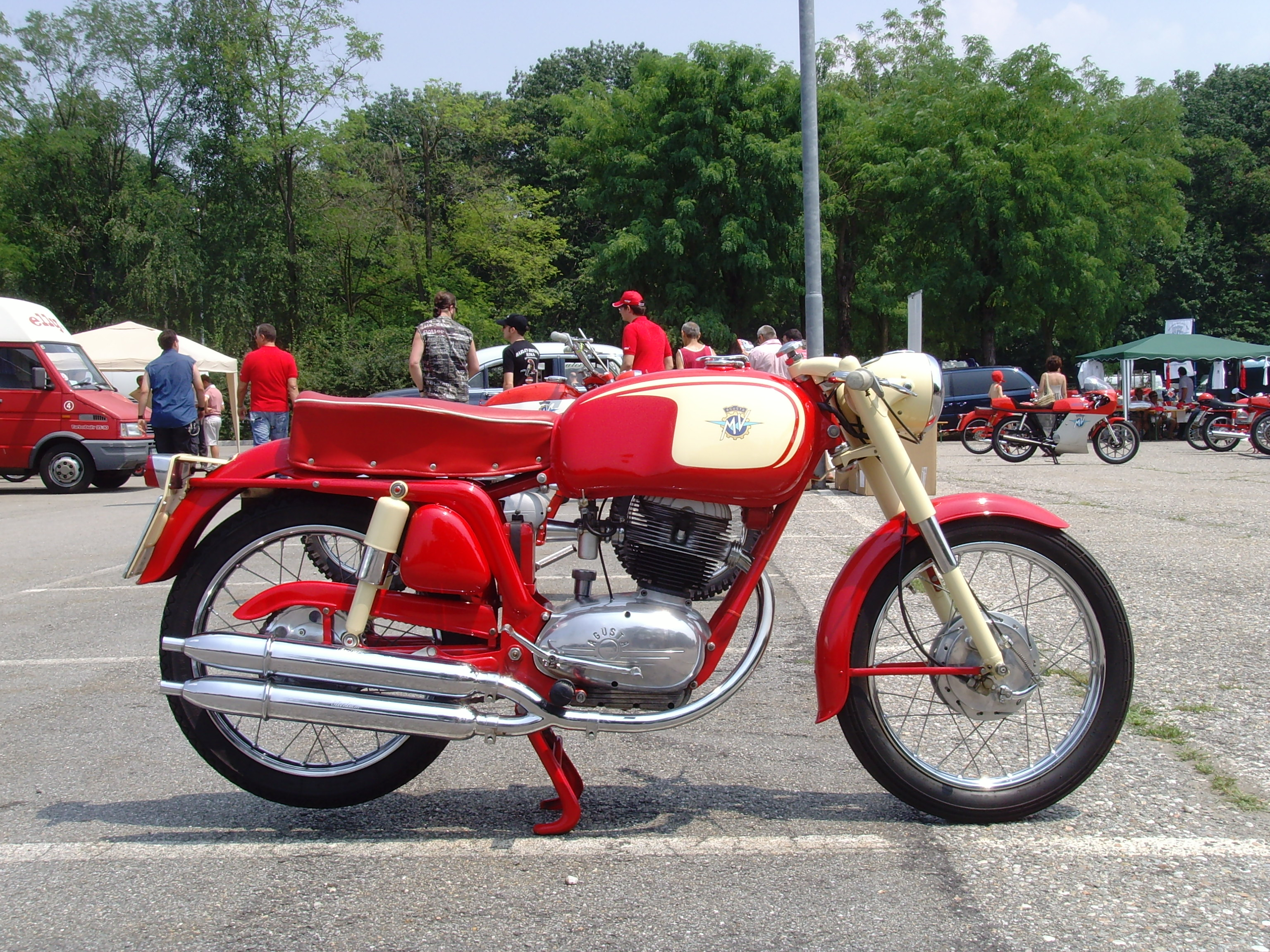
1959 MV Agusta 150 Rapido Sport

In 1958, responding to the new Italian Road Law (Italian: Codice della strada), which closed highways for motorcycles of 125 cc or less, the company released a 150-cc version of the MV Agusta 150 RS (Rapido Sport). Its 10 hp engine accelerating the motorcycle up to 110 km/h, allowed it to stay in the stream (the most popular car of those times – the Fiat 500 – had a lower maximum speed). The same engine, detuned to 7 hp, was also installed on the small three-wheeled scooter Centauro. This machine with a load capacity of 350 kg already had a cab.

In 1957, MV produced a cheaper version of the 175-cc engine with a camshaft located in the engine block. Later in 1959, this engine bored up to 232 cc became a heart of a new motorcycle – Tevere (English: Tiber). In fact, the 11 hp Tevere was a more dynamic and less affordable version of MV Agusta 150 RS, so the model was discontinued soon. But the 232-cc engine itself, equipped with forced cooling, was produced until 1968, to complete the Trasporto Tevere cargo scooter.

A new family of ultralight (only 83 kg for basic version) Checca motorcycles debuted in 1960 to replace the Ottantatrè model. Technically Checca was similar to the 125-cc Centomila, but with a scaled parts. The basic version GT was equipped with an 83-cc 4 hp engine, an upper level GTE version had a 99-cc 5.15-hp engine and the Sport version had a 99-cc 6.5-hp engine. In 1962, the family was supplemented the GTL version with a 125-cc 5.5-hp engine. The family was in production for totally 9 years, however it had no big commercial success.

The 1958 Italian Road Law (Italian: Codice della strada) defined a new category "ciclomotore": a two- or three-wheeled vehicle with engine capacity 50 cc or less and speed 40 km/h or less. Italian motorcycle industry saw in the new law an opportunity to attract younger riders’ audience. MV Agusta from its side presented Liberty family in 1962. In fact, it was the same Checca, but even more lightweight and simplified, with a 47.7-cc 1.5-hp engine at 4,500 rpm. An interesting fact that sales of the Liberty Sport version significantly exceeded the sales of the basic Liberty Turismo.

After the 1957 season, the Italian motorcycle manufacturers Gilera, Moto Guzzi and Mondial jointly agreed to withdraw from Grand Prix competition due to escalating costs and diminishing sales. Count Agusta originally agreed to withdraw, but then had second thoughts. MV Agusta went on to dominate Grand Prix racing, winning 17 consecutive 500-cc world championships. Count Agusta's competitive nature drove him to hire some of the best riders of the time, including Carlo Ubbiali, John Surtees, Mike Hailwood, Giacomo Agostini, Phil Read, and the best engineers, in particular Arturo Magni. The three- and four-cylinder race bikes were known for their excellent road handling. The fire-engine red racing machines became a hallmark of Grand Prix racing in the 1960s and early 1970s.

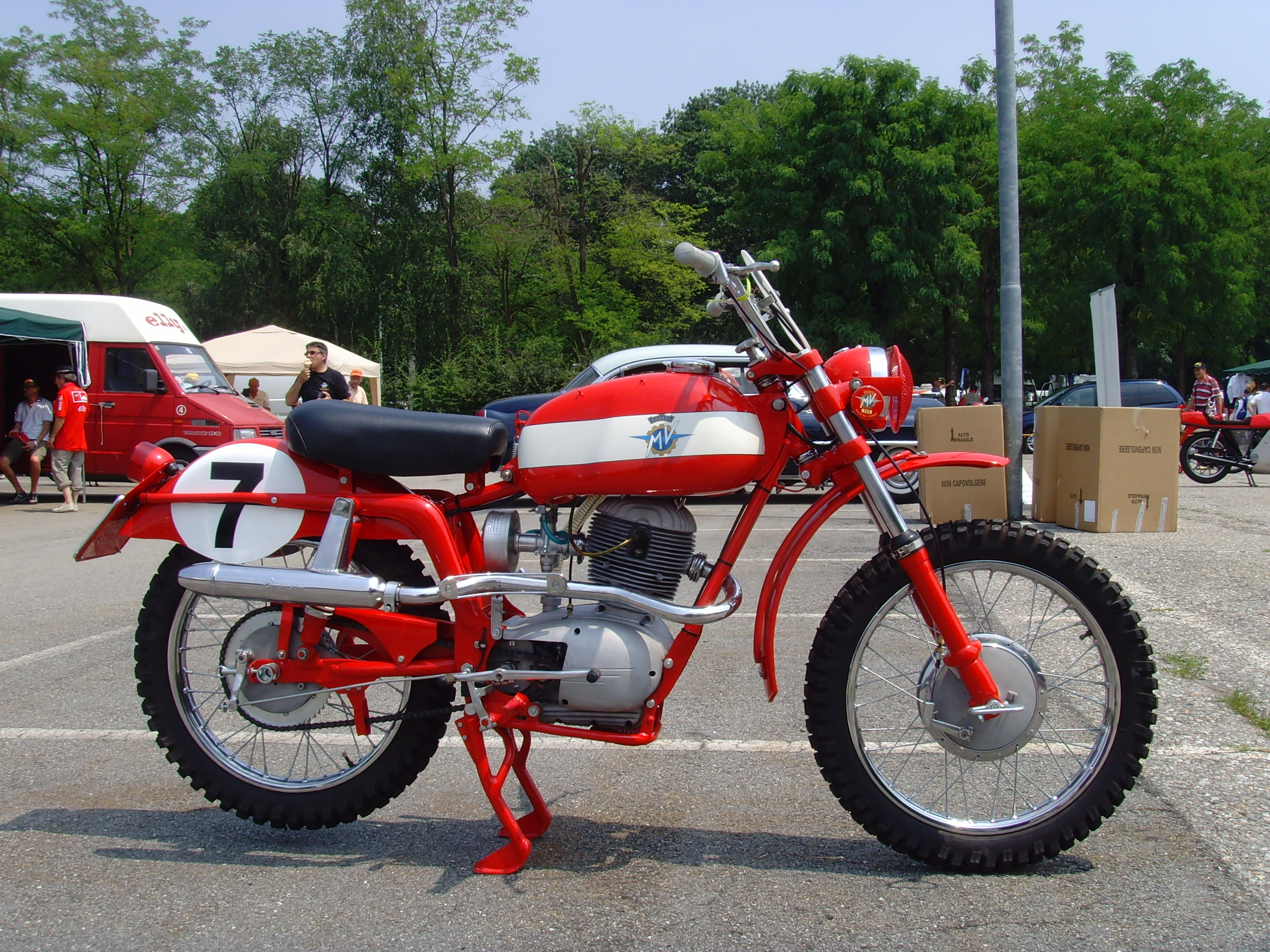
1965 MV Agusta 125 Regolarità

In the early 1960s, MV Agusta decided to return to offroad sport (at the end of the 1950s, MV racers were successful in enduro races, including in the famous Six Days race). A new 125 Regolarita was created by order of Fiamme Oro team. The model was equipped with a 125-cc engine boosted up to 12.5 hp and a five-speed gearbox. Traditionally light MV frame was reinforced with a lower subframe, becoming closed. 19-inch wheels got offroad tyres. This motorcycle became successful, so tens such motorcycles were also sold amateur racers. Moreover, a five-speed gearbox has become standard for 125-cc and 150-cc road motorcycles since 1966, the factory line-up was supplemented by the Scrambler version.

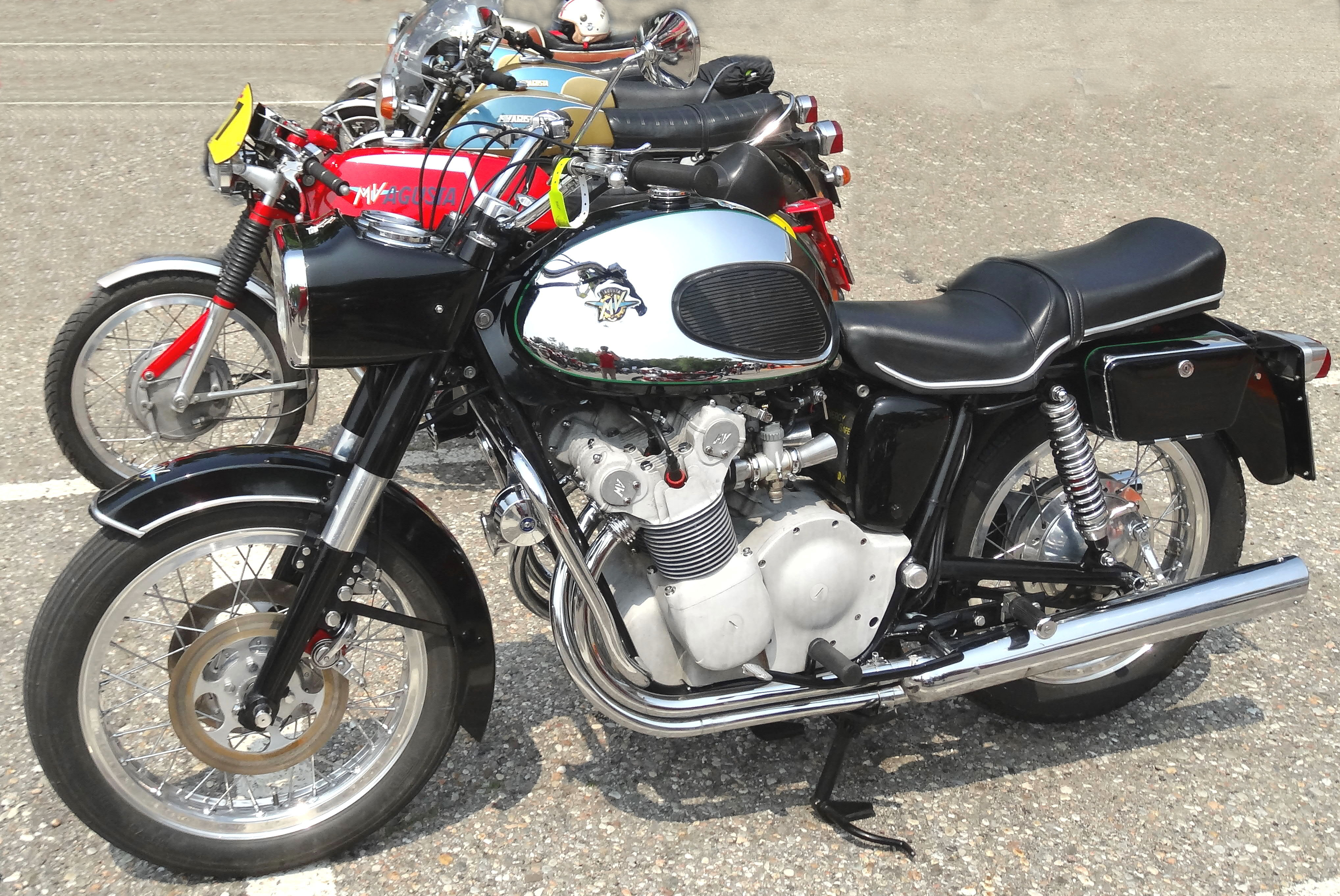
1966 MV Agusta 600 Turismo

The main MV premiere at the 1965 EICMA Milan Motorcycle Show was the flagship model 600 with an inline-four 590-cc engine. Such significant novelty put the all new two-cylinder line-up on the background. Most probably it happened also because of the new two-cylinder motorcycles had a regular look, very similar to the previous motorcycles.

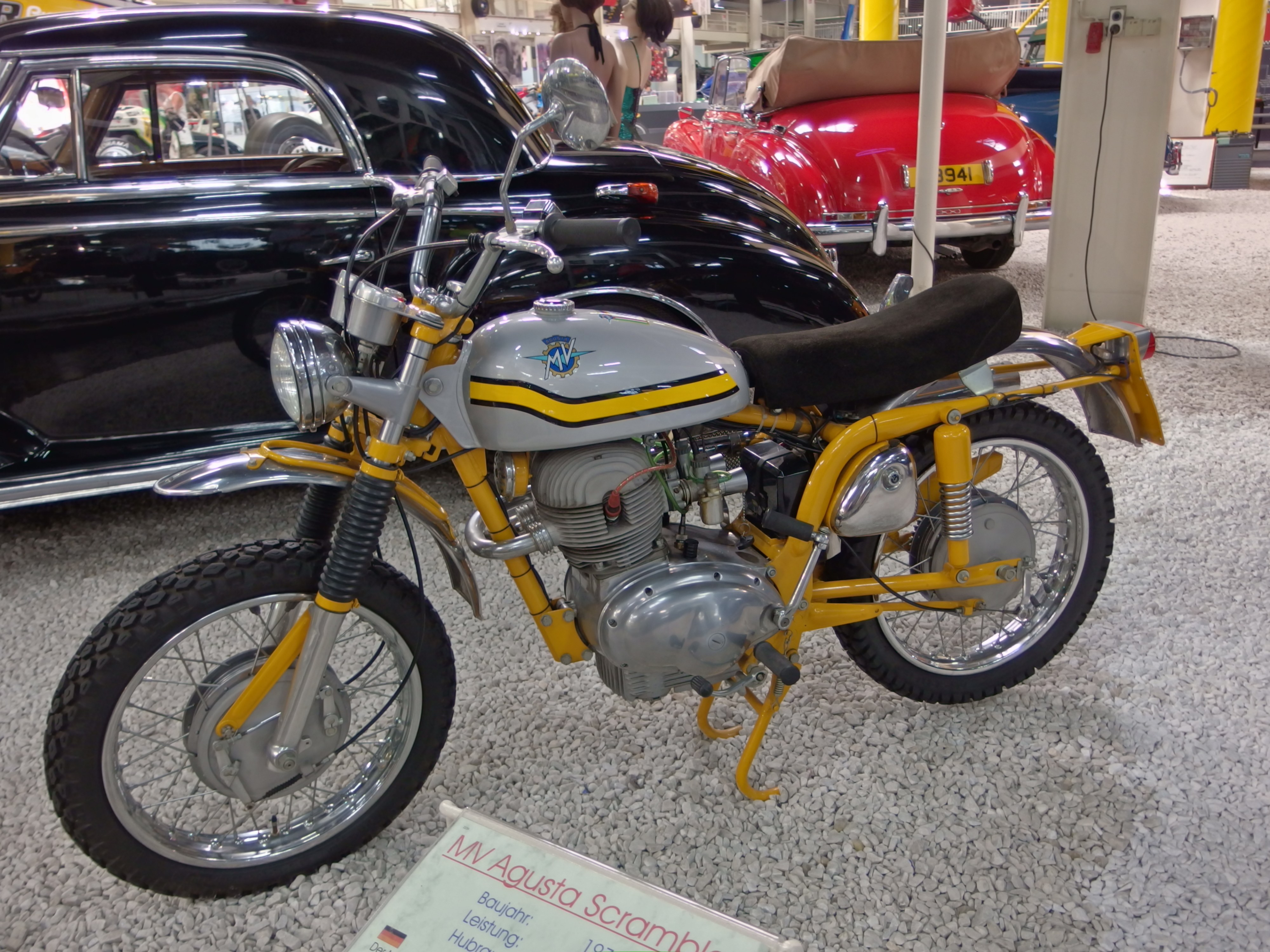
1973 MV Agusta 350 Scrambler

The MV Agusta 250 B (Bicilindrica) had a 247 cc (53 × 56 mm) four-stroke parallel twin engine, a battery ignition system, two carburetors and a five-speed gearbox. Its 19 hp were enough to achieve 135 km/h. But the price was too high, and the characteristics were not the most impressive, which is why by the end of 1970 the total number of released three versions barely reached 1,452 units, and the model gave way to another generation, a much more successful MV Agusta 350 B with engine bored out to 349 cc.

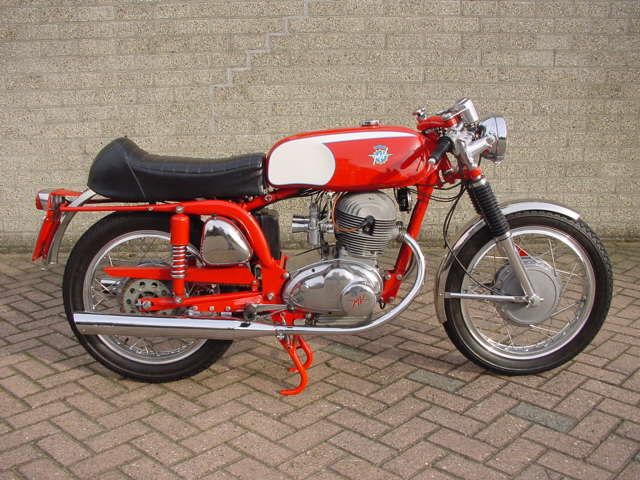
1971 MV Agusta 350 (2C) Supersport

Motorcycles MV Agusta became more advanced, with modern electrical equipment and improved suspensions. At the same time MV Agusta kept the look of its motorcycles almost unchanged. Meanwhile, the 1960s became a turning point in motorcycle design world, and other Italian companies set new design excellence standards not supported by MV Agusta with its motorcycles' look "from the 1950s". The first significant design improvement became only in 1970, however it was not well accepted by customers and the second change became in 1971. The changes included elongated gas tanks, front forks without covers, low handlebars, saddles with a "hump".

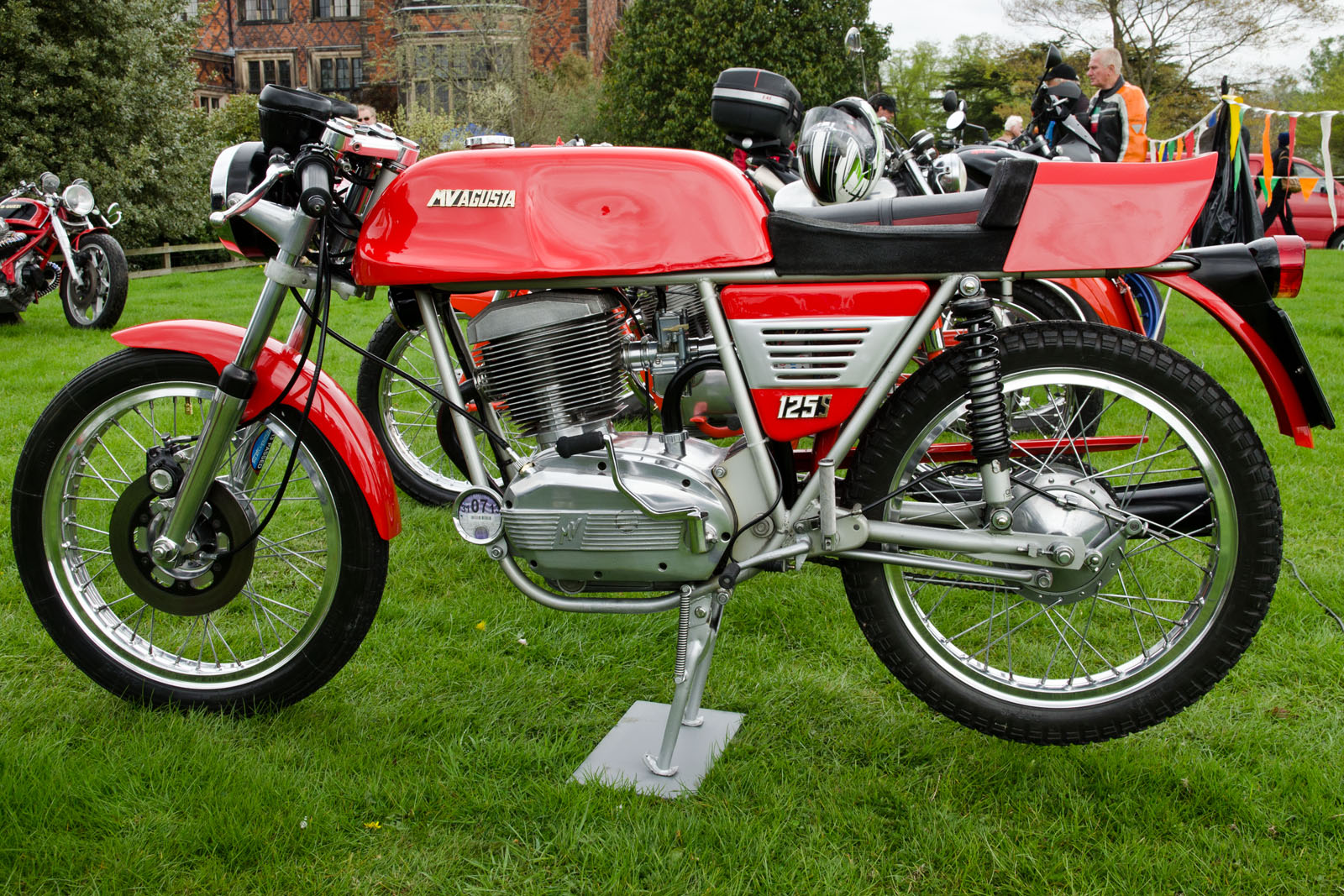
1975 MV Agusta 125 Sport SE

The new MV Agusta 125 Sport entered the market in 1974. Now, the design was one step ahead! The straightened lines that were just coming into fashion reflected the trend set a year earlier by the prototype MV Agusta 350 Ipotesi. Even the fins and the crankcase got square-shape. Some of the motorcycles were equipped with a Grand Prix type fairing. Technical advantages included fully enclosed, fully tubular duplex frame, front disc brake and electronic ignition system.

Alas, it was the last development of one- and two-cylinder motorcycles. The heirs of Domenico Agusta did not have passion to the motorcycle business and it declined soon. The last MV motorcycle manufactured in the company's old factory was 125 Sport in 1977.

==== Spanish production ====
Count Agusta had plans to expand the MV Agusta brand internationally. In post-Civil War Spain, the Franco regime banned the import of motorcycles and also forbade foreign nationals from settling in Spain, or starting a business there. Brothers Mario and Natale Corando and financiers Enrique Favier and Antonio Sommariva wanted to set up manufacture of MV machines under licence by a local factory, which had licenses and manufacturing permits and therefore had access to raw materials. A deal was struck with Nilo Masó of Alpha in Barcelona and MV Alpha was formed in 1948.

Sales were good, but because of the limited facilities of Alpha, production could not be increased. The licence to produce MV motorcycles was transferred to the larger and better equipped Avello factory in the Natahoyo neighbourhood of Gijón in Asturias in 1951, creating the MV Avello brand. Production in Spain continued until 1972.

==== 1967–1974: World's first production transverse 4-cylinder motorcycles ====
Inline 4-cylinder engines have been a modern characteristic feature of MV Agusta. For the first time this type of engine designed by Pierro Remor was used in the 1950 Grand Prix season. In the mid-1960s, when the demand for large engine capacity motorcycles grew, there was born an idea to apply it on a road bike (the first prototype MV Agusta 500 Grand Turismo R19 was built in 1951). It was rumored that preventing any competition Count Agusta ordered to build the road vehicle with no possibility of converting it into a racing one. Therefore, the MV Agusta 600 debuted at the Milan Trade Fair in 1965 was deliberately distinguished by the massive parts of the 592-cc engine, final shaft drive and weighed 221 kg. It became the world's first production motorcycle with a four-cylinder transverse engine. Four-cylinder motorcycles such as the FN Four had been in production since 1905, but they all had longitudinal engines.

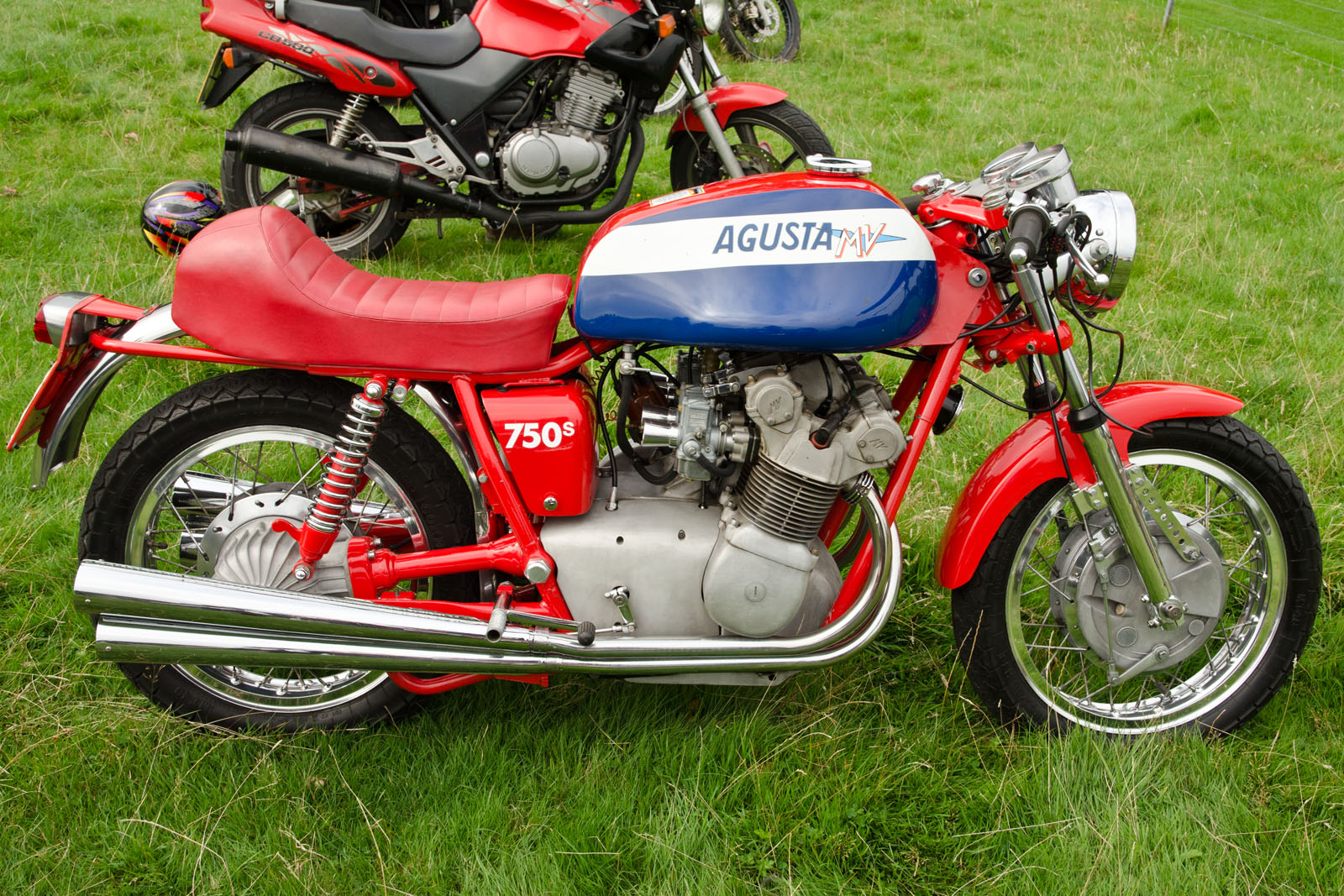
1970 MV Agusta 750S

It was followed by models with engines with a displacement of 743, 790, 837 and 862 cm^{3}, including the legendary 750 Sport and 750 Sport America. Even when the company canceled motorcycle production in 1977, Arturo Magni was authorized to produce and sell motorcycles under the MV Agusta brand on its own. The most advanced model, the 1978 Grand Prix 1100, developed 119 hp, weighed only 202 kg and accelerated from 0–100 km/h in 3.9 sec.

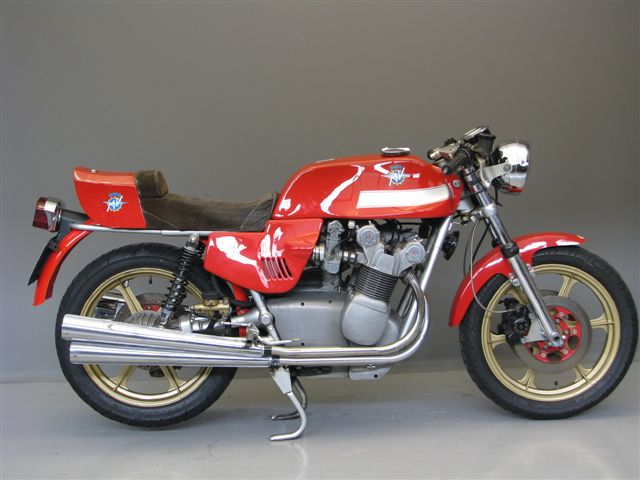
1977 MV Agusta 750 S America

The history of the 750 S America model began when Chris Garville and Jim Cotherman of Commerce Overseas Corporation, the US MV importers, got the idea that with a few modifications, the MV 750 S had great potential in the United States. In the autumn of 1974, they travelled to Italy to discuss these upgrades which were rather well received by Cascina Costa. Result-oriented, the two American businessmen called for an improved design and performance ("style and speed") and announced that they could sell hundreds of this new machine.

In terms of style, the 750 Sport America features a sporty look reminiscent of a "Luxury Café Racer". It was equipped with a 19-litre fuel tank, a small racing mudguard, a single-seater covered in black alcantara fabric and four exhausts. In terms of performance, the engine's displacement was increased to 790 cc and is now powered by four 26 mm Dell'Orto concentric-shaft carburettors (smaller than those of the 750 S, they have the added advantage of remaining stable on bumpy roads). The buyer could either choose four chrome-plated megaphones or else, exhausts with a matt black finish producing a more acceptable noise level.

With a compression ratio of 9.5:1, the four-cylinder produced 75 hp and could take the 750 America to nearly 210 km/h at 8,500 rpm. The America was equipped with a 38 mm Ceriani front fork and a double disc at the front similar to that of the last 750 S.

However, the dealers' hopes did not materialize: there were few customers ready to pay $6,500 for 750 Sport America (for comparison, the Honda CB750 cost $2,190) and only 540 units were produced.

==== 1973–1977: Revolutionary 350 cc ====
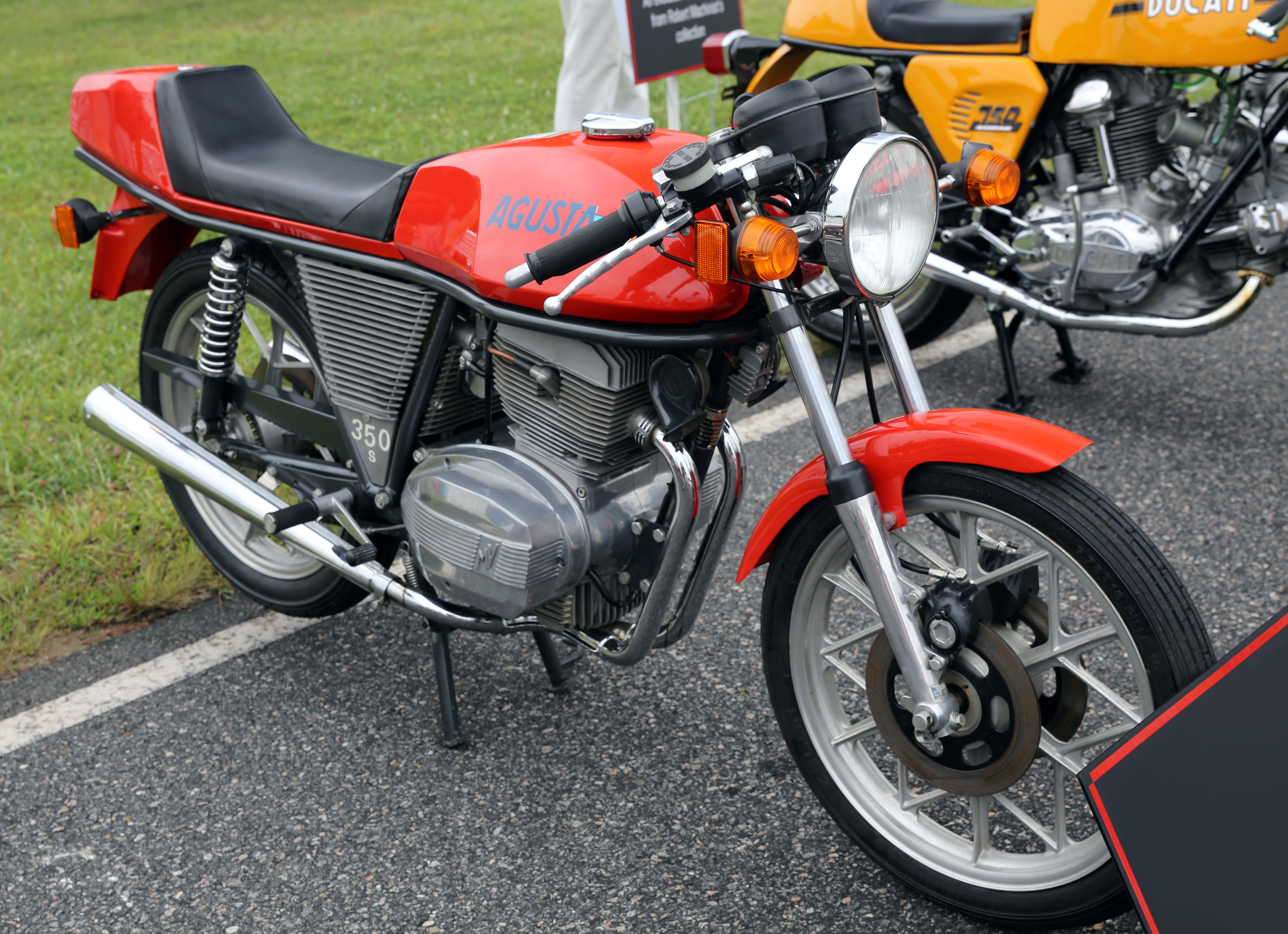
1975 MV Agusta 350 S

MV Agusta 350 S Ipotesi was an example of a car designer's experience in a motorcycle world. It was in production for only two years, and 1,991 units were made. But this happened most probably due to the change of business focuses of the company after Count Domenico Agusta's death. Anyway the design of the MV Agusta 350 S has become decisive in the industry for the next 15 years. While almost all motorcycle designers were focused on round shapes, MV Agusta presented at 1973 Milan Motorcycle Show a prototype 350 Ipotesi that was characterised by horizontal lines and sharp angles. It was designed by Giorgetto Giugiaro, founder of Italdesign. The bike used cast alloy wheels and triple disc brakes which were a significant innovation for that time.

Two years later this model named 350 S went into production. It kept even the squared external cases of the engine, despite the fact that the basic motor internals were identical to the previous 350 twin model. Output was increased from 27 hp at 7800 rpm to 34 hp at 8500 rpm claimed.

==== 1946–1977: Experiments, concepts and non-standard vehicles ====
MV Agusta is famous by its experiments and expands of the range. In 1949, the company launched production of scooters. From 1955 till 1969, MV produced mopeds. In 1975, the company presented the Mini Moto 4 V that looked like MV racing bikes (including even four exhausts and "Grand Prix" front fairing) but it had a 50-cc engine with 1.5 hp only.

The two seater car Vetturetta 350 (English: microcar), presented in 1953, was designed by Pierro Remor to demonstrate the potential of the young company. Of course it has never been brought to market. Now it's part of a motoring exhibition at the MV Agusta Museum.

But MV Agusta also produced lightweight commercial vehicles that were actively sold and used.

The first production three-wheeled delivery truck (Italian: motocarro) appeared in 1947 and had the same 98-cc single-cylinder two-stroke engine as that used in MV 98. It was an odd-looking vehicle with a wooden front-loading bed and a steering wheel. In 1948, several commercial MVs came with a 125-cc two-stroke single-cylinder engine with a three-speed gearbox. In 1949, this engine was replaced with the new four-speed 125 cc.

The second edition of the MV Agusta's commercial three-wheeler – the 175 Motocarro – was presented in 1954. There were several advancements compared to the 98. The steering wheel was replaced by a handlebar. The engine was a 172.3-cc four-stroke derived from the 175 CST (1954) with a single overhead cam. The load bay was at the rear and was made of metal. The wheels were much larger in diameter (17") and the load capacity was of 350 kg.

In 1958, the company unveiled the 150 Centauro RF model. It was the third ‘transport’ vehicle from MV Agusta, and the first with a cab. The 150 cc four-stroke engine was based on the 125 cc unit found in the Turismo Rapido (1954), though this also got a cooling fan. All that yielded 7 hp through a four-speed (plus reverse) gearbox, good for a top speed of about 60 km/h. In 1961, the 150 Centauro RF was replaced by the modernized 150 Centauro RBF with an engine that was derived from the 150 Centomila.

There was the "big brother" of the Centauro which was called the Trasporto Tevere (TT) with the load capacity increased from 350 to 520 kg. The engine was a 235 cc four-stroke with 10 hp and a forced cooling. Further versions were the "MV TTB" (1961) and the "MV TTC" (1965).

However, the real car appeared in the MV Agusta's range in 1956. The 1100 / D2 model was powered by a 1,079 cc twin-cylinder diesel with a four-speed gearbox. Producing 27 hp, it was able to carry a ton. It was offered as a pick-up truck, a delivery van and a pure chassis. The latest modification was the 1101 / D2L with a load capacity of 1200 kg.

MV Agusta also created a single-passenger hovercraft with a 300 cc two-stroke twin (1959), a compact tractor 185 Trattore (1962) and a tracked articulated, all-terrain carrier created by request of the Italian Ministry of Defense (1969).

==== 1971–1980: Loss of the guiding force ====
With the death of Count Domenico Agusta in 1971, the company lost its guiding force. The company won their last Grand Prix in 1976 and by the end of the season they were out of racing. The company's precarious economic position forced MV Agusta to seek out a new financial partner. A solution was found in the form of public financing giant EFIM (Ente Partecipazioni e Finanziamento Industria Manifatturiera), which demanded that MV Agusta exit the motorcycle industry if were to have any chance of straightening its finances. However, they continued to sell bikes until 1980, when the last machine in the Cascina Costa warehouses was bought up.

=== 1991–2004: The revival. Age of Cagiva ===
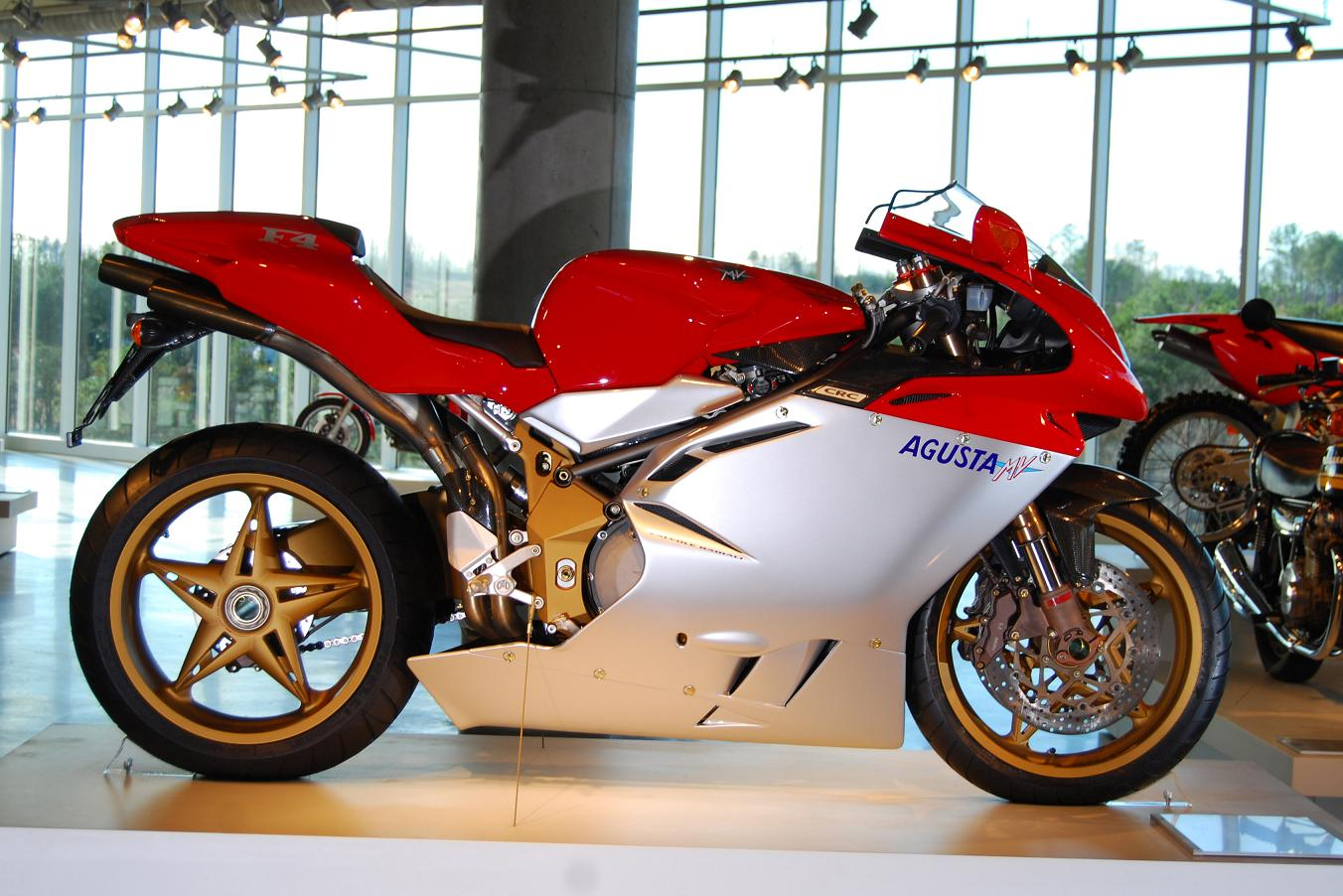
F4 750 Serie Oro

The MV Agusta brand survived thanks to Castiglioni family. In 1960 Italian industrial entrepreneur Giovanni Castiglioni founded a metal fittings plant to produce buttons and rivets for jeans, locks and loops for suitcases, and similar fittings. This business was successful and soon two of Giovanni's sons – Gianfranco and Claudio – joined the company. They both had a passion for motorcycles, probably caused by the proximity of Aermacchi (the European subsidiary of AMF-Harley-Davidson since 1960) factory in Varese. At the end of 1976, when MV announced its withdrawal from motorcycle racing, Castiglioni brothers tried to buy the MV racing team, but Corrado Agusta did not approve the deal. Then Castiglioni bought a Suzuki RG500, painted it in traditional MV Agusta colours – red and silver – and provided it to the racers Gianfranco Bonera and Marco Lucchinelli in the 1978 racing season. In the same year, they bought the Aermacchi factory in Varese and renaming it Cagiva (CAstiglioni + GIovanni + VArese). Brothers were focused on more on racing rather than on serial production and they launched the new project Cagiva GP500 led by Ezio Mascheroni, former head of the AMF-Harley-Davidson racing division.

Soon Cagiva became the largest Italian motorcycle manufacturer with annual production of 40,000 units. Things move slowly in Italy and, in the spring of 1992, the Castiglioni family finally managed to acquire MV Agusta. At the time, the Castiglionis owned Cagiva, Ducati, Moto Morini and Husqvarna, and operated out of the old Harley-Davidson Aermacchi premises at Schiranna on the shores of Lake Varese.

Massimo Tamburini ran Cagiva's design department, CRC (that time this abbreviation stood for "Cagiva Research Centre"), in San Marino. Tamburini came to Cagiva from Bimota (the ‘Ta’ in Bimota), and by late 1992 was in the final stages of finishing the Ducati 916. But after the 916 was finished, Tamburini was ill with a stomach tumour and it wasn't until 1995 that he could embark on the next production bike project: the four-cylinder F4.

The first prototype was completed on the eve of the 1997 Trade Fair in Milan and exhibited to the press for the first time on September 16 of that year. But this presentation became a big surprise because this bike bore the MV Agusta logo.

The genesis for a new four-cylinder motorcycle went back to September, 1989, when Claudio Castiglioni and Tamburini discussed creating a high-performance 750cc four-cylinder all-Italian motorcycle.

As CRC was heavily involved in Cagiva's 500cc Grand Prix racing program, resources to develop the F4 were limited so Ferrari Engineering in Modena was engaged to develop the prototype. The four-cylinder engine was initially similar to half a Ferrari V8. The choice of radial valves was also Ferrari Formula 1-inspired.

Engine development was problematic and in 1991 the F4 project was moved to the Ducati factory at Borgo Panigale in Bologna. Here two of Ducati's most eminent engineers, Massimo Bordi and Fabio Taglioni were engaged to help facilitate development.

By 1994, the Cagiva Group was under considerable financial pressure and, at the end of the year, the Cagiva Racing Department closed. Department head Riccardo Rosa then assumed control of the F4 project, which moved back to Schrianna. Andrea Goggi, an engineer with Cagiva since 1988, was entrusted with redesigning the engine.

Massimo Tamburini was given the task of finalising the chassis and styling. By now it was decided the F4 would be an MV Agusta and Tamburini was given a blank sheet of paper with the freedom to design what he wanted. When Cagiva sold Ducati to the Texas Pacific Group in 1996, Tamburini elected to stay with Cagiva, citing as his reason, "Cagiva is my family".

The F4 was equipped with an inline four cylinder 749.5 cc engine with radial valves. It produced 126 hp at 12,500 rpm and 72 Nm at 10,500 rpm. The maximum speed was 275 km/h. But probably the most unique feature was the design: the F4 was even exhibited in the Guggenheim Museum in New York during the Art of the Motorcycle exhibition from June 26 to September 20, 1998. The exhibit list included 95 of the most outstanding motorcycles of all ages. And four of them are MV Agusta brands. The fifties and sixties of the 20th century were represented by two grand prix 500 cc prototypes of the MV Agusta (1956 and 1968 seasons), the first half of the 1970s – by the MV Agusta 750 S (1973), and the late 1990s – the MV Agusta F4 750 (1998). The success of the exhibition was so significant that the museum repeated it twice more: in its branches in Bilbao and Las Vegas.

In 1999, the Cagiva Group was restructured for strategic purposes, with MV Agusta becoming the parent company and main brand identity. Cagiva along with Husqvarna thus became MV Agusta's subsidiaries.

The subsequent process of industrialisation was divided into two distinct stages: the first with production of a limited run of 300 F4 Serie Oro (English: Gold Series) bikes, with carbon fibre bodywork, magnesium parts and an engine with sand cast crankcases anticipating the construction of the S model, destined for a broader range of users thanks to its price, cut by half over that of the previous version.

With just minor improvements the F4 750 was in production until 2004, when it was replaced by the F4 1000. At the same time, in addition to the regular versions of the 750 cc sports bike (S, S 1 + 1, S EVO2 and S EVO3), number of special editions were also produced: 140 hp Senna in 2002 (in memory of the legendary Brazilian racer Ayrton Senna) and 146 hp SPR / SR in 2003 (with improved cylinder head, intake and exhaust). Each special edition was limited by 300 units.

=== 2004–2016: Time of changes ===
By December 2004 due to cashflow problems, Claudio Castiglioni was forced to sell a bigger part of his stake in MV Agusta (65% of the share capital) to Malaysian car maker Proton for 70 million euros. One year later Proton sold its shares to the Italian financial holding GEVI S.p.A. for 1 euro only.

In the meantime, Castiglioni obtained from the North American financier Oliver Curme, a general partner with Battery Ventures, who owned the Norton brand, license for production of a new generation of Norton motorcycles (designed by Tamburini) in Italy. However the deal was not approved by GEVI S.p.A. which proceed with another deal and sold Husqvarna to BMW Motorrad in July 2007.

Being disappointed by these decisions, Castiglioni found a new opportunity for MV Agusta: on July 11, 2008, Harley-Davidson announced they had signed a definitive agreement to acquire the MV Agusta Group for 109 million US dollars (about 70 million euros), completing the acquisition on August 8, 2008. Castiglioni remained its president. Harley-Davidson invested 40 million euros into debts pay-off, production upgrade and the new model launches – a completely new three-cylinder F3 designed by the Ezio Mascheroni (who developed also Cagiva GP500 in the past).

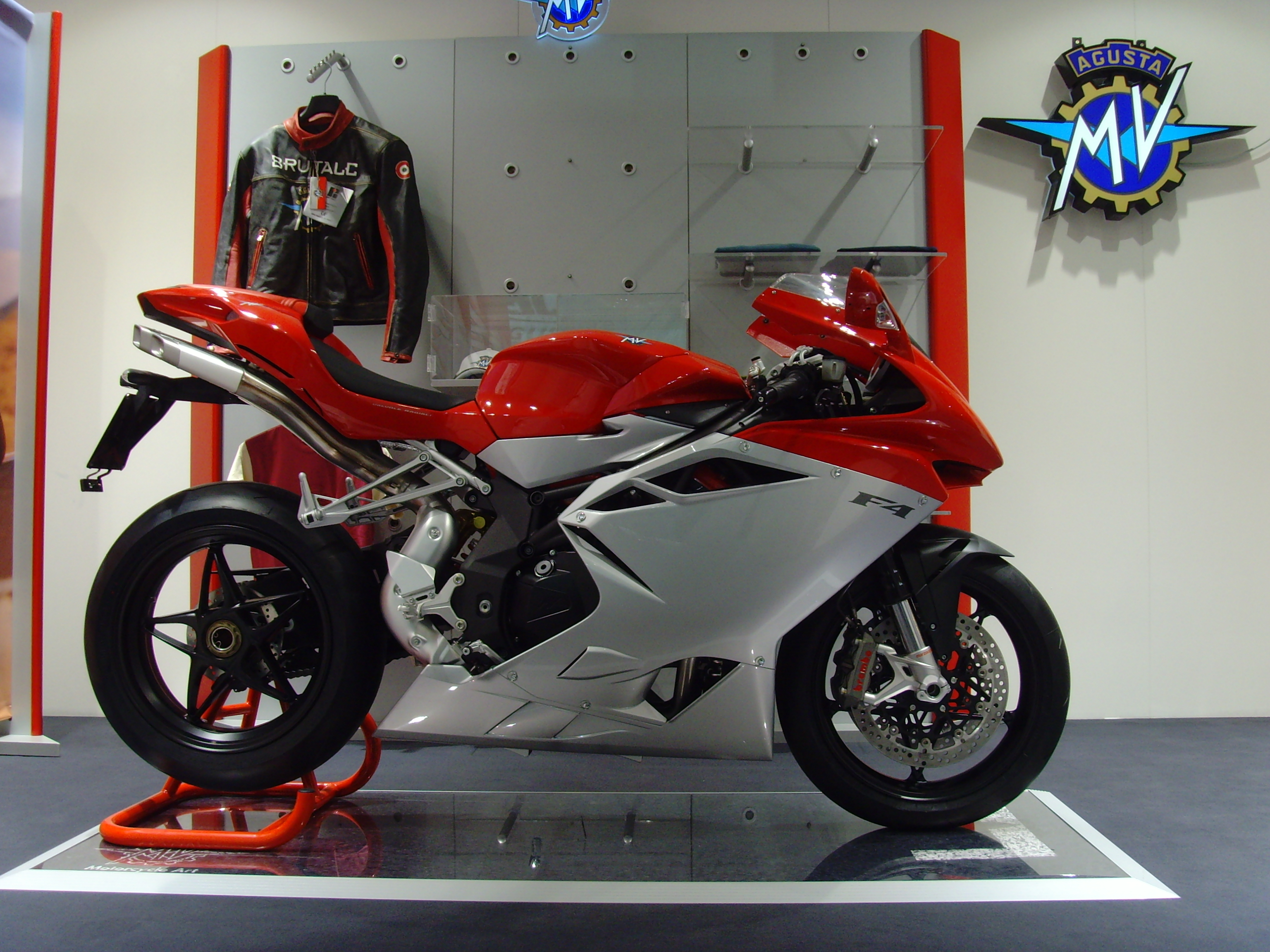
2010 MV Agusta F4 1000

However, due to its own problems Harley-Davidson decided to sell MV Agusta in October 2009. On August 6, 2010, Castiglioni family repurchased the new MV Agusta company, financially healthy and seriously refreshed, for just 1 euro. At EICMA 2010, MV Agusta unveiled the next generation of the extreme F4 sports bike with the new Corsa Corta engine with a capacity of 998 cc and 201 hp. It was the first new four-cylinder engine MV Agusta since 2005. At the same time, the Brutale naked line was updated, getting new model names 990 R (998 cc, 139 hp) and 1090 R (1078 cc, 142 hp). As a result, sales were increased for 50% in Q1 2010 and by the end of the year they achieved 3650 units.

However, on August 17, 2011, after a long illness at the age of 64, Claudio Castiglioni died. Giovanni Castiglioni, the son of Claudio, became the head of the company, and Massimo Bordi, who returned to the motorcycle industry, became vice-president.

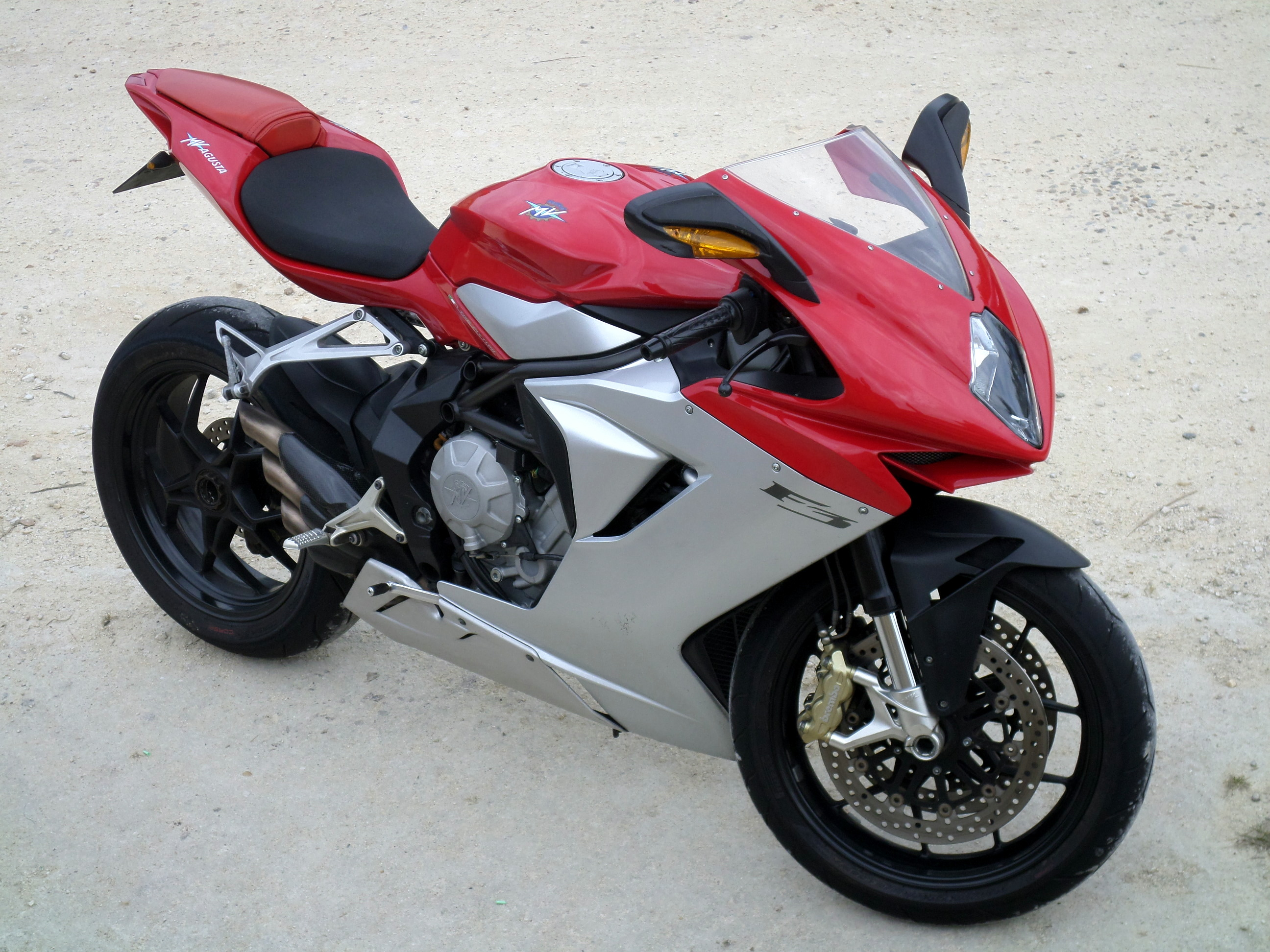
2013 MV Agusta F3 675

"F3 is our future," – Claudio Castiglioni said at the presentation of the three-cylinder F3 model – in fact, he shared the company strategy for the coming years. Production of the "supersport" F3 675 and its naked version Brutale 675 began at the Varese factory in 2012. A year later they were supplemented by 798 cc F3 800 and also by Rivale 800 hypermotard. Then the range of three-cylinder models was expanded with Brutale 800 and the Brutale 800 Dragster, as well as the Turismo Veloce 800 and Stradale 800 sport tourers.

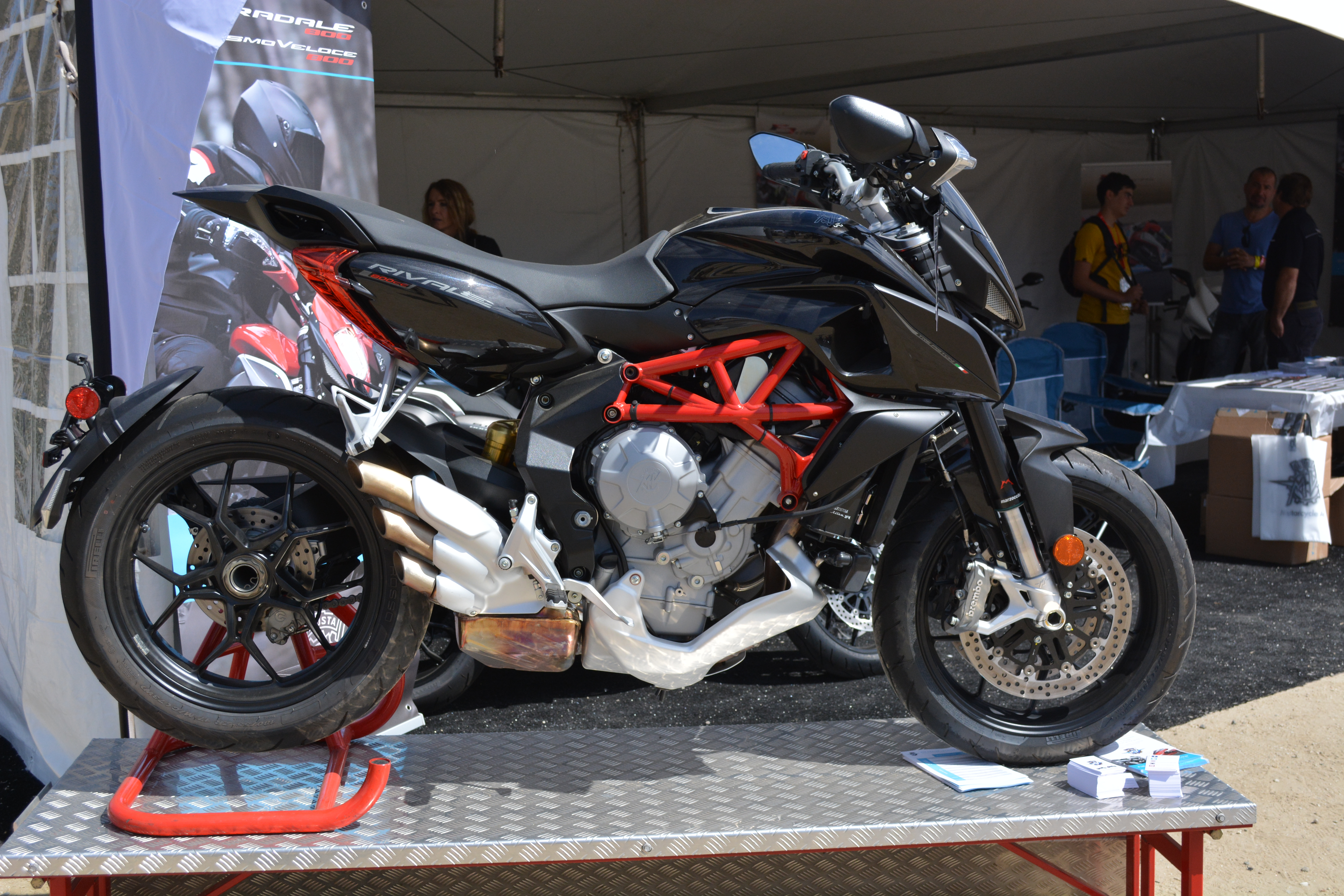
2014 MV Agusta Rivale 800

During the next years, MV Agusta demonstrated significant sales growth: 3,687 units in 2011 (+1% vs prior year), 6557 in 2012 (+70%), 7488 in 2013 (+14%), 9200 in 2014 (+23%). However the company was not able to manage such explosive growth situation from processes and financials side and in the same time MV Agusta increased its debt again. In addition to this MV experienced its traditional problems with dealer network and spare parts delivery. Therefore, the announced partnership with Mercedes-AMG looked like a good deal for MV Agusta .

The motivation of Mercedes-AMG acquisition of 25% of MV (rumored for 30 millions euros of injections into the company plus support in sales & marketing operations) remains unclear. But this followed similar acquisition strategy by rival Ducati, now in partnership with Audi. Anyway this deal helped MV Agusta with getting back lenders' confidence and in February 2015, Banca Popolare di Milano (BPM) with the guarantees of the Italian export credit agency SACE loaned to MV Agusta 15 million euros to implement a new business plan. In addition, suppliers opened a new €25 million credit line for MV.

According to the press Giovani Castiglioni expected more investments from Mercedes-AMG which didn't hurry with it. To the beginning of 2016, Mercedes-AMG became ready to sell non-core asset with debts of over 40 million euros. However, taking into account the clause in the loan agreement with BPM that allows the bank to demand early repayment of debt, if Mercedes-AMG participation in the authorized capital of MV Agusta falls below 20%, the situation became difficult. Due to debts grow, suppliers began to refuse massively shipments of the components. Finally MV Agusta was forced to call for a judge protection to avoid bankruptcy.

In March 2016, municipal court of Varese approved the protective act "Concordato di continuità" (English: continuity agreement), putting a moratorium on creditors' requirements for the period of a new investor search. MV Agusta from its side was obliged to reduce production from 9,000 motorcycles per year to 6,000-7,000, to reduce R&D costs from 15 million euros to 7 million, to reduce expenses for the racing division Reparto Corse from 4 million euros to 600 thousand. In addition MV had to fire at least 200 employees. This was followed in early April by reports that MV was negotiating the repurchase of AMG's 25% stake in the company and looking for a new major investor, whilst retaining the majority shareholding of the Castiglioni family. Even of greater concern, were reports that MV were not delivering any spare parts and that the factory might have ceased production. However, the final debt restructuring plan was approved by the court only in December 2017 when a new investor came.

=== Since 2017 ===
In November 2016, Giovanni Castiglioni and the UK-Russian fund COMSAR Invest (part of the Black Ocean Group, managed by the Sardarov family) agreed to conclude an investment agreement. The new debt restructuring plan for MV Agusta Motor S.p.A. was approved by the court in March 2017. At the same time the protective act "Concordato di continuità" (English: continuity agreement) was extended. To the mid of 2017 Black Ocean Group acquired 49% of the shares of MV Agusta Holding (parent company of MV Agusta Motor S.p.A.) and Giovanni Castiglioni kept 51%.

Mercedes-AMG received payment from the parties for its 25% in November 2017.

In March 2018, Giovanni Castiglioni, the CEO of MV Agusta, announced that the company was working on three new motorcycles based on a new 1,000 cc engine. The bikes consisted of a naked roadster, a café style roadster, and a replacement of the F4 superbike that will cease production in December 2018. The F4 replacement could be electric/gas hybrid, reportedly making more than 300 horsepower, and potentially would not be ready for production until 2021.

At the EICMA 2018, MV Agusta announced a new family of 1,000 cc in-line "fours" created by MV technical director Brian Gillen and chief designer Adrian Morton. Brutale 1000 Serie Oro with 208 hp (or 212 hp with full exhaust system) and 115 Nm allowed to achieve a maximum of 312 km/h, was introduced as the world's most powerful and fastest naked bike. It was also won a title of the most beautiful bike of EICMA 2018 (35% of visitors' votes ahead of 19% for Ducati Hypermotard SP and 9% for Aprilia RSV4 1100 Factory).

At EICMA 2018 MV Agusta also introduced two new models. The first was the world's first neo-classic racer Superveloce 800 Serie Oro, built on the platform of the F3 800 (148 hp) with the design inspired by Italian sports cars of the 1960s and 1970s. The second one was the F4 Claudio – the last and the greatest model in the F4 history that paid tribute to Claudio Castiglioni. Superveloce 800 Serie Oro was limited by 300 units and F4 Claudio – by 100 units.

At the end of 2018, MV Agusta was recapitalized by extra 40 million euros. In the same year, Timur Sardarov was appointed the CEO of MV Agusta.

In October 2019, MV presented a new five-year business plan, promising annual production growth up to 25,000 units in 5 years. Massimo Bordi, was appointed deputy general director, and Paolo Bettin was appointed financial director. Former president of the company Giovanni Castiglioni kept the role of a consultant. The plan also included a strategic expansion into new market segments, including adventure, electric recreational, and urban mobility.

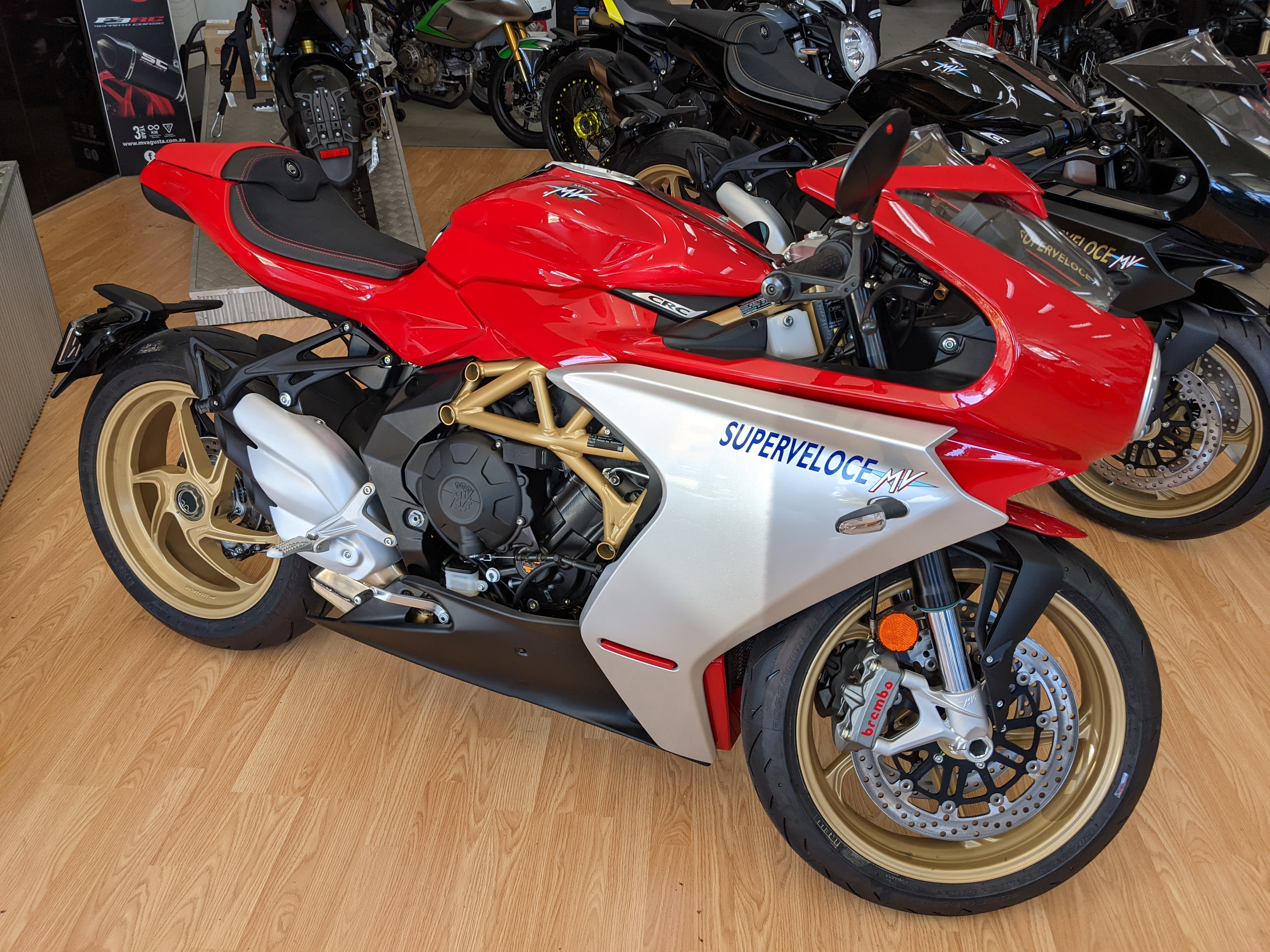
MV Agusta Superveloce 800 2020 model

In 2020, MV Agusta produced the MV Agusta Superveloce, a retro racer styled motorcycle based on the F3 800 Supersport. It is described by MV Agusta as "a modern interpretation of the iconic stylistic concept of the MV Agusta. A fusion of vintage and contemporary ensures that the future incorporates the memories of good times gone by"

In July 2021, the segment expansion took place when MV Agusta launched its e-bike line, AMO, with two models, the AMO RR and AMO RC. Later that year, in November 2021, the company unveiled the Rapido Serie Oro, an electric scooter.

In November 2022, Pierer Mobility acquired a 25.1% minority stake in MV Agusta by way of a capital increase. Pierer Mobility, will provide MV Agusta with supply chain support, take over of purchasing and global sales activities. In March 2024, the stake was increased to 50,1%.

In 2023, MV Agusta's entry into the adventure segment, initiated with the Lucky Explorer project, culminated in the launch of the LXP (Luxury Performance) adventure series. In November, the company released the LXP Orioli, a limited-edition model of 500 units paying tribute to two-time Dakar winner Edi Orioli. In early 2024, the standard production version, the LXP Enduro Veloce, was unveiled, which combined a new 931cc three-cylinder engine with off-road capability.

In January 2025, with the financial crisis of Pierer Mobility (KTM) and its subsequent acquisition by Bajaj Auto, MV Agusta returns under the full control of the Sardarov Family.

== Racing history ==
=== Race wins (1948–1976) ===
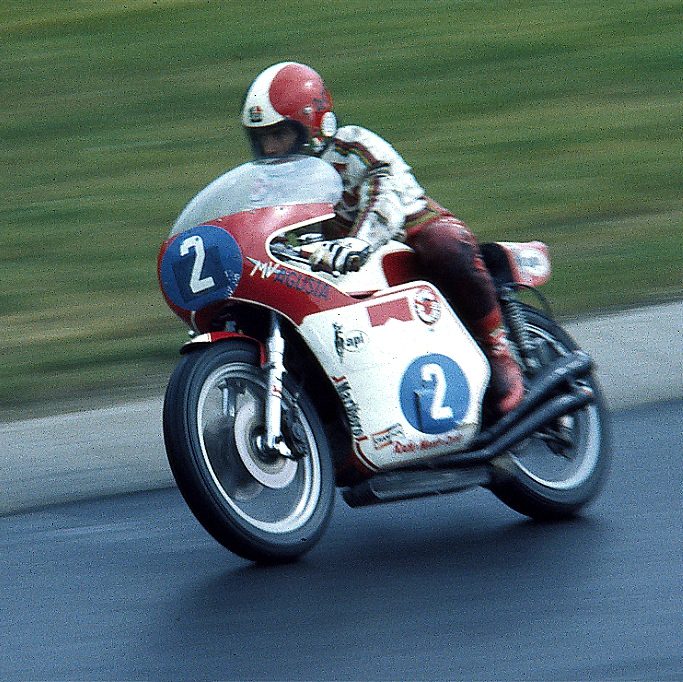
Giacomo Agostini on the MV Agusta 350 four-cylinder

The name of MV Agusta became popular in 1948 when Franco Bertoni won the 125 cc in the Italian Grand Prix. By that time, MV Agusta adopted the commercial slogan: "Racing experience at the service of mass production".

The manufacturer won its first world championship in 1952 with Cecil Sandford in the 125 cc class. Starting a domination in all classes, MV Agusta won the 125 cc, 250 cc, 350 cc and 500 cc titles simultaneously in 1958, 1959 and 1960. The Italian manufacturer made an impressive streak conquering all 500 cc class riders' championships between 1958 and 1974.

MV Agusta retired from Grand Prix racing at the end of the 1976 season, having won 270 Grand Prix motorcycle races, 38 World Riders' Championships and 37 World Constructors' Championships with legendary riders such as Giacomo Agostini, Mike Hailwood, Phil Read, Carlo Ubbiali, Gary Hocking and John Surtees.

=== MotoGP World Championship ===
MV Agusta won the following world titles:

- 500 cc class (John Surtees, Gary Hocking, Mike Hailwood, Giacomo Agostini, Phil Read)
  - 1956, 1958 to 1974
- 350 cc class (John Surtees, Gary Hocking, Mike Hailwood, Giacomo Agostini)
  - 1958, 1959 to 1961, 1968 to 1973
- 250 cc class (Carlo Ubbiali, Tarquinio Provini)
  - 1956, 1958 to 1960
- 125 cc class (Cecil Sandford, Carlo Ubbiali)
  - 1952, 1955, 1956, 1958 to 1960

Year	Champion			
Year	125 cc	250 cc	350 cc	500 cc
1952	(United Kingdom) Cecil Sandford ^{1}			
1955	(Italy) Carlo Ubbiali ^{1}			
1956	(Italy) Carlo Ubbiali ^{1}	(Italy) Carlo Ubbiali ^{3}		(United Kingdom) John Surtees ^{7}
1958	(Italy) Carlo Ubbiali ^{1}	(Italy) Tarquinio Provini ^{3}	(United Kingdom) John Surtees ^{5}	(United Kingdom) John Surtees ^{7}
1959	(Italy) Carlo Ubbiali ^{1}	(Italy) Carlo Ubbiali ^{4}	(United Kingdom) John Surtees ^{5}	(United Kingdom) John Surtees ^{7}
1960	(Italy) Carlo Ubbiali ^{1}	(Italy) Carlo Ubbiali ^{4}	(United Kingdom) John Surtees ^{5}	(United Kingdom) John Surtees ^{7}
1961			(Federation of Rhodesia and Nyasaland) Gary Hocking ^{5}	(Federation of Rhodesia and Nyasaland) Gary Hocking ^{7}
1962				(United Kingdom) Mike Hailwood ^{7}
1963				(United Kingdom) Mike Hailwood ^{7}
1964				(United Kingdom) Mike Hailwood ^{7}
1965				(United Kingdom) Mike Hailwood ^{7}
1966				(Italy) Giacomo Agostini ^{8}
1967				(Italy) Giacomo Agostini ^{8}
1968			(Italy) Giacomo Agostini ^{6}	(Italy) Giacomo Agostini ^{8}
1969			(Italy) Giacomo Agostini ^{6}	(Italy) Giacomo Agostini ^{8}
1970			(Italy) Giacomo Agostini ^{6}	(Italy) Giacomo Agostini ^{8}
1971			(Italy) Giacomo Agostini ^{6}	(Italy) Giacomo Agostini ^{8}
1972			(Italy) Giacomo Agostini ^{6}	(Italy) Giacomo Agostini ^{8}
1973			(Italy) Giacomo Agostini ^{6}	(United Kingdom) Phil Read ^{8}
1974				(United Kingdom) Phil Read ^{9}
Machines	^{1} 125 Bialbero	^{3} 250 Monocilindrica^{4} 250 Bicilindrica	^{5} MV Agusta 350 Four^{6} MV Agusta 350 Three	^{7} MV Agusta 500 Four^{8} MV Agusta 500 Three^{9} MV Agusta 500 Four

=== MotoGP World Constructors' Champions ===
- 500 cc class
  - 1956, 1958, 1959, 1960, 1961, 1962, 1963, 1964, 1965, 1967, 1968, 1969, 1970, 1971, 1972, 1973
- 350 cc class
  - 1958, 1959, 1960, 1961, 1968, 1969, 1970, 1971, 1972
- 250 cc class
  - 1955, 1956, 1958, 1959, 1960
- 125 cc class
  - 1952, 1953, 1955, 1956, 1958, 1959, 1960

=== Isle of Man Tourist Trophy ===
MV Agusta also won races in the famous Tourist Trophy. Giacomo Agostini made his Tourist Trophy debut in 1965 in the junior class on an MV 350 three-cylinder and finish third. He participated in 16 TT races, all on MV Agustas, he won the race 10 times, retired three times and was on the podium in the other races. He completed a senior-junior double in 1968, 1969, 1970 and 1972. Mike Hailwood won the Tourist Trophy on an MV Agusta four times, three in senior class and one in junior class. John Surtees turned to MV Agusta in 1956 and won the senior class. In 1958, he finished the junior and senior classes in first position, a feat he repeated in 1959. He also won the 1960 edition. MV Agusta won the Tourist Trophy 34 times.

Year	Isle of Man TT Winners			
Year	Ultra-Lightweight TT 125 cc	Lightweight TT 250 cc	Junior TT 350 cc	Senior TT 500 cc
1952	(United Kingdom) Cecil Sandford ^{1}			
1953	(United Kingdom) Leslie Graham ^{1}			
1955	(Italy) Carlo Ubbiali ^{1}	(United Kingdom) Bill Lomas ^{2}		
1956	(Italy) Carlo Ubbiali ^{1}	(Italy) Carlo Ubbiali ^{3}		(United Kingdom) John Surtees ^{7}
1958	(Italy) Carlo Ubbiali ^{1}	(Italy) Tarquinio Provini ^{3}	(United Kingdom) John Surtees ^{5}	(United Kingdom) John Surtees ^{7}
1959	(Italy) Tarquinio Provini ^{1}	(Italy) Tarquinio Provini ^{4}	(United Kingdom) John Surtees ^{5}	(United Kingdom) John Surtees ^{7}
1960	(Italy) Carlo Ubbiali ^{1}	(Italy) Carlo Ubbiali ^{4}	(United Kingdom) John Hartle ^{5}	(United Kingdom) John Surtees ^{7}
1962			(United Kingdom) Mike Hailwood ^{5}	(Federation of Rhodesia and Nyasaland) Gary Hocking ^{7}
1963				(United Kingdom) Mike Hailwood ^{7}
1964				(United Kingdom) Mike Hailwood ^{7}
1965				(United Kingdom) Mike Hailwood ^{7}
1966			(Italy) Giacomo Agostini ^{6}	(Italy) Giacomo Agostini ^{8}
1968			(Italy) Giacomo Agostini ^{6}	
1969			(Italy) Giacomo Agostini ^{6}	(Italy) Giacomo Agostini ^{8}
1970			(Italy) Giacomo Agostini ^{6}	(Italy) Giacomo Agostini ^{8}
1971				(Italy) Giacomo Agostini ^{8}
1972			(Italy) Giacomo Agostini ^{6}	(Italy) Giacomo Agostini ^{8}
Machines	^{1} 125 Bialbero	^{2} 203 Bialbero^{3} 250 Monocilindrica^{4} 250 Bicilindrica	^{5} MV Agusta 350 Four^{6} MV Agusta 350 Three	^{7} MV Agusta 500 Four^{8} MV Agusta 500 Three

=== Return to racing ===
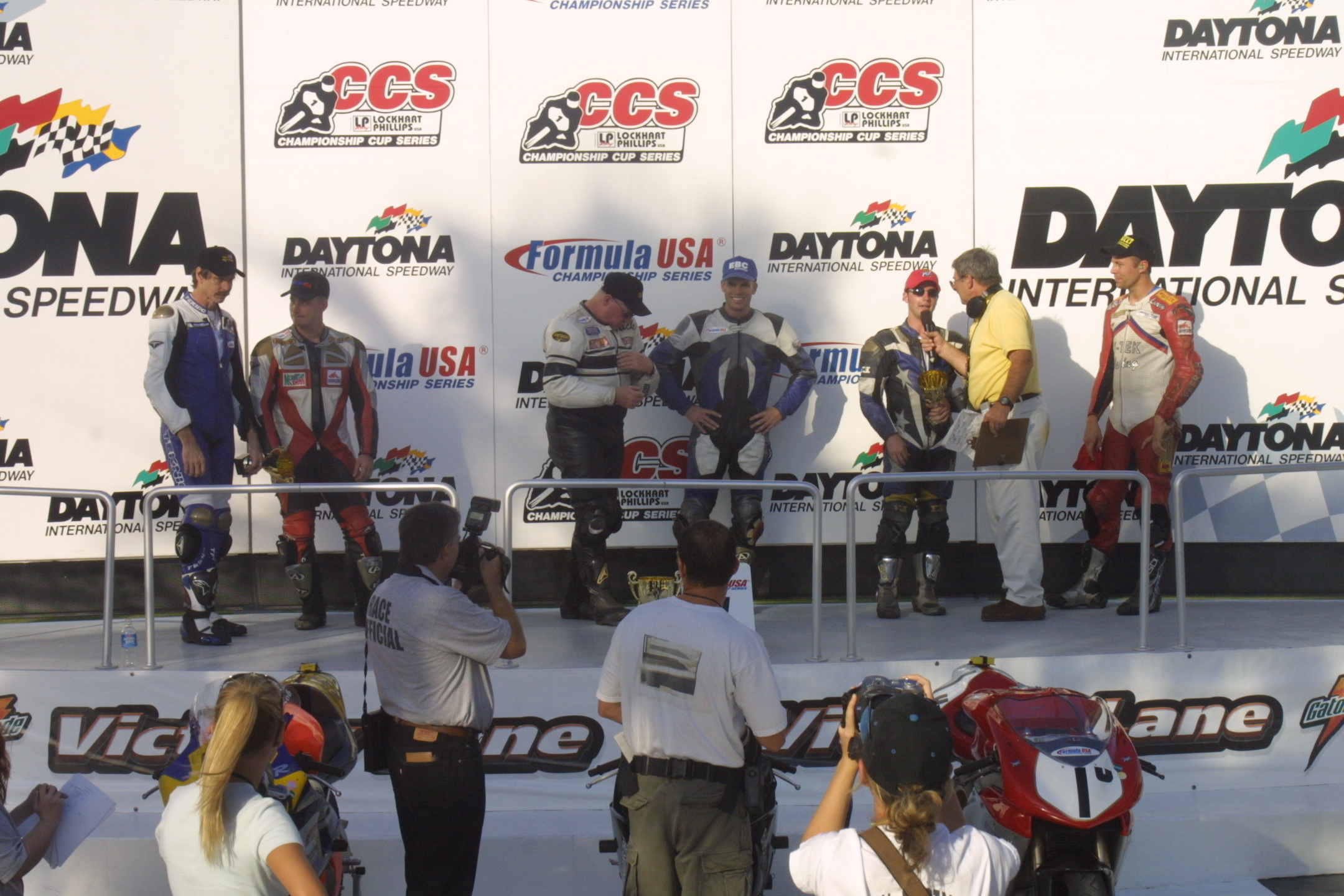
Daytona International Podium, MV Agusta F4

Although there were no factory racing efforts, independent ("privateer") teams were racing the F4 750. In 2003 Big Show Racing of Chicago, Illinois, USA, fielded an F4 750 in the Formula USA, Daytona International Speedway 200 Mile Team Challenge. The team placed second overall with riders Larry Denning and Aaron Risinger piloting the bike.

In 2004 the company made a semi-official return to racing, backing the MV Agusta Deutschland team in the IDM German Superbike championship: Jörg Teuchert claimed two wins riding a F4 1000S, marking the company's return to a victory since Agostini's 1976 German Grand Prix win. In 2005 the racing activities were expanded to the FIM Superstock 1000 Cup with Italian teams EVR Corse and Gimotorsports.

MV Agusta won the Italian Superstock Championship in 2006 with Luca Scassa, 30 years after its last title (Agostini's 1976 500cc Italian Championship). In 2008 Scassa won the Italian Superbike Championship on a factory-backed machine from the racing department in Schiranna, Varese Italy.

Team Fast by Ferracci entered two F4s for Luca Scassa and Matt Lynn in the 2007 AMA Superbike Championship season.

The company planned its return to racing for the 2008 Superbike World Championship season: Carl Fogarty's English-based Team Foggy Racing was going to run the team; However the project was aborted due to a lack of sponsorship.

In 2013 two MV Agusta F4-RR were entered by Grant Racing in the British Superstock Championship. The MV Agusta F3 675 competed in the 2013 Supersport World Championship season with two bikes managed by Team ParkinGO; Roberto Rolfo and Christian Iddon rode the bikes achieving three podiums.

In 2018 it was announced that MV Agusta would return to Grand Prix racing as well with Forward Racing in Moto2. The new bike will begin testing in July for a return to racing in the 2019 season. It will be the first time since 1976 that MV Agusta will have an entry on the grand prix entry list when it dropped out due to financial difficulties. In November 2018, Stefano Manzi and Dominique Aegerter were announced as the team's two riders in the manufacturer's return to Grand Prix racing.

The new bike also features a new engine package built for it. The aging Honda CBR600RR inline-4 engine – which had been used since the inaugural Moto2 season back in 2010 – was replaced by a 765 cc (46.7 cu in) triple cylinder engine developed by Triumph Motorcycles based on the Street Triple RS 765.

=== MV Agusta Reparto Corse ===
In 2014 MV Agusta made the official return to racing establishing the MV Agusta Reparto Corse works team, managing both World Superbike and Supersport activities.

== Classic product history ==
=== Classic street models (1946–1980) ===
- 98 cc 1946–1949
- 125 twin 1947
- 125 3-speed 1948–1949
- 125 TEL 1949–1954
- 125 CSL scooter 1949–1951

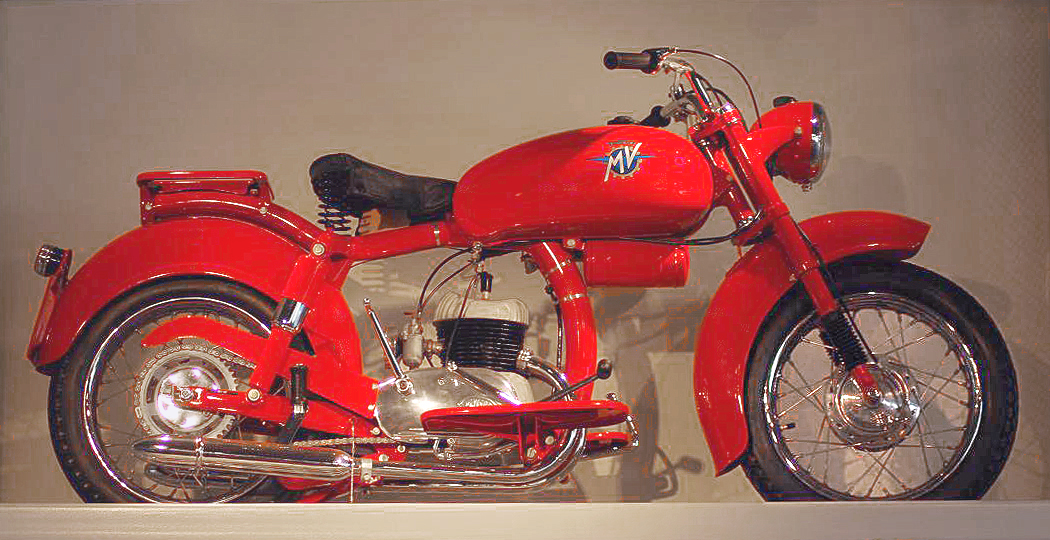
1956 Pullman 125 cc

- 250 1947–1951
- 125 Motore Lungo 1950–1953
- 125 CGT scooter 1950–1952
- 500 Turismo 1950
- Ovunque scooter 1951–1954
- 150 1952–1953
- 175 CS 1953–1959
- Pullman 1953–1956
- 125 Turismo Rapido 1954–1958
- 48 moped 1955–1959

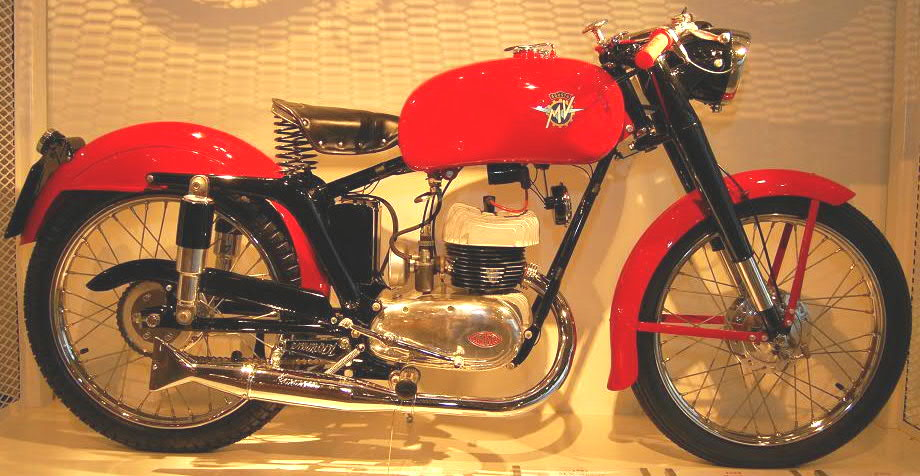
1952 150 cc Turismo

- Super Pullman 1955–1958
- 300 twin 1955
- 250 Raid and 300 Raid 1956–1962
- Ottantatre 83 cc 1958–1960
- 175 AB 1958–1959
- 125 TREL. Centomila 1959–1963
- 150 4T 1959–1970
- Chicco scooter 1960–1964
- 235 Tevere 1959–1960

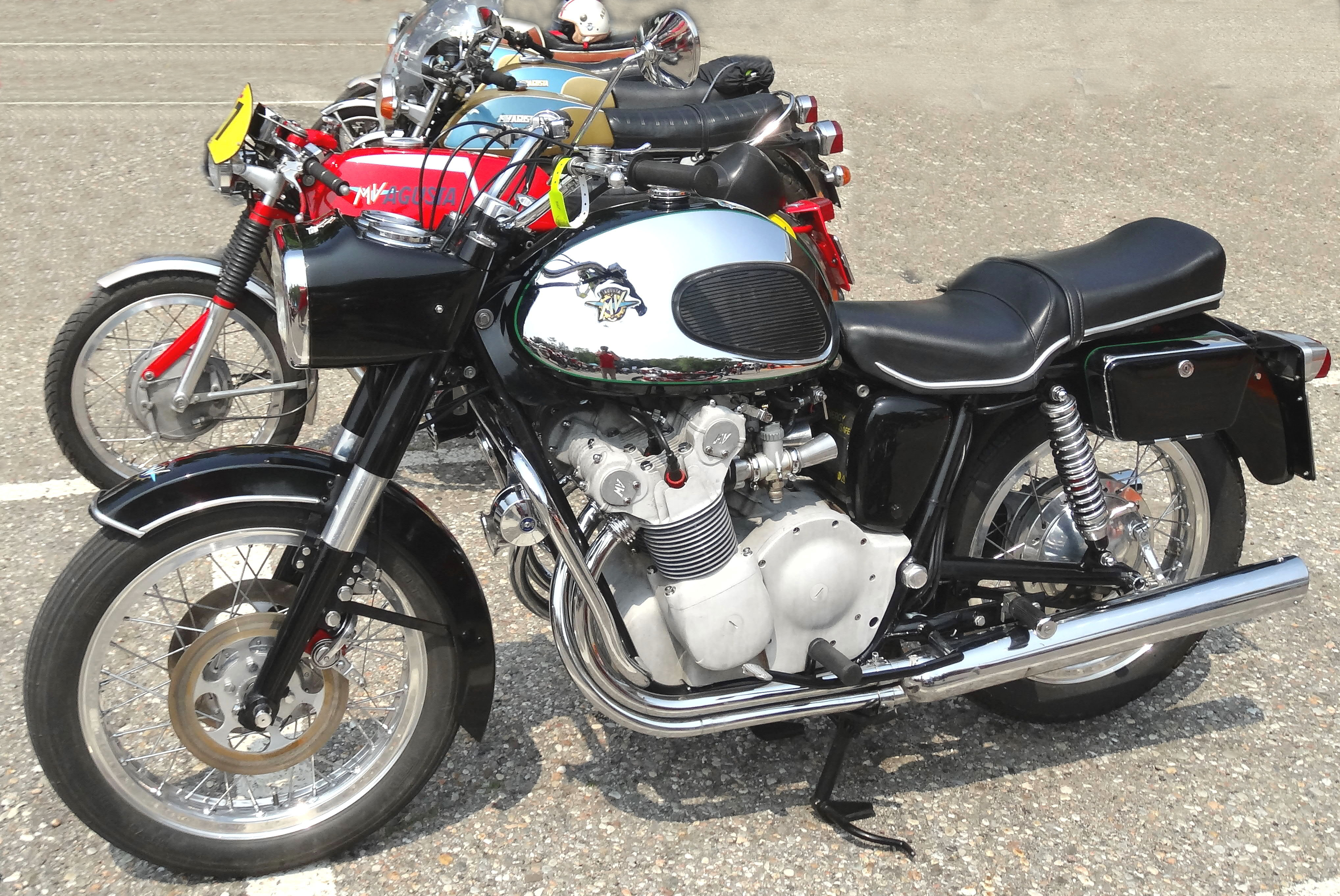
MV Agusta 600 with disc brakes from 1967

- Checca ( 83 cc, 99 cc, 125 cc ) 1960–1969
- Liberty 50 cc 1962–1969

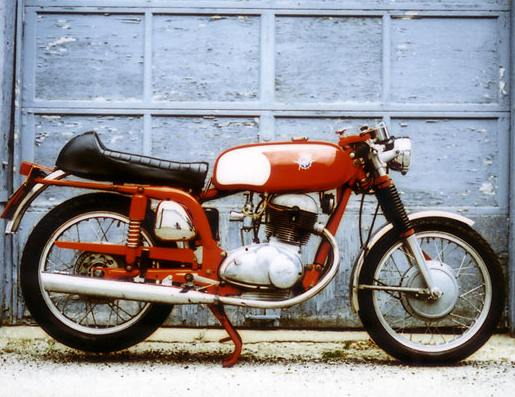
1972 MV Agusta 350

- Germano 50 cc 1964–1968
- Arno 166 GT 1964–1965
- 125 GT-GTL 1964–1973
- 125 Regolarità 1965–1970
- 250B 1968–1971
- 600 tourer
- 750 GT
- 750SS
- 750 Sport (drum brake) 1972–1974
- 750 Sport (disc brake) 1974
- 750 Sport America 1975–1978
- 850SS
- MV Agusta 350B Sport 1970–1974
- 350 Ipotesi 1975–1977
- 125 Sport 1975–1980

=== Race models (1946–1976) ===
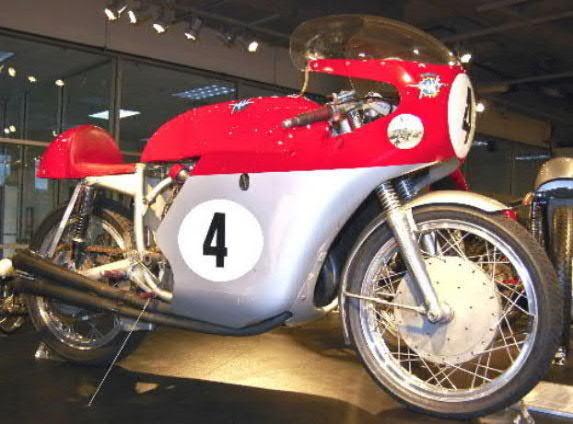
MV Agusta 500 cc 1964

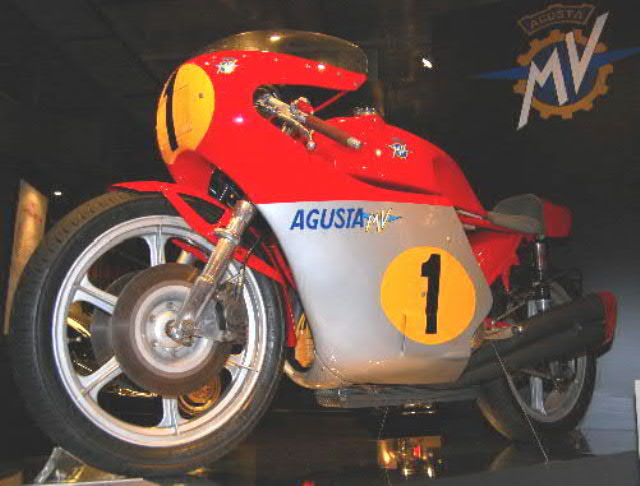
500 cc four 1974

- 98/125 two-stroke 1946–1949
- 125 Bialbero 1950–1960
- 125 Monoalbero 1953–1956
- 125 disc valve 1965
- 175 CSS-5V 1954–1960
- 175 Bialbero 1952–1958
- 203 Bialbero 1955
- 220 Bialbero 1955
- 250 Monocilindrica Bialbero 1956–1959
- 250 Bicilindrica 1959–1961
- 350 four 1954–1964
- 350 twin 1957
- 350 six 1957
- 350 three 1965–1973
- 350 six 1968
- 350 four 1972–1976
- 500 four 1950–1966
- 500 three 1966–1973
- 500 four 1973–1976
- 500 six 1957–1958

== Modern product history (from 1998) ==
=== MV Agusta F4 ===
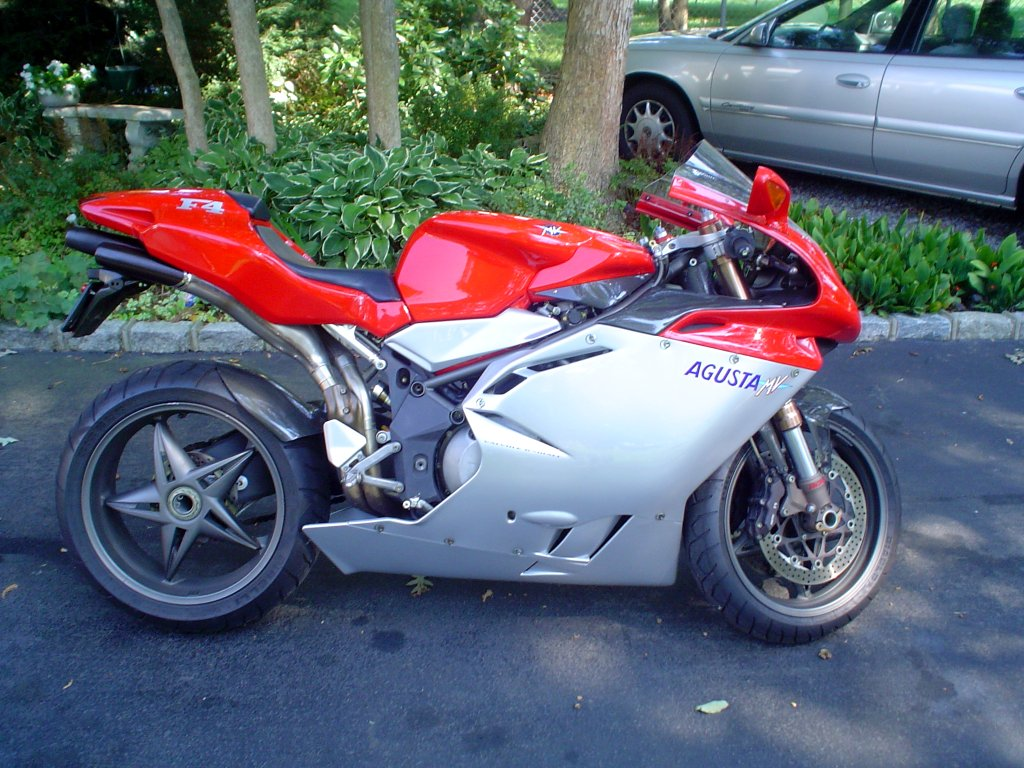
MV Agusta F4 750 S

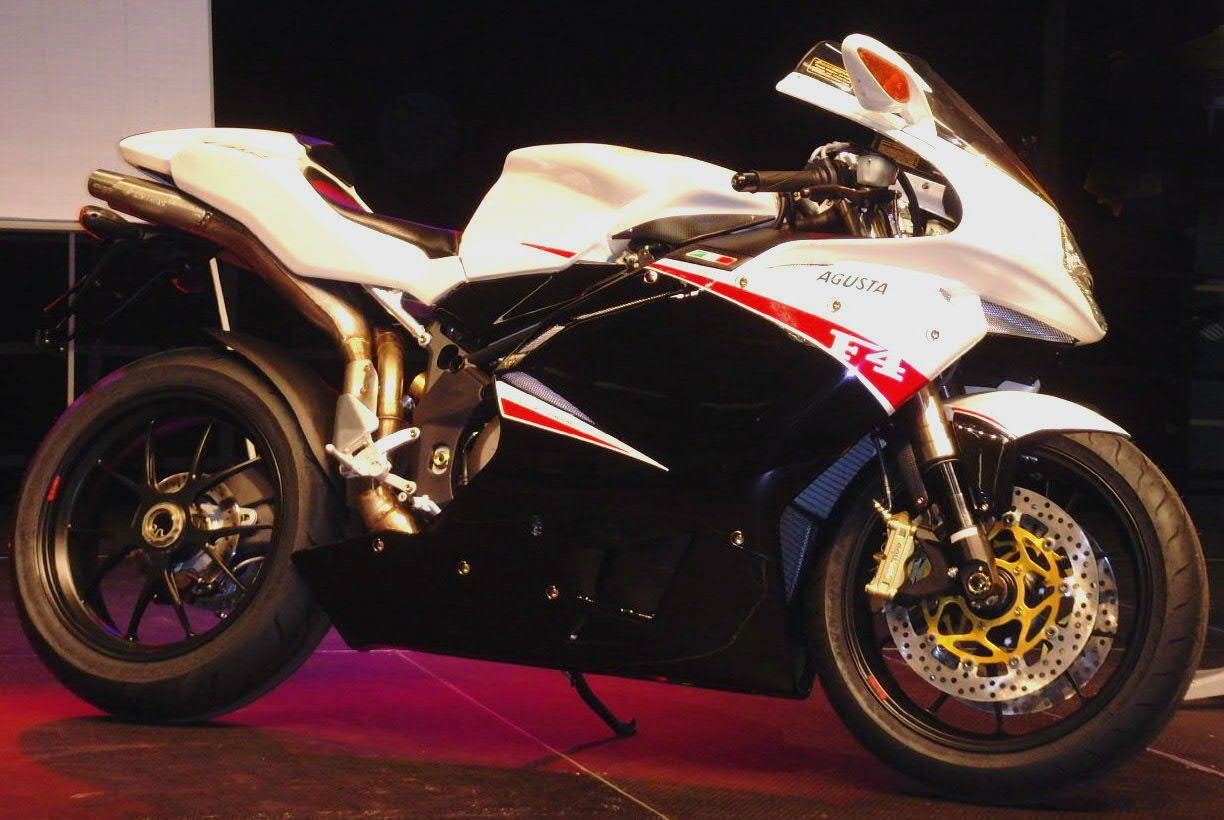
MV Agusta F4 1000 R 312

1st Generation		2nd Generation
750 cc	1,000 / 1,078 cc	1,000 cc
Production models
F4 750 S (2000); F4 750 S 1+1 (2000); F4 750 S Evo 02 (2002); F4 750 S Evo 02 1+1 (2002); F4 750 S Evo 03 (2003); F4 750 S Evo 03 1+1 (2003)	F4 1000 S (2005); F4 1000 S 1+1 (2005); F4 1000 R (2007); F4 1000 R 1+1 (2007); F4 R 312 (2008); F4 RR 312 (2009)	F4 (2010); F4 RR (2011); F4 R (2012)
Limited edition models
F4 Serie Oro (1999-2002) [300 total]; F4 750 S Neiman Marcus Edition (2000) [10 total]; F4 Senna 750 (2002) [300 total]; F4 SPR (2004) [300 total]; F4 SP (2004) [300 total]	F4 Ago (2005) [300 total]; F4 Tamburini (2005) [300 total]; F4 1000 Veltro (2006) [21 total]; F4 CC (Claudio Castiglioni) (2007) [100 total]; F4 Senna 1000 (2007) [300 total]; F4 1078 RR 312 Edizione Finale (2010) [30 total]	F4 Frecce Tricolori (2010) [11 total]; F4 RC (2015) [250 total]; F4 LH44 (2017) [44 total]; F4 Claudio (2019) [100 total]
CRC limited edition kits
F4 SP-01 Viper (2002) [SP-01 - 50 total]	F4 Mamba (2005) [SP-02 (basic) / SP-03 (full optional)- 300 total / SP-04 (standard) - 300 total]; F4 Corse (2006) [SP-14 (monoposto) - 300 total / SP-15 (biposto) - 300 total]	

=== MV Agusta Brutale ===
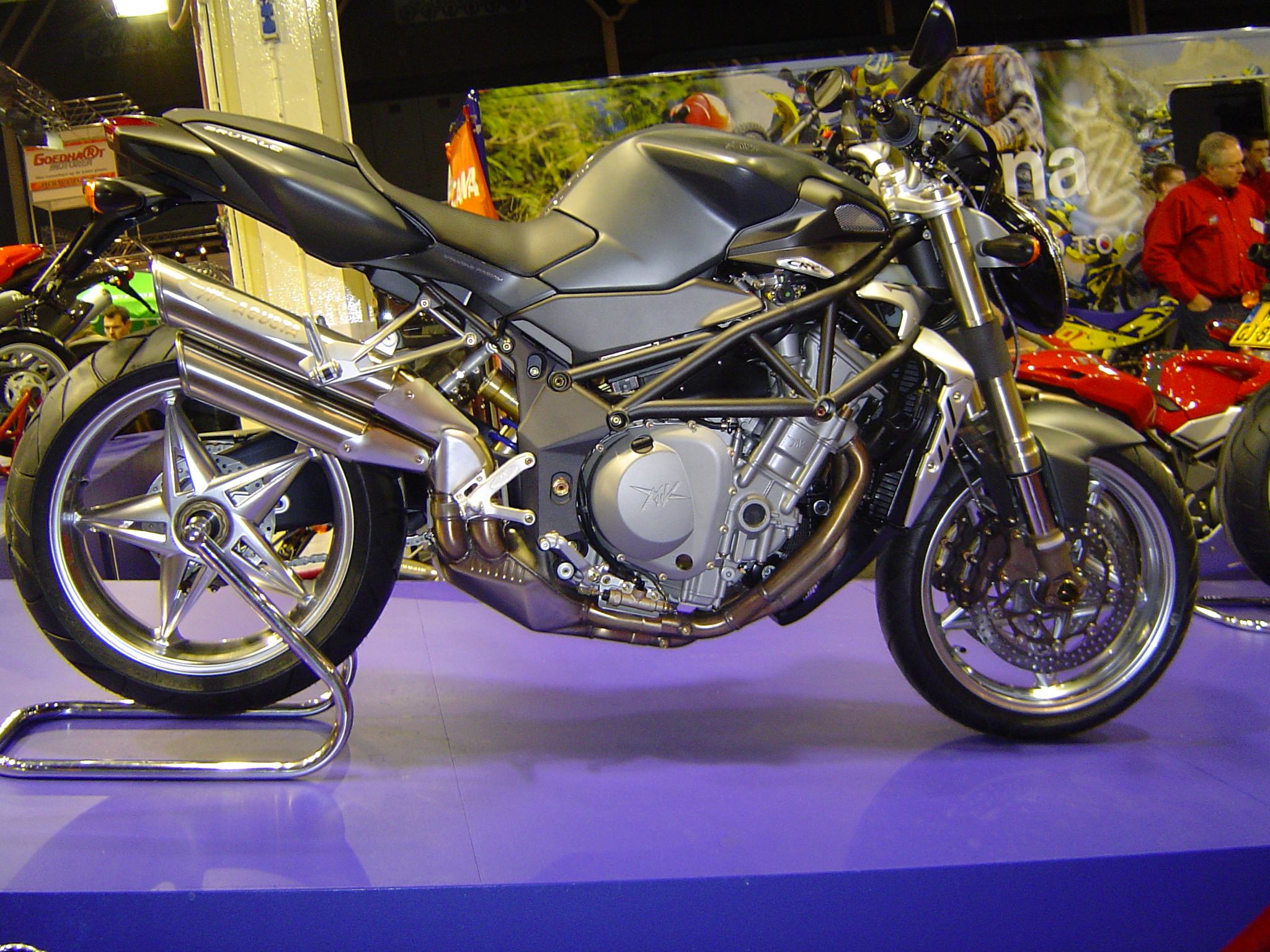
2007 MV Agusta Brutale 910 S

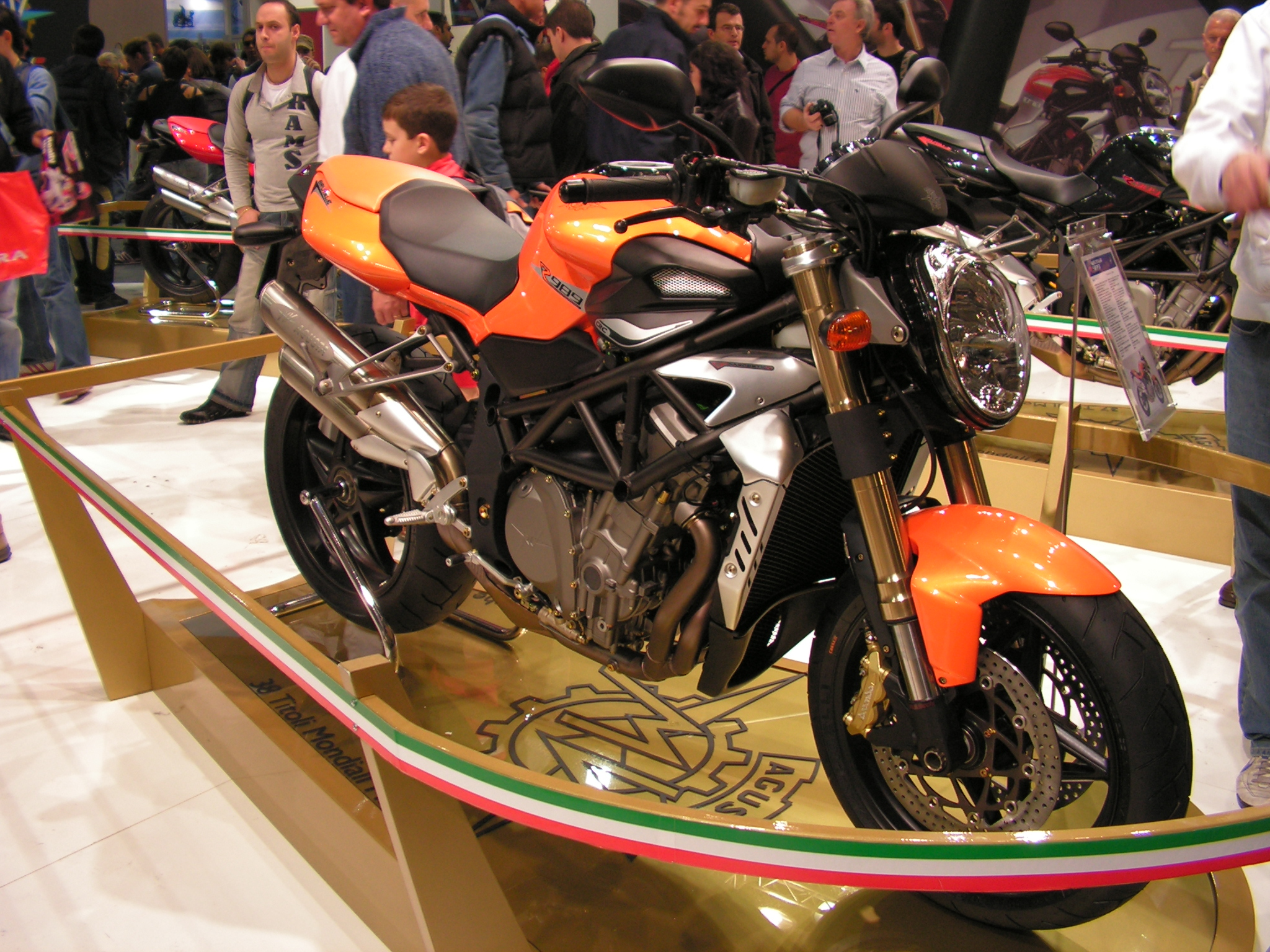
2007 MV Agusta Brutale 989 R

First Generation
750 cc	910 cc	1,000 cc	1,078 cc
Production models
Brutale 750 S (2002)	Brutale 910 S (2006); Brutale 910 R (2006)	Brutale 989 R (2008)	Brutale 1078 RR (2008)
Limited edition models
Brutale 750 Serie Oro (2002) [300 total]	Brutale 910 R Italia (2006) [124 total]; Brutale 910R Hydrogen (2007) [100 total]; Brutale 910 R Wally (2008) [118 total]; Brutale 910R Starfighter (2008) [99 total]; Brutale 910R Starfighter Titanium (2008) [23 total]		Brutale 1078 RR Jean Richard (2008)
CRC limited edition kits
Brutale America (2005) [SP-05 (basic) - 300 total / SP-06 (full options) - 300 total]; Brutale CRC (2005) [SP-07 (basic) - 300 total / SP-08 (full options) - 300 total]; Brutale Mamba (2006) [SP-09 (basic) - 300 total / SP-10 (full options) - 300 total / SP-11 (standard)]; Brutale Gladio (2006) [SP-12 (basic) - 300 total / SP-13 (full options) - 300 total]			

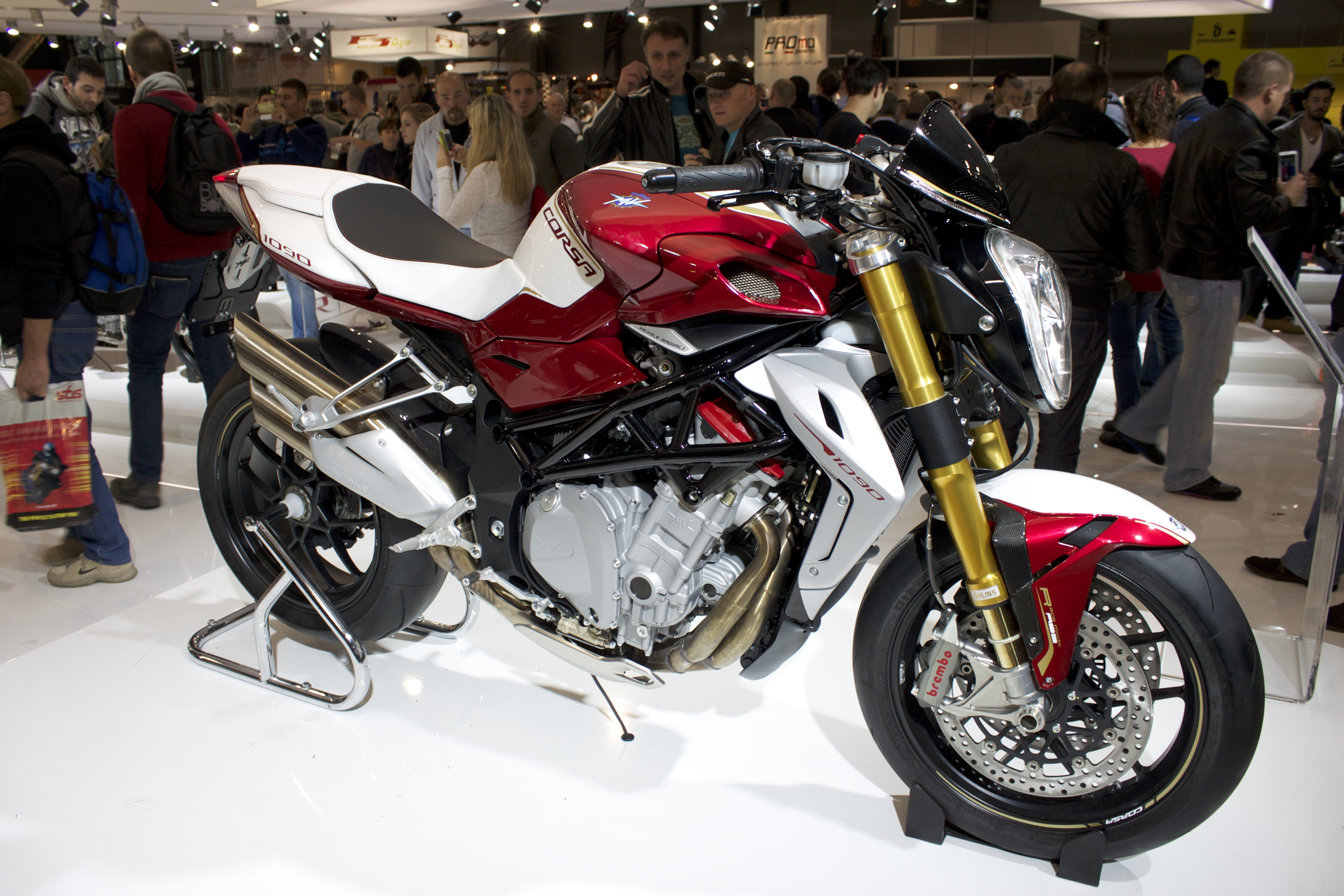
2013 MV Agusta Brutale 1090 RR Corse

Second generation
920 cc	1,000 cc	1,078 cc
Production models
Brutale 920 (2011)	Brutale 990 R (2010)	Brutale 1090 RR (2010)
Limited edition models
	Brutale 990 R Brand Milano (2010) [1 total]; Brutale 990 R LE 150th Anniversary (2011) [150 total]	Brutale 1090 RR Corse (2013)
CRC limited edition kits
		Brutale 1090 RR Cannonball (2010)

Third generation
675 cc	800 cc	1,000 cc
Production models
Brutale 675 (2012)	Brutale 800 (2013); Brutale 800 RR (2015); Brutale 800 RR SCS (2020); Brutale 800 Rosso (2020)	Brutale 1000 RR (2020); Brutale 1000 RS (2021)
Limited edition models
	Brutale 800 RC (2018) [350 total]; Brutale 800 RR LH44 (2018) [144 total]; Brutale 800 RR Pirelli (2019)	Rush 1000 (2022) [350 total]: Brutale 1000 Serie Oro (2019) [300 total]

=== MV Agusta F3 ===
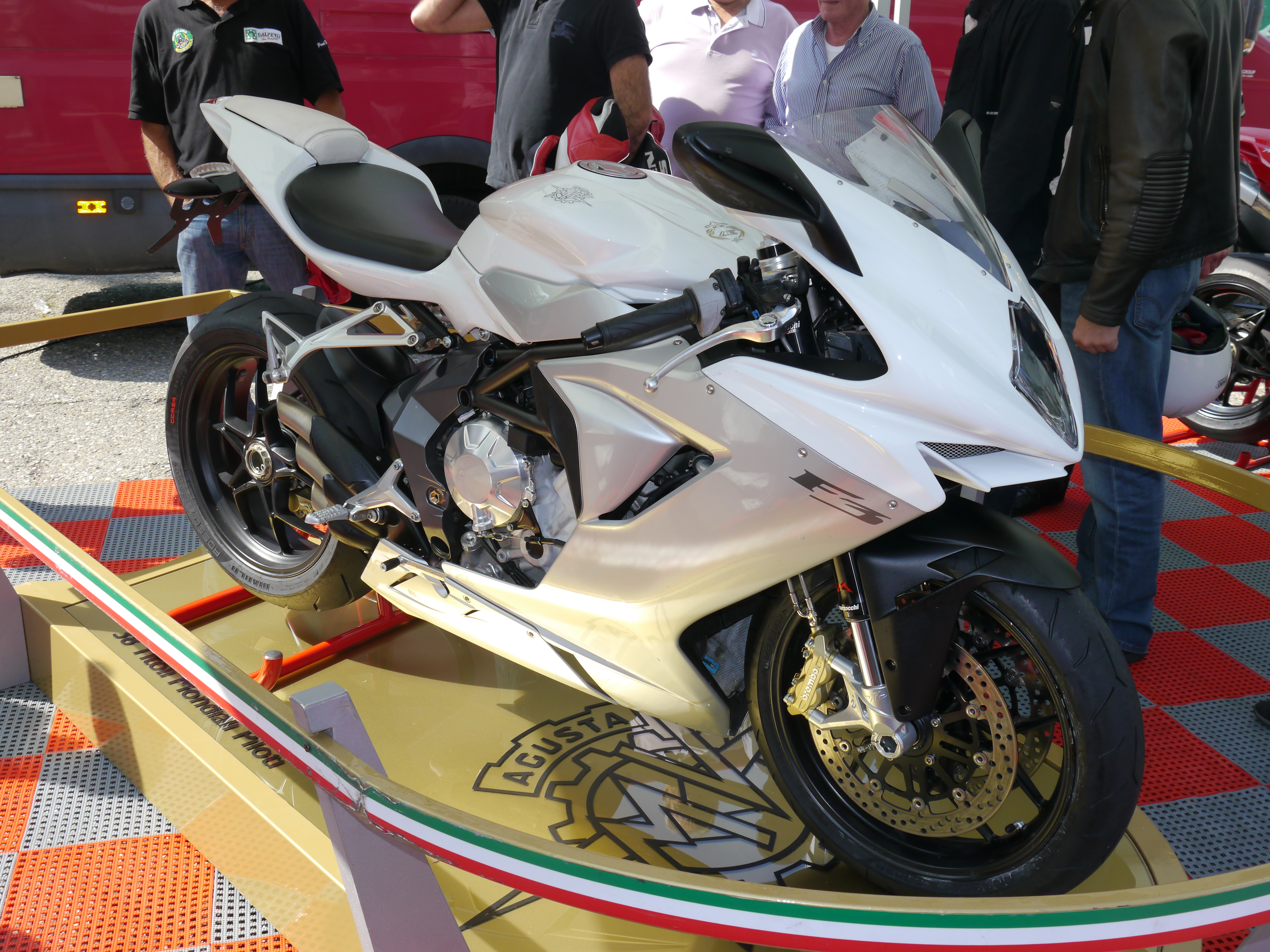
MV Agusta F3

675 cc	800 cc
Production models
F3 675 (2013)	F3 800 (2013); F3 Rosso (2021); F3 RR (2021)
Limited edition models
F3 Serie Oro (2013) [200 total]; F3 675 RC (2018) [350 total]	F3 800 AGO (2014) [300 total]; F3 800 RC (2018) [350 total]; F3 XX (2019)

=== MV Agusta Rivale ===
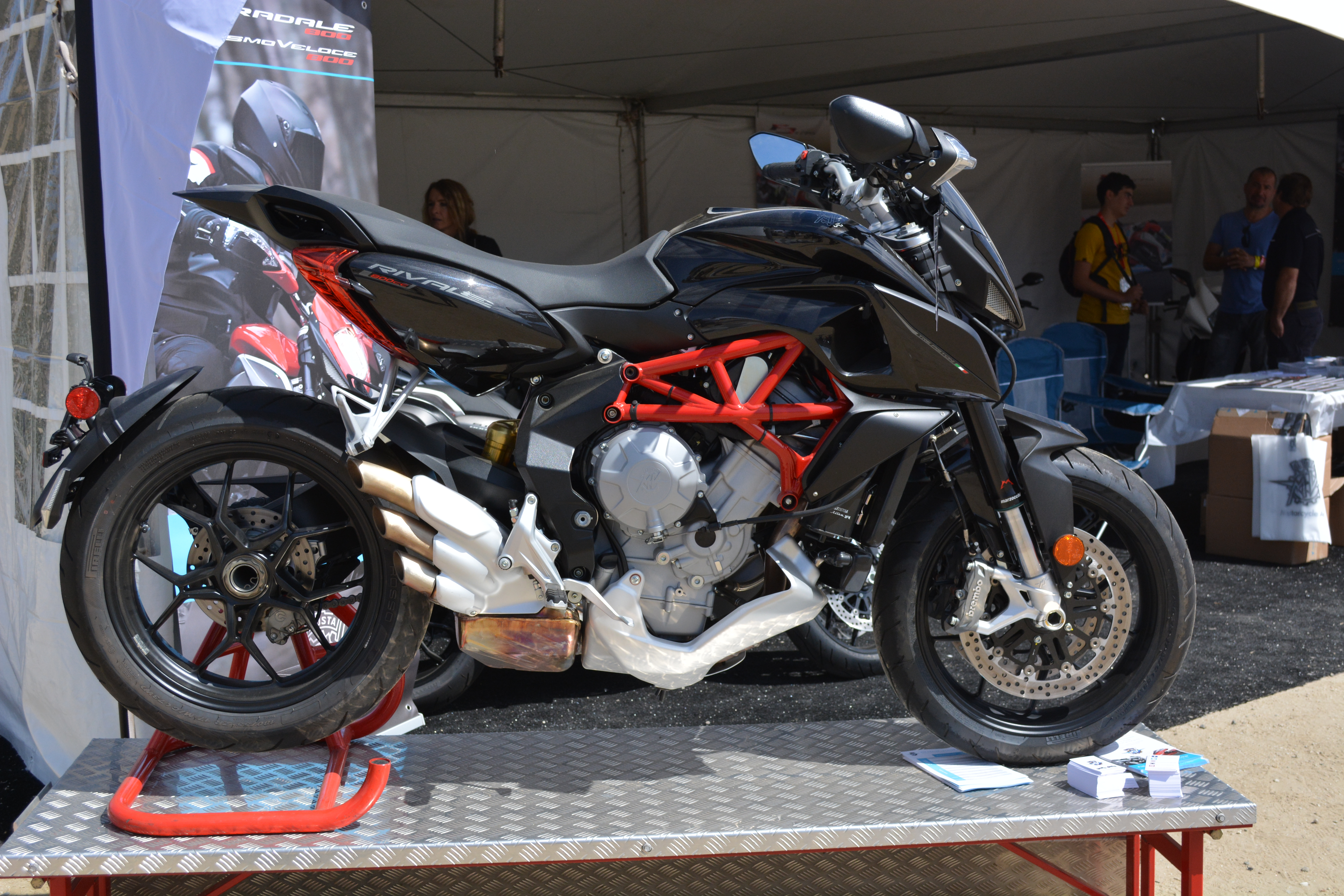
MV Agusta Rivale

- Rivale (2013)

Limited editions

- Rivale Urban Camo (2014)

=== MV Agusta Dragster ===
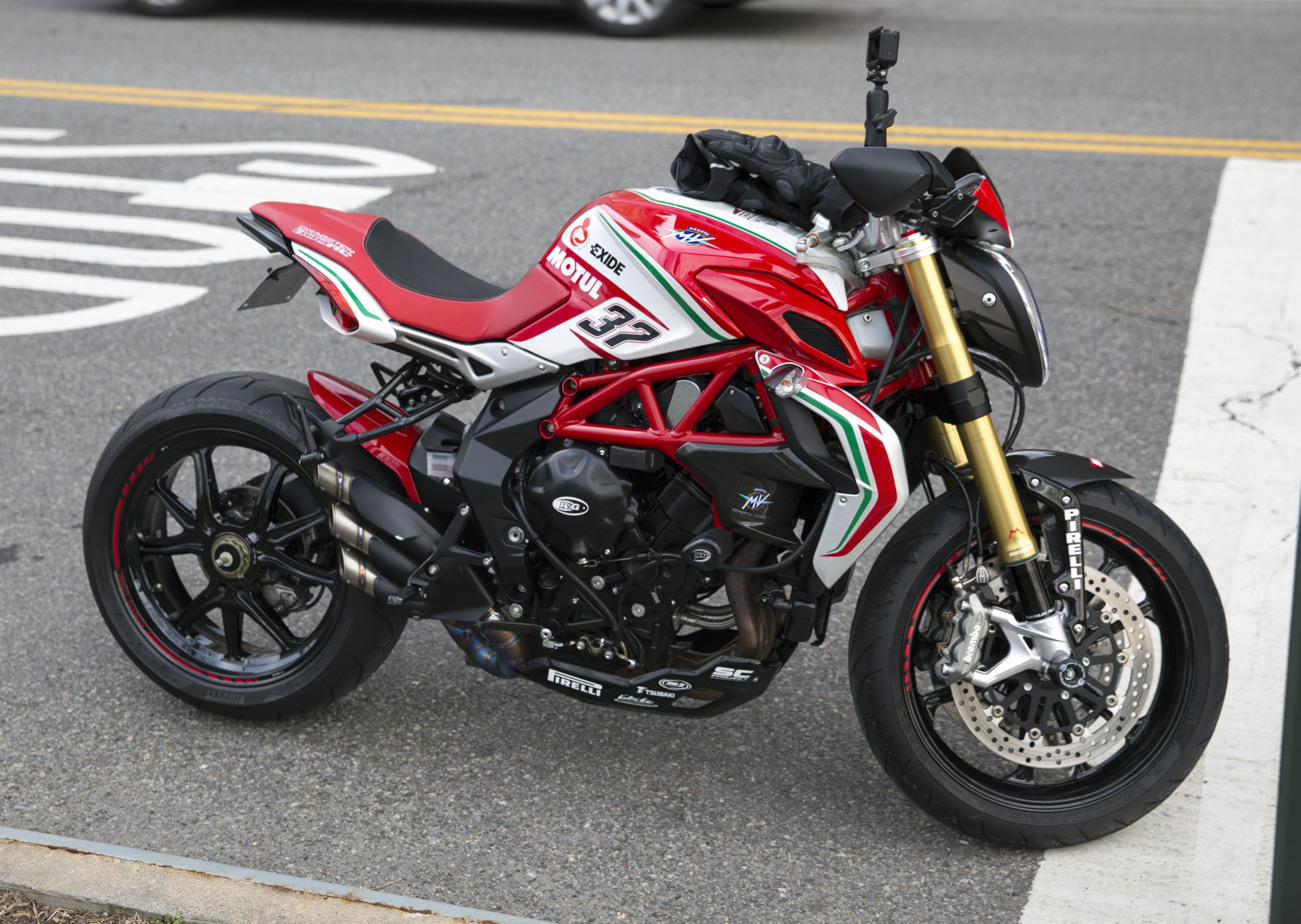
2017 MV Agusta Dragster 800 RC

- Dragster 800 (2014)
- Dragster 800 RR (2015)
- Dragster 800 RR SCS (2020)
- Dragster 800 Rosso (2020)

Limited editions

- Dragster 800 RC (2017) [350 total]
- Dragster 800 RR LH44 (2018) [144 total]
- Dragster 800 RR Pirelli (2019)
- Dragster 800 RR America (2019) [200 units]
- Dragster 800 RC SCS (2021)

=== MV Agusta Stradale 800 ===
- Stradale 800 (2015)

=== MV Agusta Turismo Veloce 800 cc ===
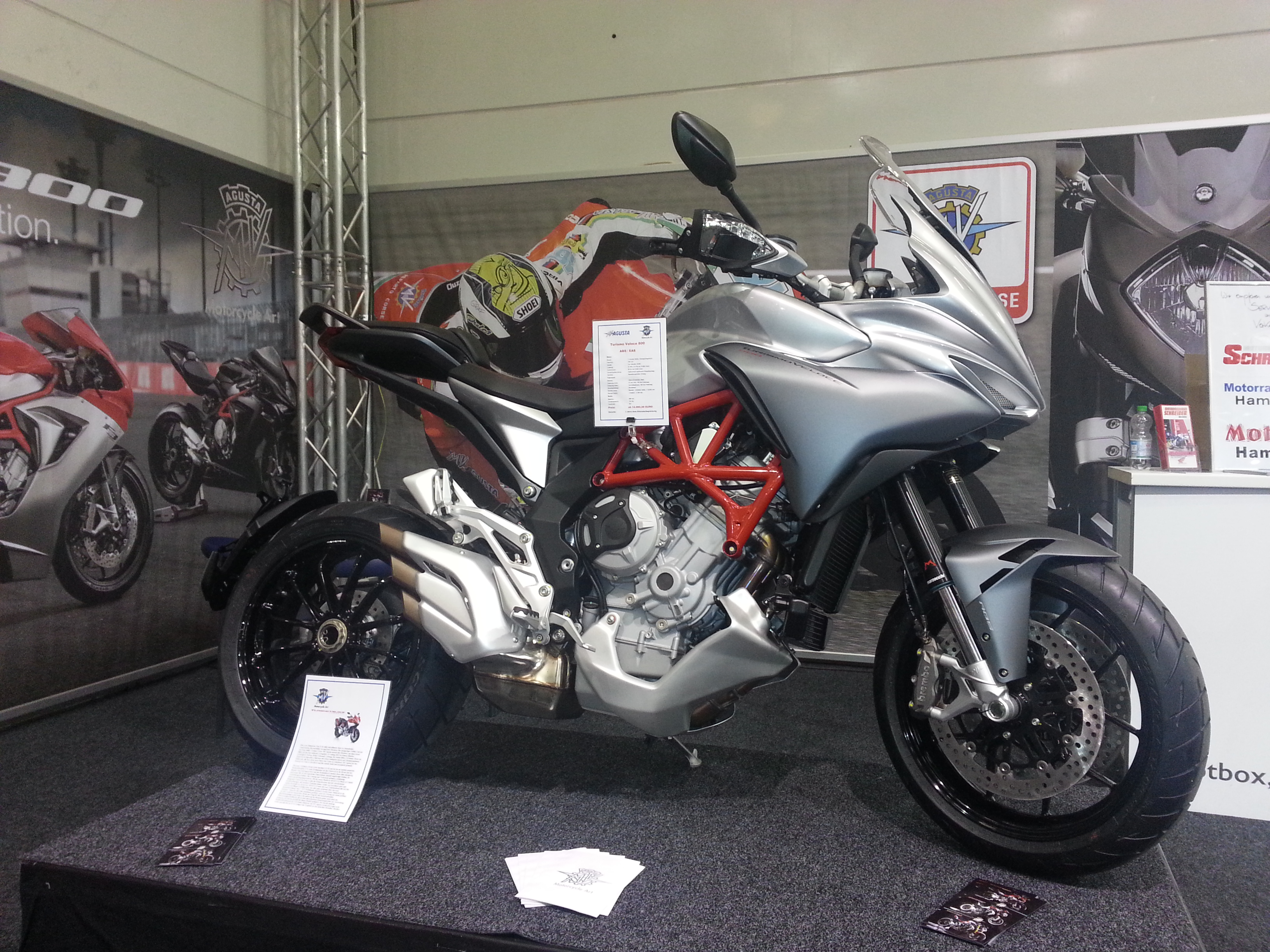
2015 MV Agusta Turismo Veloce

- Turismo Veloce (2015)
- Turismo Veloce Lusso (2018)
- Turismo Veloce Lusso SCS (2018)
- Turismo Veloce 800 Rosso (2020)

Limited editions

- Turismo Veloce RC (2017) [250 total]
- Turismo Veloce RC SCS (2019) [250 total]

=== MV Agusta RVS#1 ===
- RVS#1 (2019)

=== MV Agusta Superveloce ===
- Superveloce 800 (2020)
- Superveloce 800 (2021)

Limited editions

- Superveloce 800 Serie Oro (2020) [300 total]
- Superveloce 800 Alpine (2020) [110 total]
- Superveloce 800 Ago (2021) [311 total]
- Superveloce 1000 Serie Oro (2022) [500 total]
- Superveloce 1000 Ago (2025) [83 total]

=== MV Agusta Rush 1000 ===
Limited editions

- Rush 1000 (2020) [300 total]

== Leadership ==
- Count Domenico Agusta (1945–1971)
- Corrado Agusta (1973–1980)
- Claudio Castiglioni (1992–2011)
- Giovanni Castiglioni (2011–2019)
- Timur Sardarov (2019–2024)
- Hubert Trunkenpolz (2024)
- Luca Martin (2024–present)

== See also ==
- Museo Giacomo Agostini
- List of Italian companies
- List of motorcycle manufacturers
