= MV Agusta Rush 1000 =

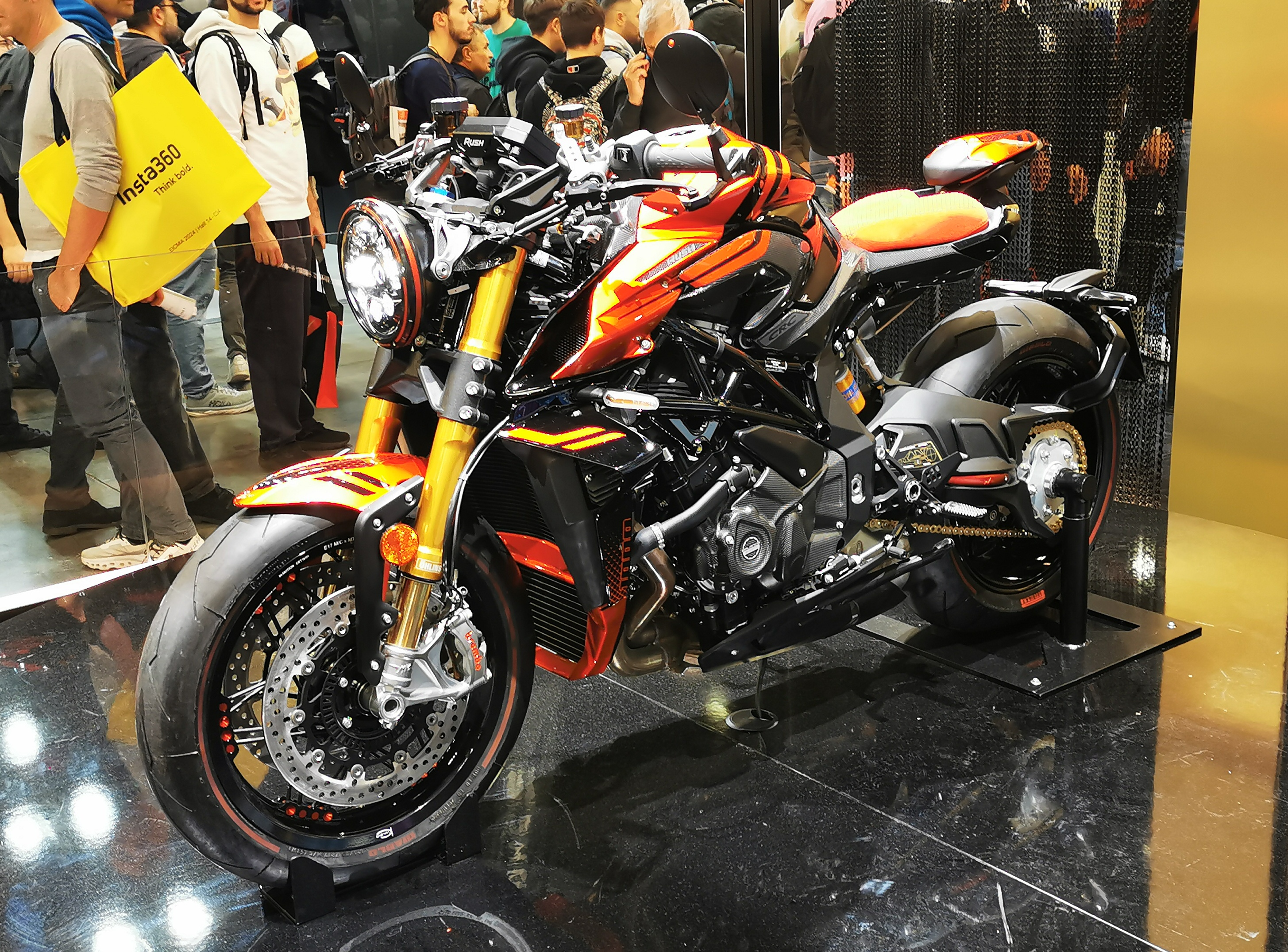
- Manufacturer: MV Agusta
- Production: 2020-
- Assembly: Varese, Italy
- Class: Streetfighter
- Engine: 998 cc four cylinder, 4 stroke, 16 valve, DOHC
- Bore / stroke: 79 x 50.9mm
- Compression ratio: 13.4:1
- Power: 205 bhp
- Transmission: Wet multi-plate clutch, 6 gears, chain drive
- Frame type: Lattice
- Suspension: Front: Telescopic forks Rear:Single-sided swingarm with single shock absorber
- Brakes: Disc brakes
- Tires: Front:120/70 ZR17; Rear:200/55 ZR17
- Rake, trail: 97 mm
- Wheelbase: 1415 mm
- Seat height: 845 mm
- Weight: 405 pounds (184 kg) (dry)
- Related: MV Agusta Dragster; MV Agusta Brutale; MV Agusta F3; MV Agusta F4

The MV Agusta Rush 1000 is a limited-edition streetfighter motorcycle produced by the Italian manufacturer MV Agusta. The drag-race-inspired machine is based on the Brutale 1000RR and was first shown at the 2019 Milan EICMA show. Production was limited to 300 machines, and manufacture started in June 2020.

== Engine ==
The Rush uses the same F4 derived engine as the Brutale 1000RR. The liquid cooled inline four cylinder four-stroke is set across the frame and has two overhead camshafts (DOHC), 16 'radial' valves, electronic multipoint fuel injection, and induction discharge electronic ignition with a displacement of 998 cc (60.9 cu in). The engine was uprated for the Brutale 1000RR and Rush with titanium conrods, new valve guides, cams and ECU. Power output is 205 bhp, or 209 bhp with the optional race exhaust and ECU fitted.

== Chassis ==
The engine hangs from a tubular aluminium and steel trellis frame and is a stressed member. The rear suspension is a single-sided swinging arm controlled by an Öhlins EC suspension unit. Front suspension is by semi-active Öhlins forks and the twin font and single rear disc brakes are from Braking. The front wheel is spoked and the rear forced alloy with a carbon fibre cover.

Many of the body parts are manufactured from CNC-machined aluminium, titanium, and carbon fibre, giving a dry weight of 405 pounds (184 kg)

== Electronics ==
A full electronics suite is fitted to the bike, including traction and launch control systems, up/down quickshifter, ABS, anti-wheelie, cruise control and electronic suspension. Four rider modes (Sport, Race, Rain and Custom) are available.
