= MV Agusta Stradale 800 =

Sport touring motorcycle produced by MV Agusta

- Manufacturer: MV Agusta
- Production: 2015-2017
- Successor: MV Agusta Lucky Explorer 9.5
- Class: Sport touring motorcycle
- Engine: 798 cc Three cylinder, 4 stroke, 12 valve, DOHC
- Bore / stroke: 79 mm x 54.3 mm
- Compression ratio: 13.3:1
- Power: 115 bhp (86 kW) @ 11,000 rpm
- Torque: 78.5 Nm @ 9,000 rpm
- Transmission: Hydraulically operated Wet multi-plate clutch, 6 gears, chain drive
- Frame type: Lattice
- Suspension: Front: 43 mm Marzocchi Telescopic forks Rear:Single-sided swingarm with single Sachs shock absorber
- Brakes: Front: Twin 320 mm Brembo discs Rear: Single 220 mm Brembo disc
- Tires: Front: 120/70-17; Rear: 180/55-17
- Rake, trail: 25.5°, 4.3 in (110 mm)
- Wheelbase: 57.5 in (1,460 mm)
- Dimensions: L: 83.9 in (2,130 mm); W: 35 in (890 mm)
- Seat height: 34.25 in (870 mm)
- Weight: 399 lb (181 kg) (dry)
- Fuel capacity: 4.2 US gal (16 L; 3.5 imp gal)
- Related: MV Agusta Rivale

The MV Agusta Stradale 800 is a sport touring motorcycle that was produced by the Italian manufacturer MV Agusta from 2015 to 2017.

== Background ==
The model was inspired by the Ducati Hyperstrada shown at Milan EICMA show in 2012. Initially a more comfortable seat and mini luggage bags were fitted to the Rivale, but the modified machine had rough steering reactions. This prompted a new frame to be designed to overcome the steering problems. During development the machine was nicknamed lo scooterone (the maxi-scooter) within MV.

The machine is a product of MV's British designer Adrian Morton, and pre-production models were available for the press to test in December 2014 between Casares and Ronda in Andalusia, Spain. It was officially released at the 2014 EICMA show.

== Technical details ==
=== Engine ===
The liquid cooled 800 cc engine, which was originally designed by Ezio Mascheroni for use in the MV Agusta F3, is the larger of the two "triples" produced by MV at this time. The engine has a counter rotating crankshaft, normally only found on GP machines, which counteracts the centripetal forces of the wheels allowing the bike to turn faster.

A specific version of the engine has been produced for the Stradale. Bore and stroke dimensions of 79 mm and 54.3 mm are retained, as are the compression ratio and valve sizes. The inlet tracts have been reduced and only one injector per cylinder is fitted. This reduces peak power to 115 hp @ 11,000 rpm but gives a more tractable engine. Usable torque is available from 2,000 rpm.

The machine is fitted with a hydraulic clutch, which reduces the width of the engine by 40 mm. A quickshifter and a ‘blipper’ downshifter are fitted to the 6 speed gearbox.

=== Chassis ===
As is usual on modern MVvs, the lattice frame is made from steel tubes with aluminium sections around the swinging arm pivots, but with increased rake and trail to improve stability. The single sided swinging arm is lengthened by 30 mm and controlled by a single Sachs shock. A re-positioned linkage between swinging arm and shock absorber allows 6” of rear wheel travel. 43 mm Marzocchi front forks are fitted, which also have 6” (152mm) of travel. Front and rear suspension is infinitely adjustable. Brakes are from Brembo, the front being 320 mm double discs with radial four-pot calipers, and the rear a single 220 mm with twin pot caliper.

Rear panniers with built in lights and, a first for MV, a small adjustable screen are fitted. A new 4.2-gallon fuel tank is fitted that is shorter, allowing a longer seat and brings the riders weight forward. A larger silencer with three tail pipes is fitted which reduces noise to a lower level than other MVs.

=== Electronics ===
The machine is fitted with an Eldor Nemo EM30 ECU, which includes four rider-selectable engine maps: Rain, Normal, Sport and Custom. The custom mode offers adjustable throttle-response maps, torque-delivery curves, engine braking and traction control. ABS and an anti-stoppie device are also fitted to the machine.

The machine has a TFT dashboard, which includes a fuel gauge. This is the first MV model to be fitted with a fuel gauge.
