= Víctor Marchesini =

Víctor Marchesini may refer to:

- Víctor Marchesini (politician) (1930–1999), Argentine lawyer and politician
- Víctor Marchesini (footballer) (1960), Argentine footballer
