= MV Agusta RVS 1 =

Limited-edition motorcycle produced by MV Agusta

MV Agusta RVS#1
- Manufacturer: MV Agusta
- Production: 2019
- Class: Streetfighter
- Engine: Three cylinder, 4 stroke, 12 valve, DOHC
- Bore / stroke: 79 mm x 54.3 mm
- Compression ratio: 13.3:1
- Power: 150 bhp (110 kW) @ 12.800 rpm
- Torque: 87 Nm @ 10.100 rpm
- Transmission: Wet multi-plate slipper clutch, 6 gears, chain drive
- Frame type: Lattice
- Suspension: Front: Telescopic forks Rear:Single-sided swingarm with single shock absorber
- Brakes: Front: Twin 320 mm disc brakes, Brembo 4-pot calipers Rear: Single 220 mm disc brake with Brembo 2-pot caliper
- Tires: Front: 120/70ZR17; Rear: 180/55ZR17
- Wheelbase: 1380 mm (54.33 in)
- Dimensions: L: 2025 mm (79.72 in); W: 810 mm (31.89 in)
- Seat height: 795 mm (31.30 in)
- Weight: 168 kg (370.4 lbs) (dry)
- Related: MV Agusta Dragster series

The MV Agusta RVS#1 is a limited-edition motorcycle produced by the Italian manufacturer MV Agusta. This machine is the first product of MV Agusta's “Reparto Veicoli Speciali” (RVS) (Special Vehicles Operations) department, and a reinterpretation of the MV Agusta Dragster. It is powered by a 150 bhp (110 kW) version of the company's 800 cc three-cylinder engine. The machines are all hand assembled and went on sale in 2019.

== Background ==
MV Agusta's CEO, Giovanni Castiglioni, set up a new division, the RVS, to design special and premium models. The first project was a reinterpretation of the Dragster. The machine was designed in conjunction with the C.R.C. (Castiglioni Research Centre) who provided the engineering expertise.

== Technical details ==
=== Engine ===
The 799 cc engine, originally designed by Ezio Mascheroni and first fitted to the F3, uses a DOHC inline three-cylinder layout with four valves per cylinder. A counter-rotating (reverse) crankshaft is used, which counteracts the centripetal forces of the wheels allowing the bike to turn faster. The bore and stroke are 79 mm and 54.3 mm.

Modified to meet the Euro4 European emission standards and tuned to produce 150 bhp (110 kW) at 12.800 rpm, the engine is the most powerful triple in the MV range. Power is fed through a six speed gearbox via a hydraulic slipper clutch. The gearbox is fitted with a quickshifter.

=== Cycle parts ===
As is usual for MV Agusta the frame is constructed of chrome-molybdenum tubing with an aluminium swinging arm mounts, and the engine acts as a stressed member. Marzocchi “Upside down” front forks are fitted which have a DLC (diamond like carbon) coating to reduce wear. The single sided swinging arms is controlled by a fully adjustable Sachs shock absorber.

The front brakes use distinctive SunstarBraking Batfly twin discs and Brembo radial 4-pot calipers with a single 2-pot Brembo caliper on the rear. Wheels are from Kineo with red highlights to the wire spokes.

Carbon fibre is used for many of the bodywork component. The tank has titanium inserts and the seat has a honeycomb stitched pattern with the bike's signature skull on it. A round LED headlight is fitted, the LED pattern changing with the angle of lean of the bike to provide optimum illumination. Two spotlights are also fitted on the side of the engine.

By the use of carbon fibre and titanium, the machine's weight had been reduced by 8 kg compared to the Dragster, to 160 kg.

=== Electronics ===
The machine is equipped with a full electronics suite. An LCD dashboard controls the MVICS system (Motor & Vehicle Integrated Control System), which includes an Eldor ECU, Mikuni ride by wire, traction control, Quickshifter EAS 2.0 and Bosch 9 Plus ABS with RLM (Rear wheel Lift-up Mitigation). The system offers many user-control settings.
