= Giovanni Andrea Fioroni =

Italian composer

Giovanni Andrea Fioroni (also Fiorini, Florono) was an Italian classical composer, maestro di cappella and organist born in Pavia in 1716, although he had studied music for fifteen years with Leonardo Leo in Naples. He composed many operas, oratorios and about 300 sacred vocal works in a contrapuntal style, many of them for large choirs.

He was first appointed as choirmaster in Como in 1747, moving on to the Milan Cathedral where he succeeded Giovanni Battista Sammartini as organist and then as a teacher. Highly regarded even by some of his major contemporaries, his students included Alessandro Rolla, Quirino Gasparini and Tommaso Marchesi, among others. He died in Milan in 1778.

== Musical works ==
- Requiem with Benedictus, for 4 voices
- Requiem with Benedictus, for 8 voices
- Requiem in F major, for 8 voices and strings
- In sole surgenti, (aka Inno per un giorno di festa) for 2 voices, bass and down to the organ
- La Didone abbandonata (1735)
- Angelus Domini, Motet for 5 voices
