= Marchesi =

Marchesi is a surname. Notable people with the surname include:

- Marchesi (title), or Marquess
- Blanche Marchesi (1863–1940), French opera singer and teacher, daughter of Mathilde Marchesi
- Concetto Marchesi (1878–1957), Italian politician
- Gerald Marchesi (1928–1990), Australian rules footballer
- Gualtiero Marchesi (1930–2017), Italian chef
- Louis Marchesi (1898–1968), founder of the Round Table
- Luigi Marchesi (disambiguation), multiple people
- Marcello Marchesi (1912–1978), Italian comic writer and director
- Mathilde Marchesi, née Graumann (1821–1913), German opera singer and teacher
- Pompeo Marchesi (1783–1858), Italian sculptor
- Rino Marchesi (1937–2026), Italian footballer and manager
- Tommaso Marchesi (1773–1852), Italian composer
