= Marchesini =

Marchesini is a surname. Notable people with the surname include:

- Alessandro Marchesini (1664–1738), Italian painter and art merchant of the late-Baroque and Rococo
- Anna Marchesini (1953–2016), Italian actress, voice actress, comedian, impressionist and writer
- Ascanio Marchesini (died 1580), Italian Roman Catholic prelate
- Bruno Marchesini (1915–1938), Italian Roman Catholic seminarian
- Giulia Marchesini (born 1998), Italian professional racing cyclist
- Michele Marchesini (born 1968), Italian sailor
- Nino Marchesini (1895–1961), Italian actor
- Pietro Marchesini (1692–1757), Italian painter of the Baroque period
- Riccardo Marchesini (born 1963), Italian canoer and paracanoer
- Víctor Marchesini (1930–1999), Argentine lawyer and politician

== See also ==
- Marchesi (surname)
