= MV Agusta Brutale series =

Series of Italian naked motorcycles

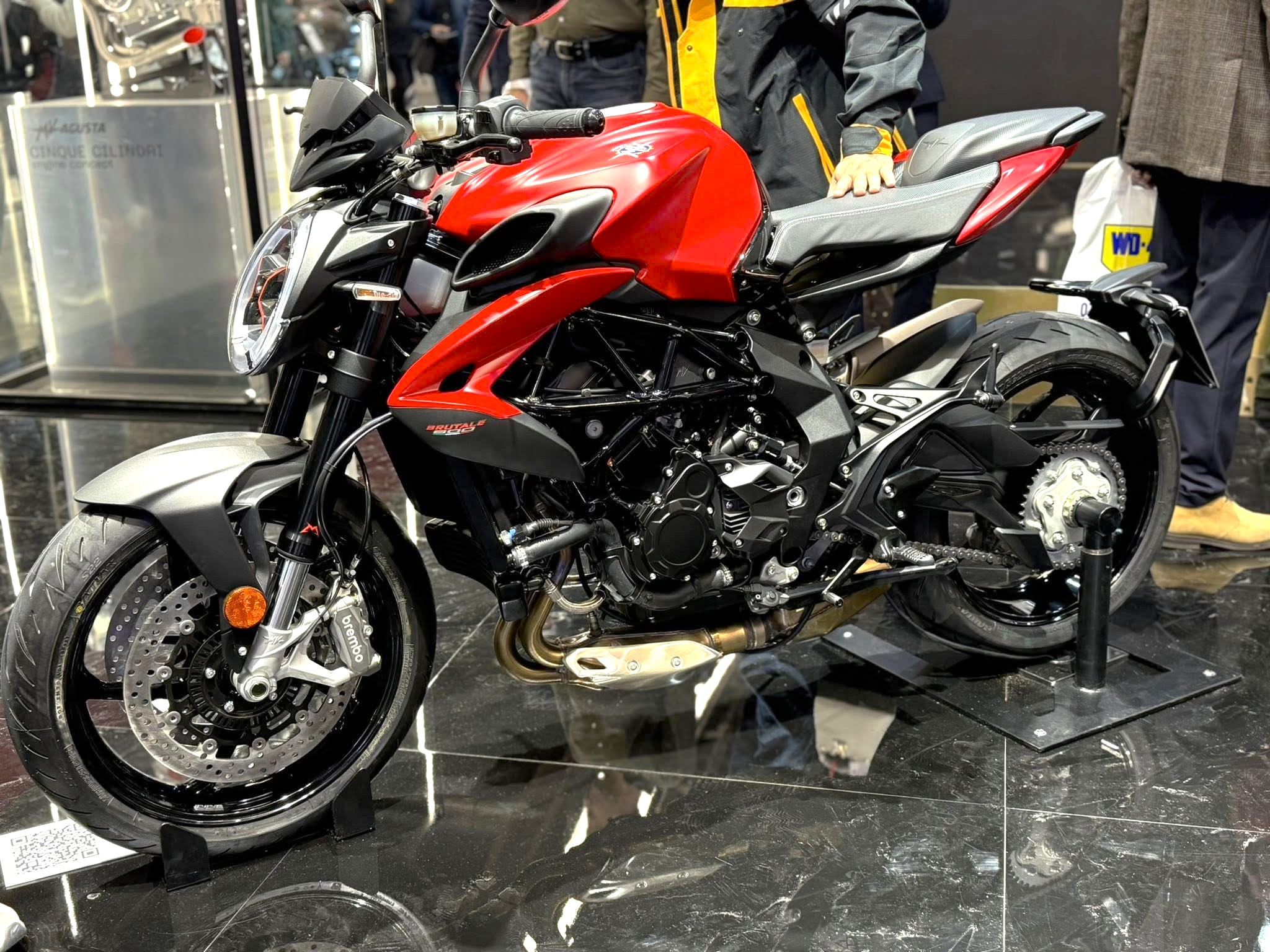
- 2026 MV Agusta Brutale 800
- Manufacturer: MV Agusta
- Production: 2001–present
- Class: Naked bike
- Related: MV Agusta F3; MV Agusta F4; MV Agusta Dragster

The MV Agusta Brutale series of motorcycles are manufactured by MV Agusta of Italy, starting in 2001. Its style is classified as a naked bike and the series consists of several models powered by either inline-four or inline-three, DOHC-engines in various capacities.

== History ==
=== Introduction ===
The motorcycle was designed by Italian motorcycle designer Massimo Tamburini. The engine was based on that used in the F4 series, which was developed by Andrea Goggi.

The engine is a liquid cooled inline four cylinder four-stroke set across the frame with two overhead camshafts (DOHC), 16 'radial' valves, electronic multipoint fuel injection, and induction discharge electronic ignition having engine displacements of 749.5 cc (45.74 cu in), 998 cc (60.9 cu in), and 1,078 cc (65.8 cu in). The engine was derived from the 1990–1992 Ferrari Formula One engine. Early in the design process Ferrari engineers assisted in the development of the engine. MV (Cagiva at the time) quickly deviated from the Ferrari design, but they kept one important feature, the radial valves. The engine, which produces 127 bhp (95 kW) and 75 Nm torque, is unique in the sense that it is the only recently produced radial-valved motorcycle engine.

A new chassis was created under the leadership of Technical Director Massimo Parent. The engine hangs from a tubular frame and is a stressed member. The machine has 50mm upside-down forks, developed for MV Agusta by Marzocchi, a Sachs rear shock absorber, a CNC milled 6-piston (front) and 4-piston (rear) brake system from Nissin. The wheels and swinging arm are made of aluminium. Other aluminium parts are the frame plates and the fork bridges.

The first model was introduced in 2001; the MV Agusta Brutale 750 Oro, which, like the MV Agusta F4 750 Series Oro, used many magnesium parts and was limited to 300 machines. This was followed in 2002 by the MV Agusta Brutale 750 S.

=== Evolution ===
In late 2005, a larger 910 cc engine was added to the range. The 998 cc engine from the F4 1000 S was taller than the 750 cc unit and could not be fitted. The 750 engine's bore was increased by 2.2 mm to 76 mm and the stroke by 6.3 mm to 51 mm to give 909 cc displacement. A top of the range model using the 1078 cc engine from the F4 was added in 2007, and a 982 cc variant in 2008.

Now under Harley Davidson ownership, the Brutale was redesigned for the 2010 model range. Two models were offered, the 990 R and the 1090 RR. Both engine and chassis were redesigned, 85% of the components on these machines had been completely redesigned. The engine was based on the previous 1078 engine and both displacements shared a common crankshaft. The frame was more compact and the swinging arm longer. A 921 cc entry-level model was added to the range in 2011.

In 2012, a new three-cylinder Brutale, based on the F3, was introduced. Initially only offered with the 675 cc engine, the 800 cc model was added a year later. The four-cylinder models were phased out following the introduction of the triples.

The four-cylinder engine was reintroduced in 2019 in the Brutale 1000 Serie Oro, which MV Agusta claimed to be the fastest naked bike in the world.

== Model variants ==
=== First generation ===
==== Brutale 750 Oro ====
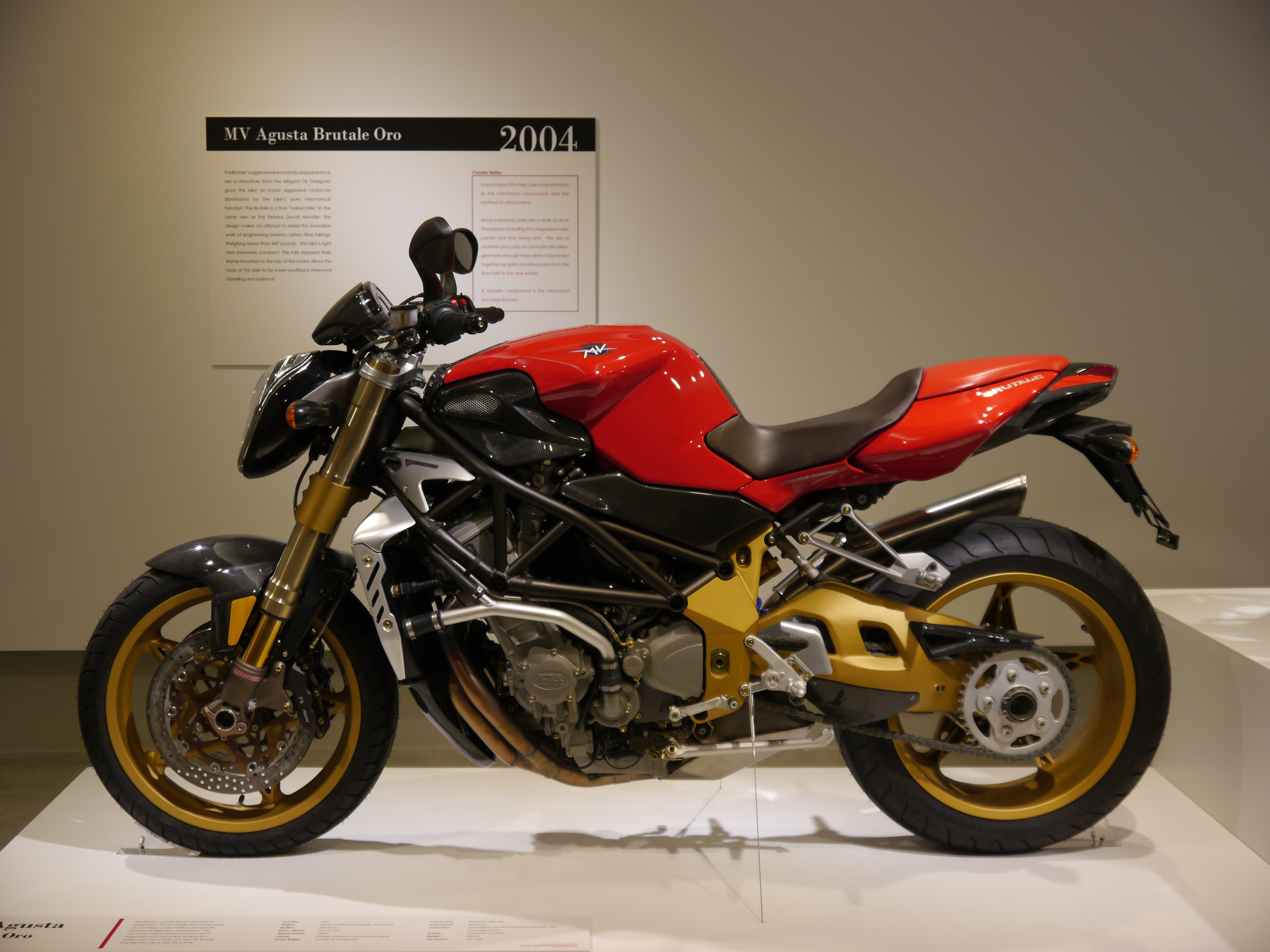
MV Agusta Brutale 750 Oro

As with other MV Agusta models, the first model of the series was a limited-edition, the Brutale 750 Oro. The model used magnesium parts, including the swing arm, finished in gold to save 6 kg. Finish was in traditional MV red, with a tobacco coloured leather seat. Each of the 300 machines came with a certificate of authenticity and a numbered gold plate placed onto the steering head.

==== Brutale 750 S ====
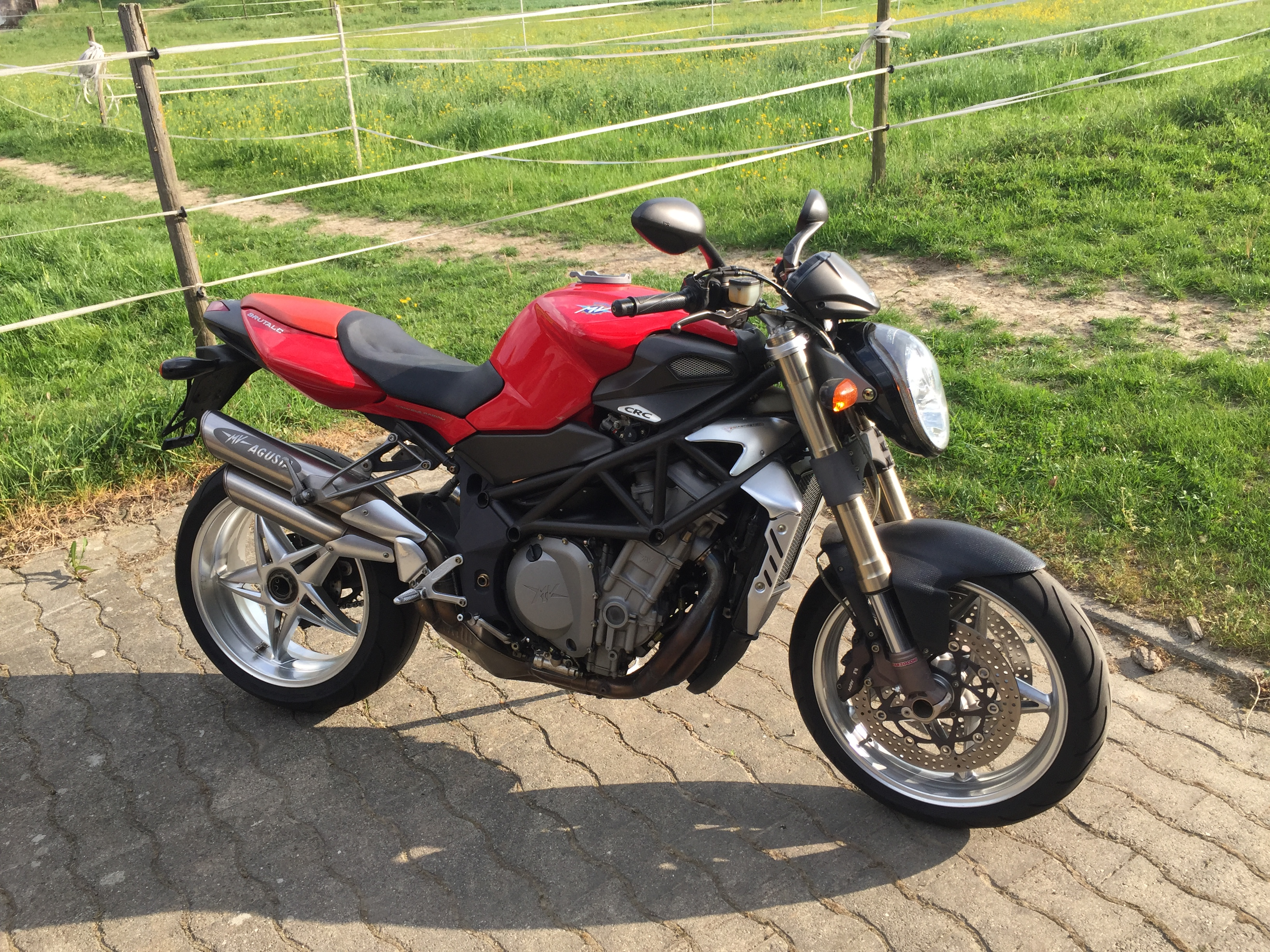
MV Agusta Brutale 750 S

Introduced in 2002, the Brutale 750 S was the first full production Brutale model. Similar to the Oro model, aluminium parts replaced the magnesium items used on the Oro. 49 mm Showa front forks were used along with the silver aluminium wheels from the F4 750 S Evo 03. A black faux leather seat was fitted and the machine was available in red or opaque black livery.

==== Brutale America ====
The Brutale America was an upgrade kit for the 750 S, inspired by the livery of the classic MV Agustas of the 1970s, such as the MV Agusta 750 S. The kit was available as a basic kit consisting of a red/white/blue painted fuel tank, blue tail section panels, and alcantara seats. A "full option" kit was also available that added carbon fibre body part and silver Marchesini ten-spoke forged aluminium wheels. Both kits were limited to 300 units and came with a certificate of authenticity and a numbered plate.

==== Brutale CRC ====
The Brutale CRC was an upgrade kit for the 750 S. The kit was available as a basic kit consisting of silver/blue painted fuel tank and tail section panels, and alcantara seats. The livery was similar to the F4 SP-01 Viper kit. A "full option" kit was also available that added carbon fibre body part and silver Marchesini ten-spoke forged aluminium wheels. Both kits were limited to 300 units and came with a certificate of authenticity and a numbered plate.

==== Brutale Mamba ====
Introduced in 2006, the Brutale Mamba was an upgrade kit for the 750 S. The kit consisted of a titanium exhaust system and carbon fibre body parts. Livery was the same red and black as the F4 1000 Mamba. Production was limited to 300 units and came with a certificate of authenticity and a numbered plate.

==== Brutale Gladio ====
A second upgrade kit was introduced in 2006, the Brutale Gladio. The kit was available as a basic kit consisting of metallized black/grey painted fuel tank, front mudguard and side panels. Also included was a leather seat and an MV Corse alarm. A "full option" kit was also available that added carbon fibre body part and silver forged aluminium wheels. Both kits were limited to 300 units and came with a certificate of authenticity and a numbered plate.

==== Brutale 910 S ====
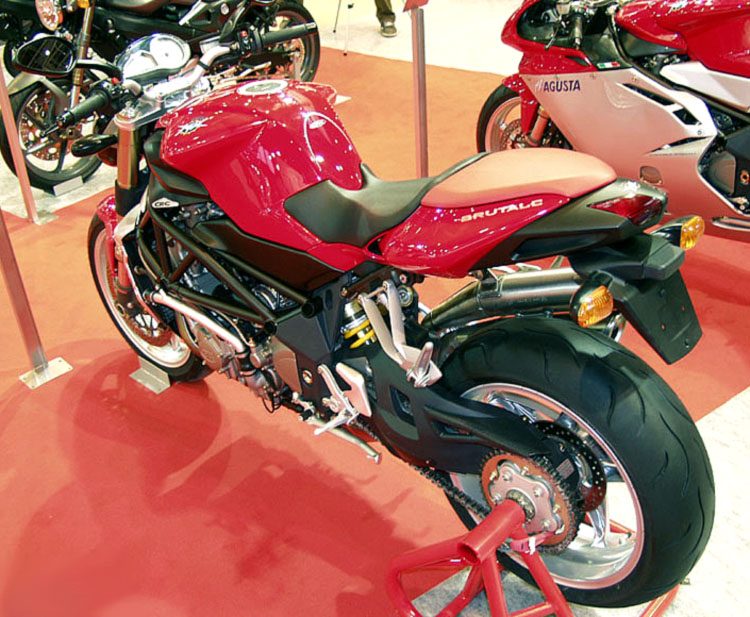
2006 MV Agusta Brutale 910 S

Introduced in late 2005, the Brutale 910 S was the first "big-bore" Brutale. The 909 cc engine was derived from the 750 cc unit, the 998 cc engine from the F4 100S being too tall to fit into the Brutale's frame. The new engine produced 136 bhp (101 kW) @ 11,000 rpm.

The frame was unchanged from the 750 models. Fully adjustable 50mm Marzocchi forks and a remote-reservoir single rear shock were fitted. Brakes were by Nissin, six-pot on front and four-pot on the rear.

The machine was available in red tank/Grey frame; silver tank/red frame or orange tank/black frame and featured a "910" logo on the tank.

==== Brutale 910 R ====
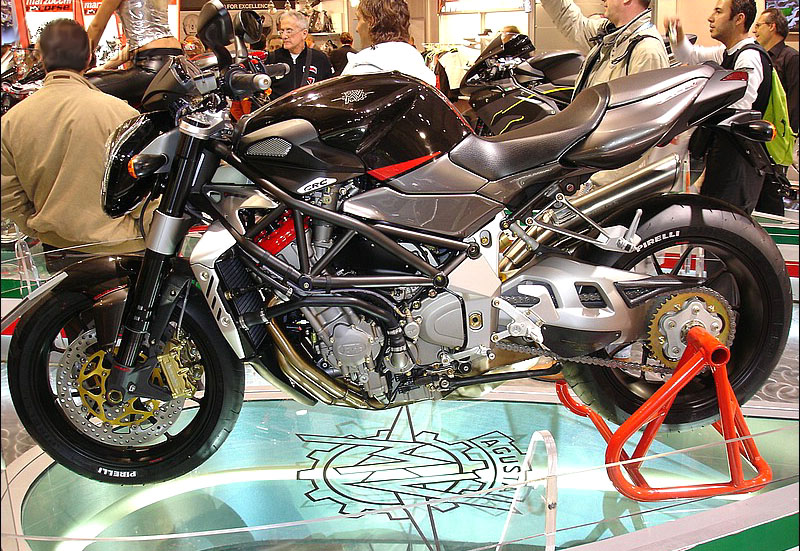
2006 MV Agusta Brutale 910 R

Premiered at the 2005 Milan EICMA show, where it won a best of show award, the Brutale 910 R was a higher performance version of the 910 S. The engine had polished inlet ports and a specialised eprom, and with the optional racing exhaust produced 144 bhp.

Marzocchi USD 50 mm R.A.C. (Road Advanced Component) forks were used, this was the first time they had been used on a road bike. A fully adjustable Sachs single shock absorber was fitted at the rear. A new Brembo front brake system featuring radial P4/34 calipers that featured the Brutale logo were introduced. A titanium coating was applied to the lower steering flange, forks, frame plates and handlebar counterweights. The bike was finished in a black/anthracite livery with red graphics and valve covers.

==== Brutale 910 R Italia ====
The Brutale 910 R Italia was a commemorative model produced to celebrate the Italy national football team winning the 2006 World Cup. Finished in the colours of the national football team, one machine was awarded to each team member the production number being the same number as on his shirt. A picture of the world cup was on the tank with the words "Campioni del Mondo 2006," (World Champions 2006) below it. Only 124 were produced, including the 24 awarded bikes.

==== Brutale 910R Hydrogen ====
The Brutale 910R Hydrogen was created as a collaboration between MV Agusta and the Italian clothing brand Hydrogen and introduced at the end of 2007. The machine featured a black engine and the white/green/red/black corporate colours of the Hydrogen brand. It had the same specifications as a standard 910R. Production of the Brutale 910R Hydrogen was limited to 100 units.

==== Brutale 910R Wally ====
The 2008 Brutale 910R Wally was designed in collaboration with the luxury boat manufacturer Wally Yachts. Production was limited to 118 numbered copies, which is the length in feet of the iconic boat, the 118 WallyPower. Based on the Brutale 910 R, the machine features unique graphics and livery.

==== Brutale 910R Starfighter ====
The limited edition Brutale 910R Starfighter was based on the Brutale 910 R and fitted with carbon fibre bodywork and a custom livery. Production was limited to 99 numbered copies.

==== Brutale 910R Starfighter Titanium ====
The production of the Brutale 910R Starfighter Titanium was limited to 23 numbered copies. The specifications are the same as for a regular Starfighter 910R, but it features titanium manifolds, link pipe and exhausts and carbon fibre parts.

==== Brutale 1078 RR ====
First shown at the 2007 Milan EICMA show, the Brutale 1078 RR won the "Most Beautiful Motorcycle" award. Featuring a 154 bhp (115 kW) version of the 1,078 cc engine from the F4 RR 312, the model was the fastest and top of the range Brutale. Revised 50 mm Marzocchi forks were fitted and racing Brembo monoblock were used. The new forged aluminium five-spoke star-shaped wheels were also from Brembo.

The machine was available in pearl white/gloss black, racing red/silver or black/anthracite grey livery.

==== Brutale 1078 RR Jean Richard ====
MV Agusta partnered with watchmaker Jean Richard in 2008. MV produced the limited-edition Brutale 1078 RR Jean Richard, which was a 1078 RR finished in Jean Richard livery and logos. Jean Richard produced a limited-edition Brutale watch.

==== Brutale 989 R ====
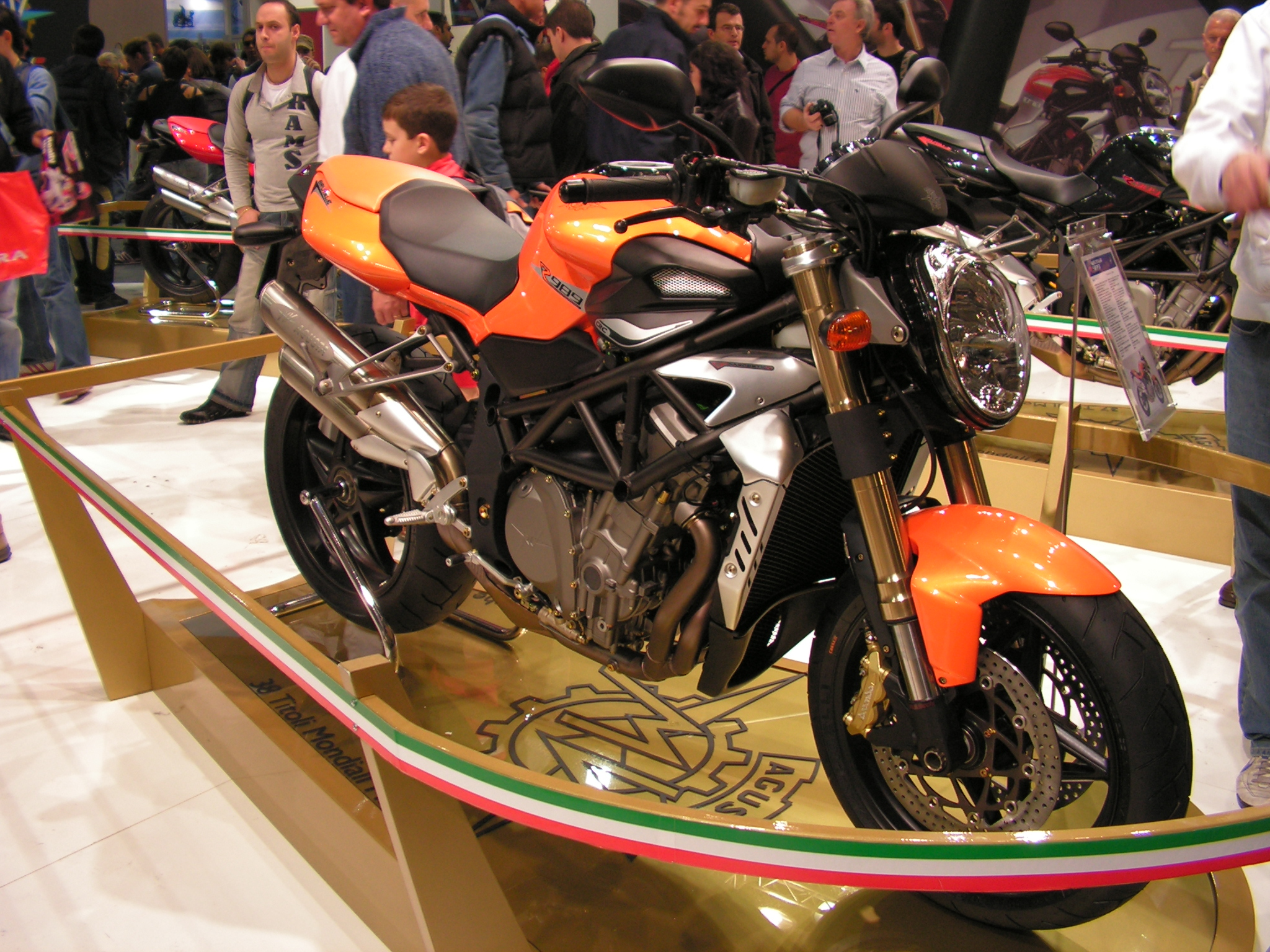
MV Agusta Brutale 989 R at the 2007 EICMA in Milan

Introduced in 2008, the Brutale 989 R used a 982 cc engine which was produced by over-boring the 910 cc engine of previous models. The engine produced 142 bhp (106 kW). The 50mm Marzocchi forks had been revised and provided an extra 4 mm of travel. A fully adjustable Sachs rear shock and Brembo four-piston radial brake calipers were fitted.

=== Second generation ===
==== Brutale 990 R ====
Following the brand coming under the ownership of Harley Davidson, a redesigned Brutale was introduced in late 2009. The Brutale 990 R model was powered by a new variant of the 4-cylinder engine. Using the crankshaft of the 1078 models and a smaller bore, the 998 cc engine was of a longer stroke than previous models. It featured a balance shaft to reduce vibration. Power output was 139 bhp (104 kW).

The frame on the new models was more compact and the swinging arm longer. Redesigned 50 mm Marzocchi forks were fitted, the new design being exclusive to MV Agusta. Front brakes used 4-pot calipers from Brembo, and discs from NHK. Innovative gravity die-cast wheels were fitted.

85% of the components on this model were redesigned. It was available in red/silver or black/silver livery.

==== Brutale 1090 RR ====
The top of the range Brutale 1090 RR was fitted with a 1078 cc engine. Apart from the engine, other changes from the base 990 R model include a slipper clutch, steering damper, cast wheels, updated rear shock and Brembo racing brakes.

The model was available in a pearl white/black or red/silver finish, both with red valve covers.

From 2013, the model was available with ABS and designated the Brutale 1090 RR ABS.

==== Brutale 1090 RR Cannonball ====
The Brutale 1090 RR Cannonball was a track only upgrade kit for the 1090 RR. A modified ECU, cylinder head, camshafts, valves and titanium exhaust system increase power output to 165 bhp (123 kW). The kit also included carbon fibre bodywork.

==== Brutale 990 R Brand Milano ====
Following the 2010 Milan EICMA show, a one-off Brutale 990 R, dubbed the Brutale 990 R Brand Milano, was presented to the city of Milan. The machine's graphics show the city skyline with the Duomo, Castello Sforzesco and the Teatro alla Scala featured.

==== Brutale 990 R LE 150th Anniversary ====
In late 2010, the Brutale 990 R LE 150th Anniversary was introduced to celebrate the 150th anniversary of the Italian unification. Based on the Brutale 990 R, this model was a single seater and was equipped with a spoiler. Available in red, white or black, all 3 featuring the red, white and green colours of the Italian flag. Production was limited to 150 units.

==== Brutale 920 ====
The Brutale 920 was introduced in 2011 as an entry level Brutale. Powered by a new 921 cc variant of the four-cylinder engine, the new displacement was achieved by a reduction of bore, the crankshaft being the same as the 990 and 1090 models. Power output was 129 bhp (96 KW) @ 10,500 rpm.

==== Brutale 1090 RR Corse ====
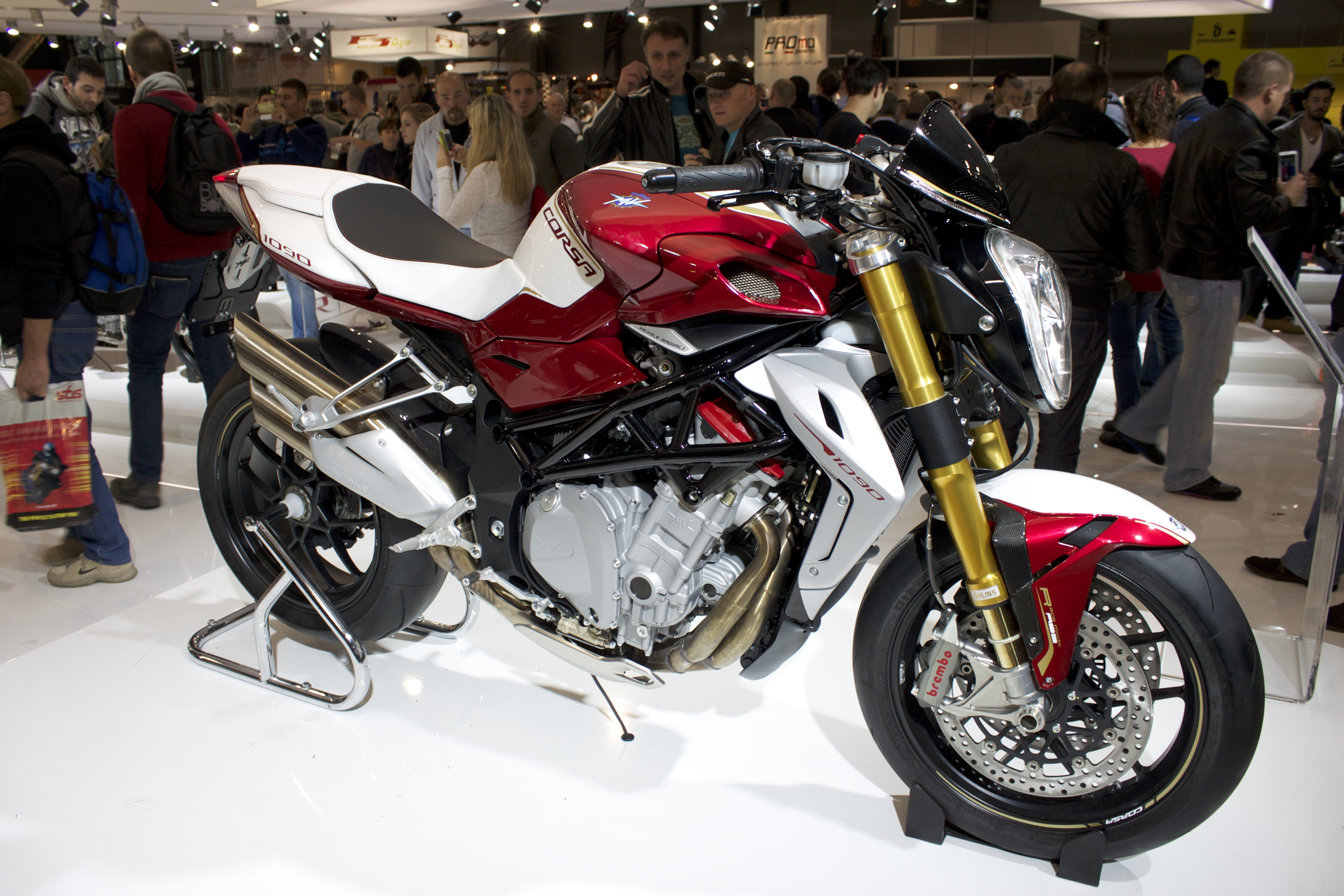
MV Agusta Brutale 1090 RR Corse

In 2013, the limited edition Brutale 1090 RR Corse was announced. Engine power had been increased to 158 bhp (118 kW). Ohlins Nix 43mm forks were fitted, along with forged wheels. Bodywork featured carbon fibre passenger seat cover, front mudguard and rear wheel hugger.

The machine was finished in ruby metallic red/pearl white with a black frame.

=== Third generation ===
==== Brutale 675 ====
Based on the MV Agusta F3, the Brutale 675 was first introduced at the 2011 Milan EICMA show. The counter-rotating (reverse) crankshaft three-cylinder 108 bhp (81 kW) engine produced slightly less power than the F3 engine, but had more torque available at lower revs.

As the triple engine was more compact than the four, the frame could be made more compact and the swinging arm lengthened compared to previous models. 43 mm Marzocchi upside-down forks, Sachs rear shock absorber and Brembo brakes from the F3 were fitted.

The machine was available in pearl white/matte metallic gold, red/silver or matte magno grey/matte anthracite finish.

==== Brutale 800 ====
Introduced in 2013, the Brutale 800 was the second of the triple-cylinder engined models. The engine was derived from the 798 cc F3 800 unit and produced 125 bhp (93 kW).

In 2014, the model was available with ABS as the Brutale 800 ABS.

==== Brutale Dragster 800 ====
Introduced in 2014, the Brutale Dragster 800 was a "street fighter" model, based on the Brutale 800 model. Amongst the styling changes was the fitting of a 200/50 x 17 Pirelli rear tyre. The machine was available with white or matt metallic grey paintwork.

The model was later split off into its own Dragster model series.

==== Brutale 800 RR ====
Producing an extra 15 bhp, the Brutale 800 RR was launched in 2015 as the fastest Brutale triple. 50mm throttle bodies, new airbox, two fuel injectors per cylinder and a less restrictive exhaust brought the power up to 140 bhp (100 kW). Updated 43 mm diameter Marzocchi upside-down forks with a DLC (Diamond Like Carbon) coating to reduce wear and an "aged gold" finish, ABS and racing brakes were fitted. The bike was finished in pearl shock red/pearl ice white or metallic aviation grey/metallic carbon black livery.

The model was updated for 2018, with engine mods giving a broader range of power. The transmission was upgraded and a new EAS 2.0 quickshifter fitted. The machine gained lighter wheels and pearl shock red/metallic carbon black or pearl ice white/metallic carbon black liveries were offered.

==== Brutale 800 RR SCS ====
The Brutale 800 RR was further enhanced for 2020 with the addition of the SCS 2.0 Smart Clutch System and designated the Brutale 800 RR SCS. The SCS 2.0 system, which was first fitted on the Turismo Veloce in 2018, allows the rider to use the clutch in a conventional manner with the lever, or simply allow the system to control the clutch. The system is based on the Rekluse clutch, which allows the rider to engage gear at tickover without using the clutch. Once the throttle is opened the clutch engages. The MV system adds electronic control, which optimises clutch engagement based on engine revs and throttle position, during up and down-shifts. The SCS system weighs just 36g more than a conventional clutch.

==== Brutale 800 RC ====
The limited-edition Brutale 800 RC (Reparto Corse) was introduced in 2018 as the most race focused model of the series. The titanium and carbon fibre SC-Project exhaust boosts power output to 150 bhp (110 kW) @ 12,800 rpm. Much of the bodywork is in carbon fibre and the forged, red-painted wheels from the F4 RC are fitted. As with other RC models, paintwork is red and white with technical sponsors’ logos. Production is limited to 350 units and numbered on the digital instrument cover.

==== Brutale 800 RR LH44 ====
Born from the collaboration with Formula 1 champion Lewis Hamilton, the Brutale 800 RR LH44 uses the technical platform of the 800 RR. Produced in a limited series of only 144 units, it features Hamilton's number "44", which he ran victoriously on in Formula 1.

==== Brutale 800 RR Pirelli ====
Introduced in 2019, the Brutale 800 RR Pirelli is a limited-edition model produced in collaboration with Pirelli and based on the 800 RR. The machine is fitted with the wheels and wider rear tyre from the F4. The headlight profile has been reshaped and a retractable passenger grab rail fitted. Livery is red and matt black or blue and nardo grey.

==== Brutale 800 Rosso ====
Introduced in late 2019, the Brutale 800 Rosso is part of MV's entry-level Rosso collection. The model is fitted with plain finish wheels rather than the milled finish of the other Brutale models, and no underbelly protector is fitted. The engine has been detuned and produces 110 bhp. Finish is a distinctive red and black.

==== Brutale 1000 Serie Oro ====
Unveiled at the 2018 Milan EICMA show, where it won "The most beautiful motorcycle of the show", the Brutale 1000 Serie Oro is claimed to be the fastest production naked motorcycle. Powered by an updated version of the 998 cc 4-cylinder engine, which produces 208 bhp (155 kW) @ 13,450 rpm, or 212 bhp (158 kW) with the optional Arrow exhaust and dedicated ECU fitted.

The machine has a full electronics suite, including the Ohlins suspension, with the shock absorber and steering damper being controlled by a dedicated ECU, and the Brembo Stylema brakes which use a Bosch 9.1 ABS system. Carbon fibre is used extensively for the bodywork and wheel rims.

Finished in fire red with gold plated swinging arm mounts, fork legs and bottom yoke, production is limited to 300 units.

==== Brutale 1000 RR ====
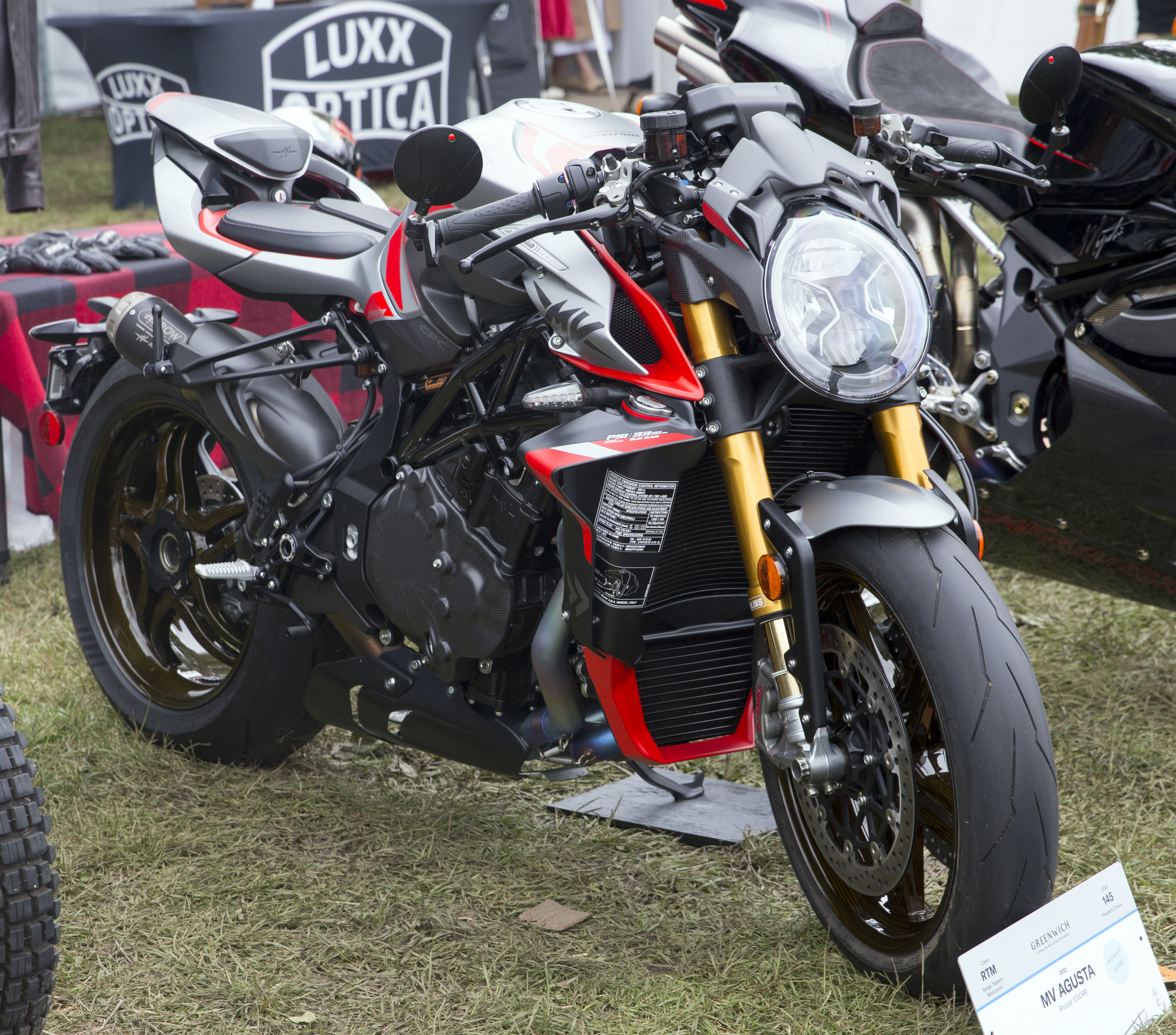
MV Agusta Brutale 1000 RR Nürburgring (special edition; limited to 150 examples)

It's the world's fastest Hyper-Naked bike by top speed. Designed as a production version of the Brutale 1000 Serie Oro, the Brutale 1000 RR was introduced at the 2019 EICMA show. Steel nuts and bolts are used where the Serie Oro used titanium. Wheels are forged aluminium. The machine is available in red and grey or yellow and grey finishes.

=== Brutale 1000 RS ===
Introduced in 2021, the Brutale 1000 RS was added to the range to provide "slightly more touring-oriented option" to the 1000 RR. Whilst retaining the RR's engine and frame, the RS uses different suspension, brakes and seating to provide a more comfortable ride over longer distances.
