= MV Agusta Turismo Veloce =

Italian sport touring motorcycle

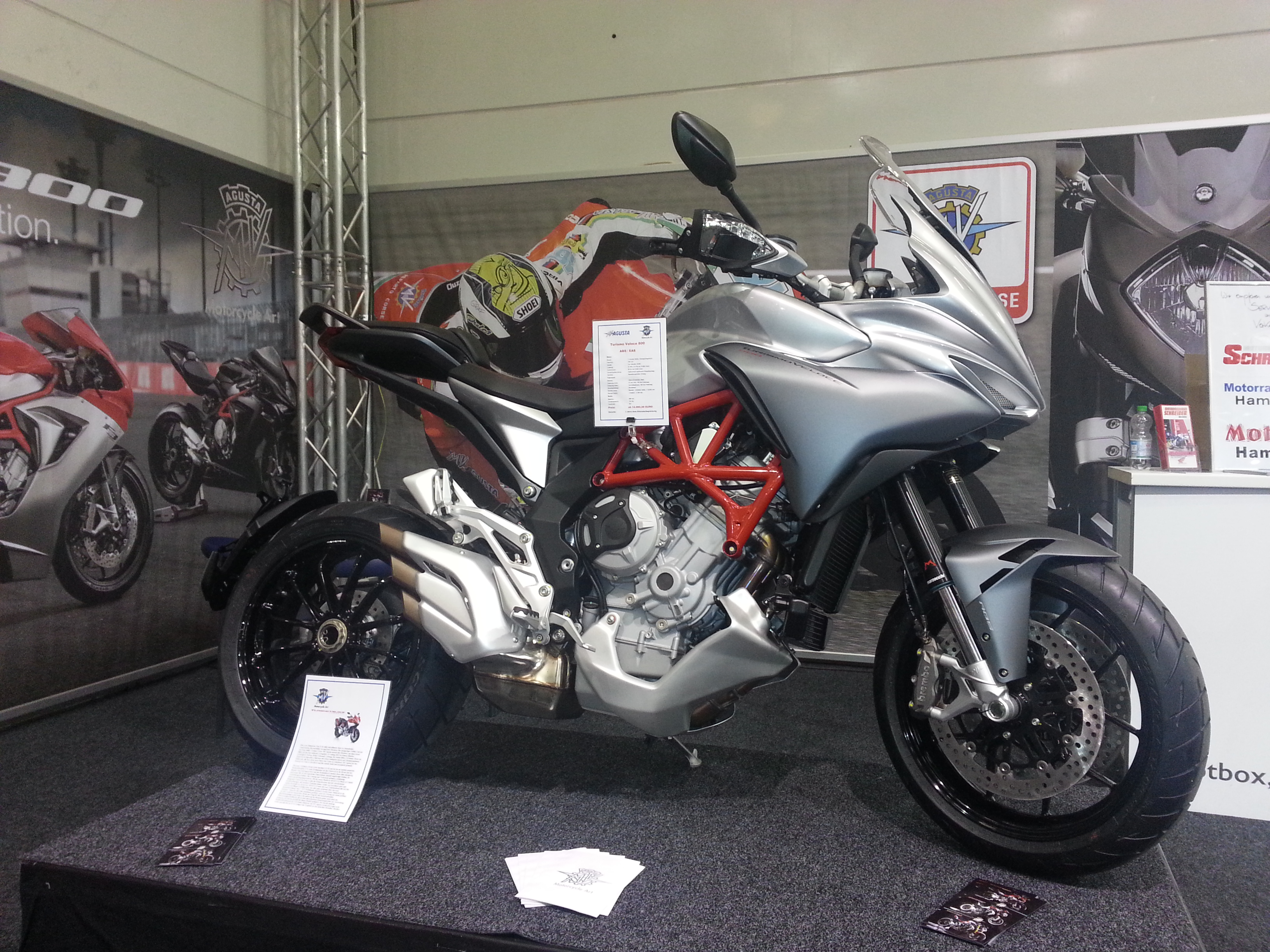
- 2015 MV Agusta Turismo Veloce
- Manufacturer: MV Agusta
- Also called: MV Agusta Turismo Veloce 800
- Production: 2015-
- Class: Sport touring
- Engine: 798 cc liquid cooled, three cylinder, 4 stroke, 12 valve, DOHC
- Bore / stroke: 79 mm x 54.3 mm
- Compression ratio: 12.2: 1
- Top speed: 140 mph (225 km/h)
- Power: 110 bhp (82 kW) @ 10,150 rpm
- Torque: 61 ft-lb (83 Nm) @ 8,000 rpm
- Transmission: Wet multi-plate slipper clutch, 6 gears, chain drive
- Frame type: Lattice
- Suspension: Front: Marzocchi telescopic forks Rear: Cast aluminium single-sided swingarm with single Sach shock absorber
- Brakes: Brembo disc brakes Front:Twin 320 mm, radial four-pot calipers Rear: Single 220 mm, twin pot caliper
- Tires: Front: 120/70 x 17; Rear: 190/55 x 17
- Wheelbase: 1460 mm
- Dimensions: L: 2084 mm W: 900 mm
- Seat height: 850 mm
- Weight: 191 kg (dry)
- Fuel capacity: 22 l

The MV Agusta Turismo Veloce is a motorcycle produced by the Italian motorcycle manufacturer MV Agusta. The machine premiered at the 2013 EICMA, but production was delayed due to the financial crisis being experienced by the manufacturer. The motorcycle was first made available to the press for road tests in April 2015.

== Overview ==
The Turismo Veloce (Italian for Fast Touring) is advertised as a "The Tourer With A Racing Spirit", being a sports bike built into touring bodywork. It is aimed at the same sport touring market as the Ducati Multistrada and Kawasaki Ninja 1000.

Originally designed by Ezio Mascheroni, the three cylinder, 4 stroke, 12 valve, DOHC engine is derived from unit in the MV Agusta F3 800. The engine has a counter rotating crankshaft, normally only found on GP machines, which counteracts the centripetal forces of the wheels allowing the bike to turn faster. The power output is 110 hp at 10,000 rpm, giving a maximum speed of 143 mph (230 km/h).

Standard features include ABS, cruise control, four driving modes and engine maps that cut the power delivered by the engine to better adapt the bike to driving and road conditions (Rain 80 bhp, Touring 90 bhp, Sport 110 bhp and "Custom", which is customisable by the rider, the MVCSC (MV Agusta Chassis Stability Control) and MVICS 2.0 (Motor & Vehicle Integrated Control System) and the six-speed electronic gearbox.

Initially, due to the continuing financial crisis of MV Agusta. production numbers were limited, with the Turismo Veloce and the Rivale only having 181 registrations combined in the first months of 2016.

== Model Variants ==
In addition to the standard Turismo Veloce, 3 variants have been produced.

=== Turismo Veloce Lusso ===
The Turismo Veloce Lusso (luxury) is an upmarket version of the Turismo Veloce. It is fitted with an LED headlamp, sat-nav, heated grips and hand guards. The bike is fitted with Sachs Skyhook electronic suspension, a semi-active system.

=== Turismo Veloce Lusso SCS ===
Introduced in 2018, the Turismo Veloce Lusso SCS adds the Smart Clutch System (SCS) to the Lusso, which allows electronic management to the clutch system. The rider can use the clutch in a conventional manner with the lever, or simply allow the system to control the clutch. The system is based on the Rekluse clutch, which allows the rider to engage gear at tickover without using the clutch. Once the throttle is opened the clutch engages. The MV system adds electronic control, which optimises clutch engagement based on engine revs and throttle position. This, combined with the traction and anti-wheelie controls, gives the bike a launch control, and 0-60 mph in 3.1 seconds is consistently achievable.

=== Turismo Veloce RC ===
The Turismo Veloce RC (Reparto Corse) was first shown at the 2016 EICMA Milan Show. This limited edition is of 250 machines. It features all the "extras" of the Lusso SCS and adds a carbon fiber front mudguard, forged aluminium racing wheels from the F4 and Reparto Corse graphics.

=== Turismo Veloce RC SCS ===
The Turismo Veloce RC RR was further enhanced for 2019 with the addition of the SCS 2.0 Smart Clutch System and a limited run of 250 Turismo Veloce RC SCS models produced. The SCS 2.0 system, which was first fitted on the Turismo Veloce 800 Lusso SCS in 2018, allows the rider to use the clutch in a conventional manner with the lever, or simply allow the system to control the clutch. The SCS system weighs just 36g more than a conventional clutch.

=== Turismo Veloce 800 Rosso ===
Introduced at the 2019 EICMA Milan Show, the Turismo Veloce 800 Rosso is part of MV's entry-level Rosso collection. Changes are minimal, the wheels are plain cast alloy rather than the milled finish of other models and no side-boxes are fitted. The machine is finished is a distinctive red and black livery.
