= Luigi Marchesi (disambiguation) =

Luigi Marchesi (1754–1829) was an Italian castrato singer. It may also refer to:

- Luigi Marchesi (painter) (1825–1862), Italian painter
- Luigi Marchesi (soldier) (1910–1997), officer in the Royal Italian Army
