= MV Agusta F3 series =

MV Agusta F3
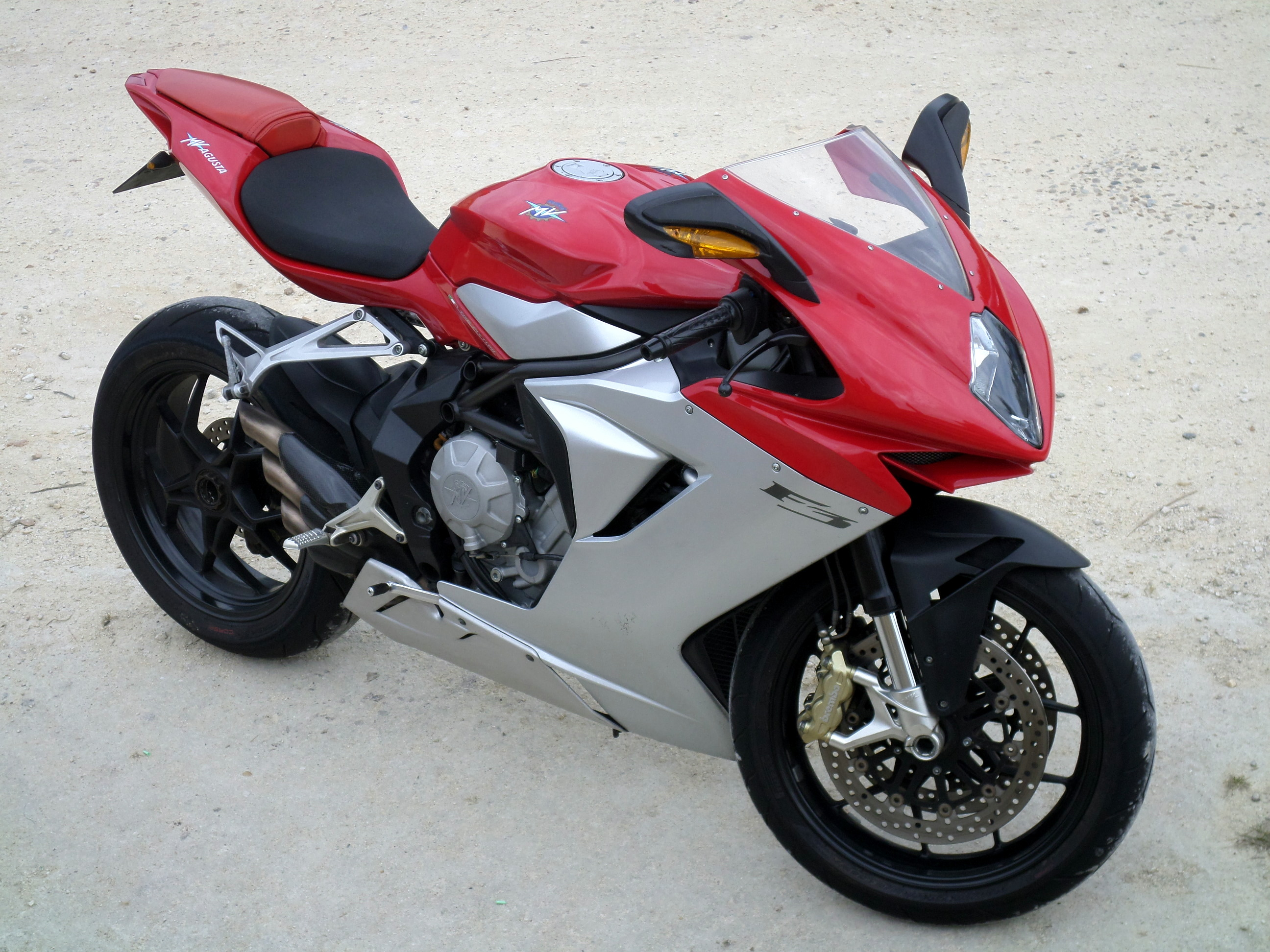
- MV Agusta F3
- Manufacturer: MV Agusta
- Production: 2012-
- Class: Sport bike
- Engine: 675–798.5 cc (41.19–48.73 cu in) liquid-cooled, DOHC, Three cylinder, 4 stroke, 12 valve, DOHC
- Bore / stroke: 79 mm × 45.9 mm (3.1 in × 1.8 in) (2012–2021); 79 mm × 54.3 mm (3.1 in × 2.1 in) (2013–present)
- Transmission: Wet multi-plate slipper clutch, 6 gears, chain drive
- Frame type: Lattice
- Suspension: Front: Telescopic forks Rear:Single-sided swingarm with single shock absorber
- Brakes: Disc brakes

The MV Agusta F3 is a series of motorcycles introduced in 2012 by the Italian manufacturer MV Agusta. These models are the first three-cylinder machines that MV Agusta have manufactured since the famous three-cylinder GP racers of the 1970s.

== Overview ==
The bike was designed by Adrian Morton and the engine designed by Ezio Mascheroni. It was first shown at the EICMA motorcycle show in Milan on 2 November 2010, and incorporates the lines of the MV Agusta F4, with the diamond headlamp, tapered seat shell and single-sided swinging arm offering a view of the rear rim. Unlike the F4, the exhausts are not positioned under the seat but open on the right side of the bike, just in front of the rear wheel.

The limited edition Oro (Gold) version went on sale in December 2011 and the standard model in January 2012. Since 2013, the F3 has been offered with two different engine sizes: 675 and 800 cc.

The F3 was developed in conjunction with the Brutale 3 cylinder, ushering in a new chassis and new engine, giving the brand a new lease of life on the commercial front. The engine of the F3 serves as the basis for the entire 3-cylinder range of the manufacturer: the Rivale, Stradale and Turismo Veloce "hypermotard" models.

== Technology ==
The 675 cc engine uses a three-cylinder layout, which has given many world titles to the Varese company, but has been enriched by modern technology, such as multi-map wire guidance, to optimise engine performance based on needs and rider's preferences and controlled through simple settings.

A counter-rotating (reverse) crankshaft is used, which had previously only been used on MotoGP motorcycles, such as the Yamaha YZR-M1, which counteracts the centripetal forces of the wheels allowing the bike to turn faster. The bore and stroke are 79 mm and 45.9 mm, which is an extremely short-stroke. In conjunction with titanium valves, this allows an extremely high speed engine speed. The engine develops 126 bhp at 14,400 rpm. Motor control is handled by the MV Agusta MVICS system, which includes ride-by-wire motor control. This includes four pre-set and one individually adjustable rider's setting (similar to the BMW system) as well as an adjustable traction control with eight levels,

The MV Agusta's usual short wheelbase, steep steering head angle (66°) and resulting short trail (99 mm), gives the machine very good handling combined with high stability. The steel tubular lattice frame with aluminum swinging arm support is relatively short and the single-sided swinging arm relatively long. The 43 mm Marzocchi upside-down forks are, like the rear Sachs shock absorber, are fully adjustable, as usual in this class. The cassette gearbox can be fitted with an automatic switchgear (MV Agusta EAS) for a surcharge.

Braking is provided by Brembo, with two 320 mm diameter discs at the front, with radial-mounted four-piston calipers, and a 220 mm diameter disc and a double-piston caliper at the rear. The wheels are made of aluminium.

An 800 cc version was introduced in 2013. To obtain the extra displacement the stroke was increased from 45.9 mm to 54.3 mm. The 800 develops 148 bhp at 13,000 rpm.

In 2021 the 800cc was revised to meet the Euro 5 emission standard. Friction within the engine was reduced which, along with other changes, allowed the engine to still produce 147 bhp (110 kW). The Rosso was the first model to use the engine, followed soon after by the F3 RR.

== Color variants ==
Every year, several colour variants of the F3 are offered, mostly the classic red/silver with a black frame, white with red frame and grey/black with red frame.

Colour Variants
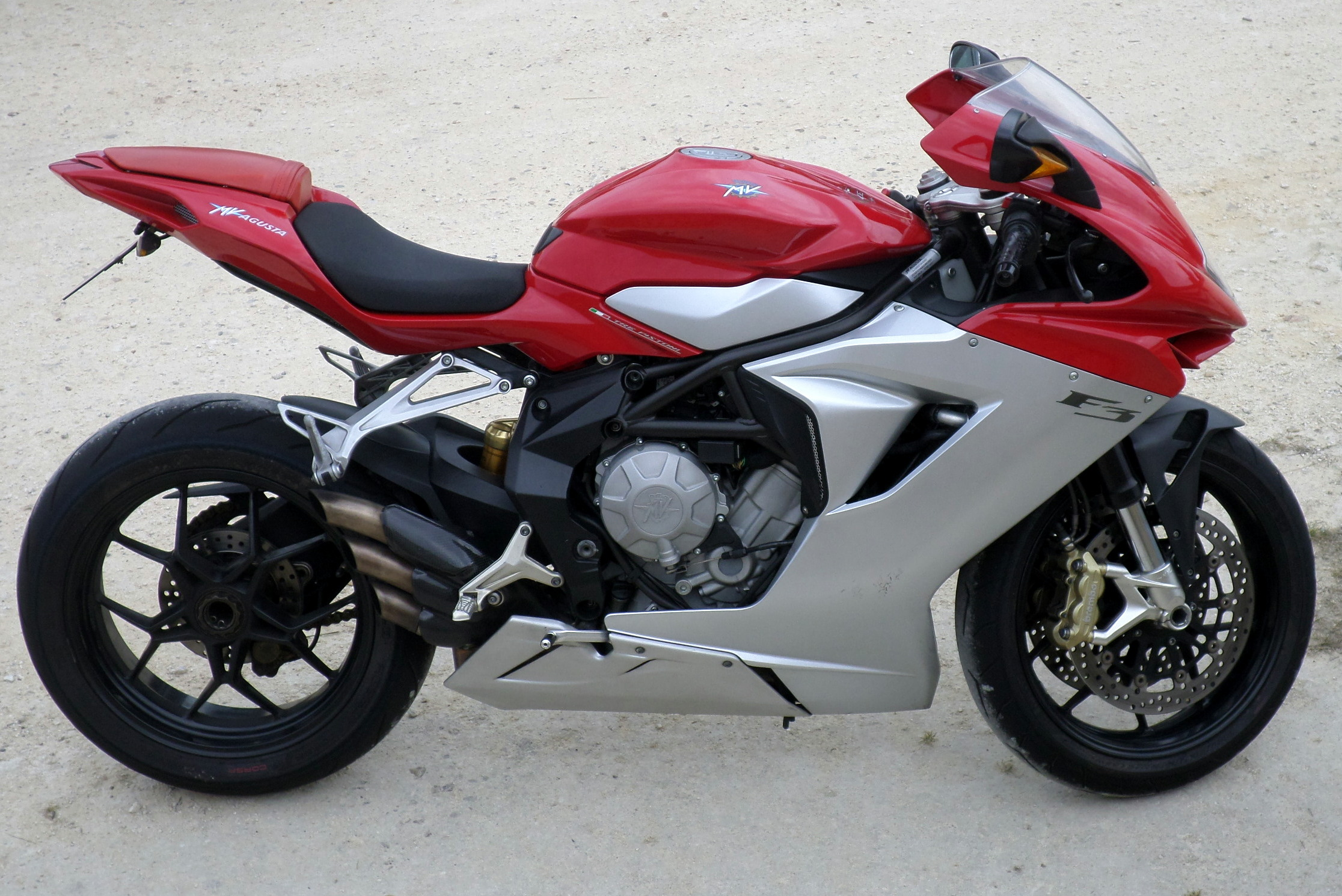
Red/silver F3 with a black frame

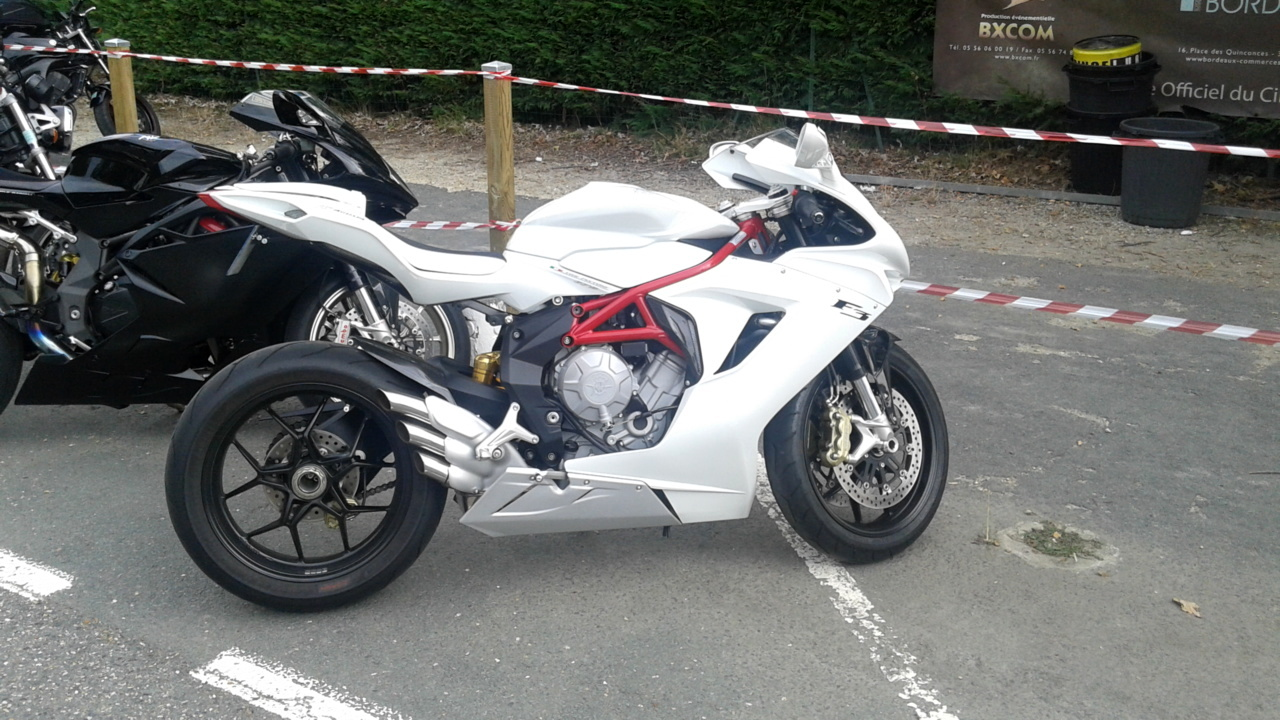
White F3 with red frame

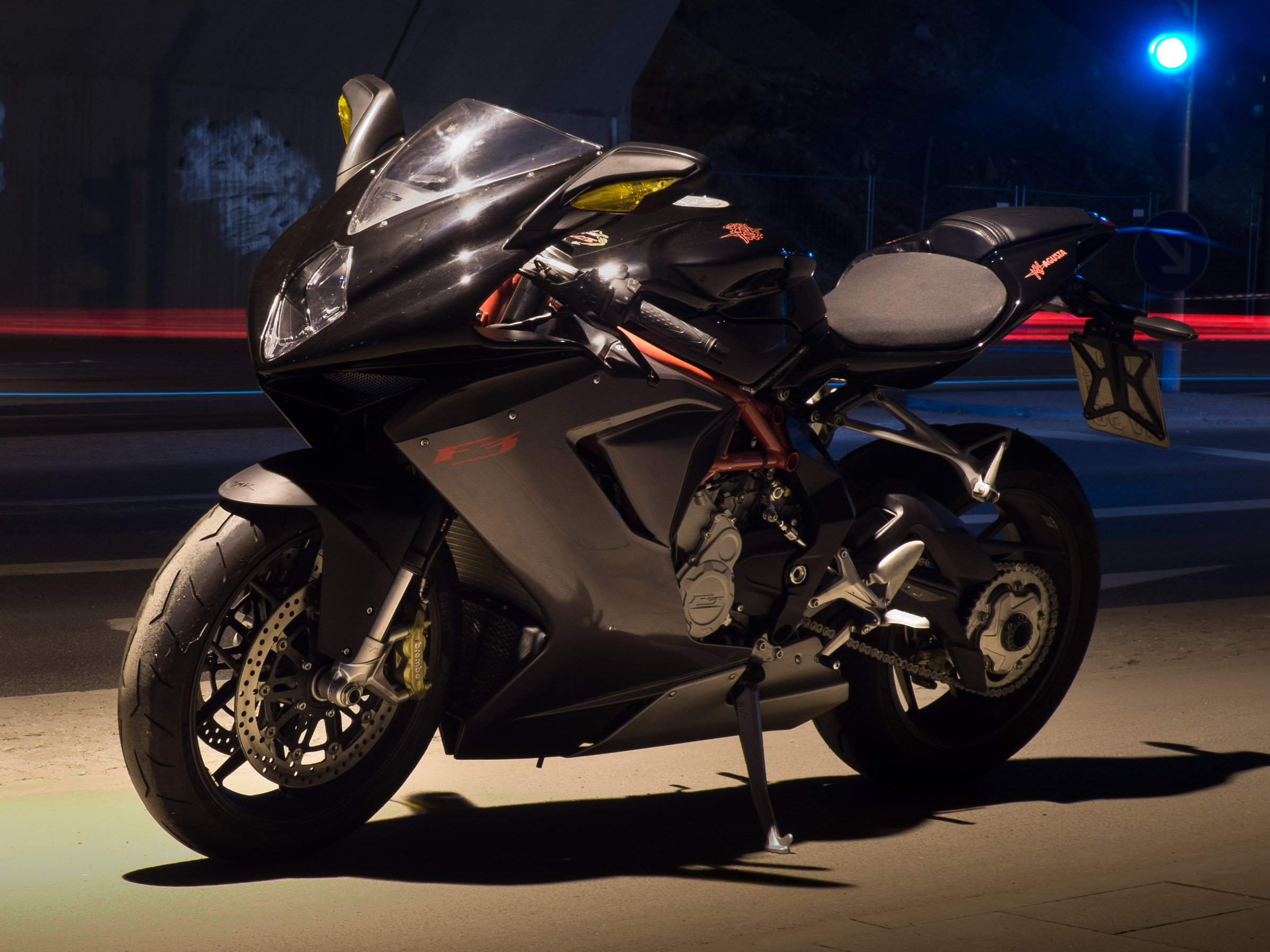
Grey/black F3 with red frame

== 675 cc Models ==
=== F3 675 ===
The "baseline" model of the series, introduced in 2012

=== F3 Serie Oro ===
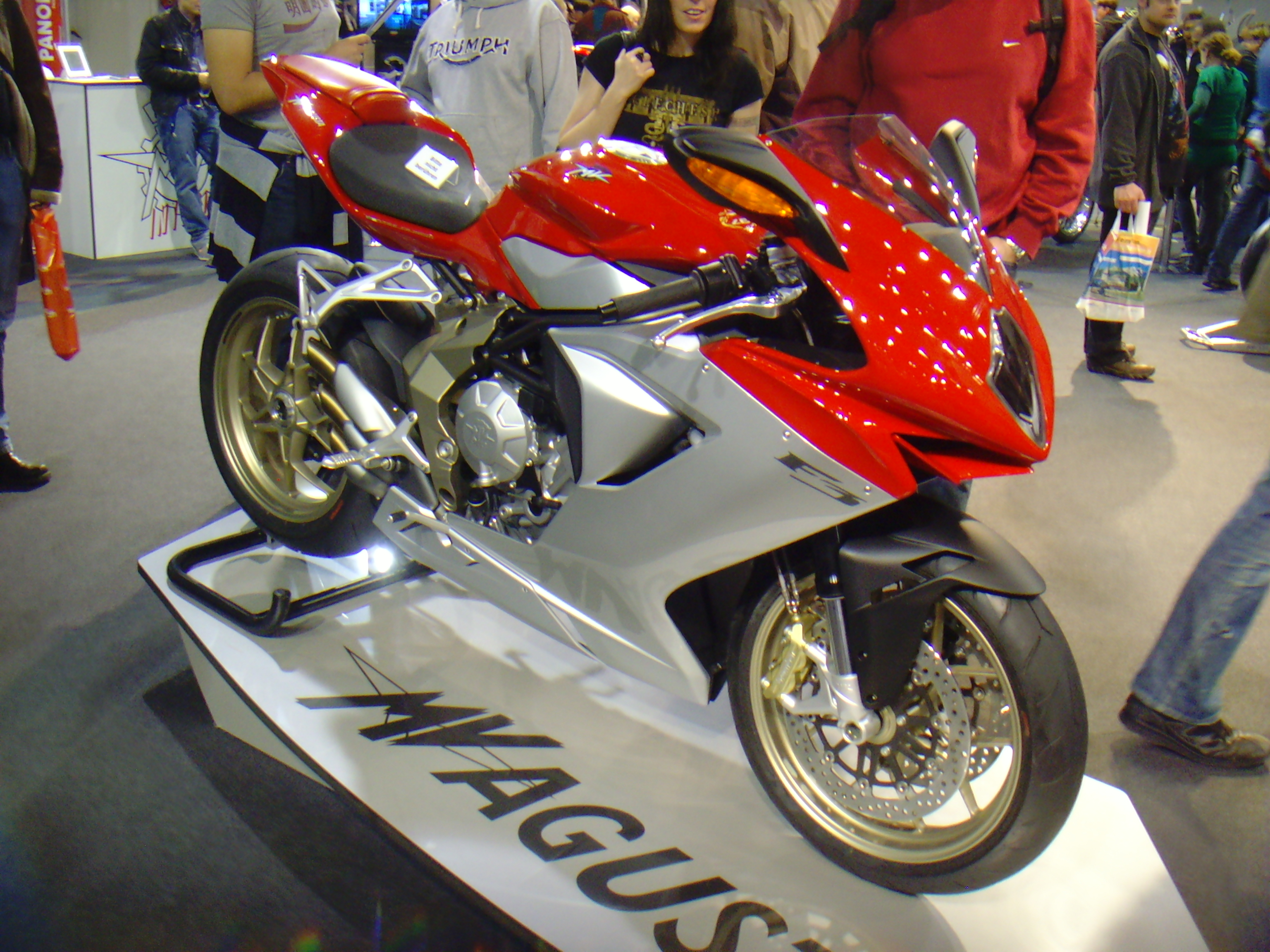
MV Agusta F3 Oro

A limited edition of 200 machines were produced to mark the launch of the new model series. The model has gold finished rear frame plates, swinging arms and wheels. Öhlins suspension, racing-spec Brembo brakes and carbon-fibre bodywork are fitted. The model comes with a certificate of authenticity and a gold badge on the top yoke engraved with the production number.

=== F3 675 RC ===
Introduced in 2018, the F3 675 RC (Reparto Corse) is a model inspired by the MV racers. It features an uprated engine (133 bhp) and chassis. A race-spec titanium exhaust system is fitted. Production is limited to 350 machines.

== 800 cc Models ==
=== F3 800 ===
Introduced in 2013, the F3 800 features the larger 800 cc engine, developing 148 bhp.

=== F3 800 AGO ===
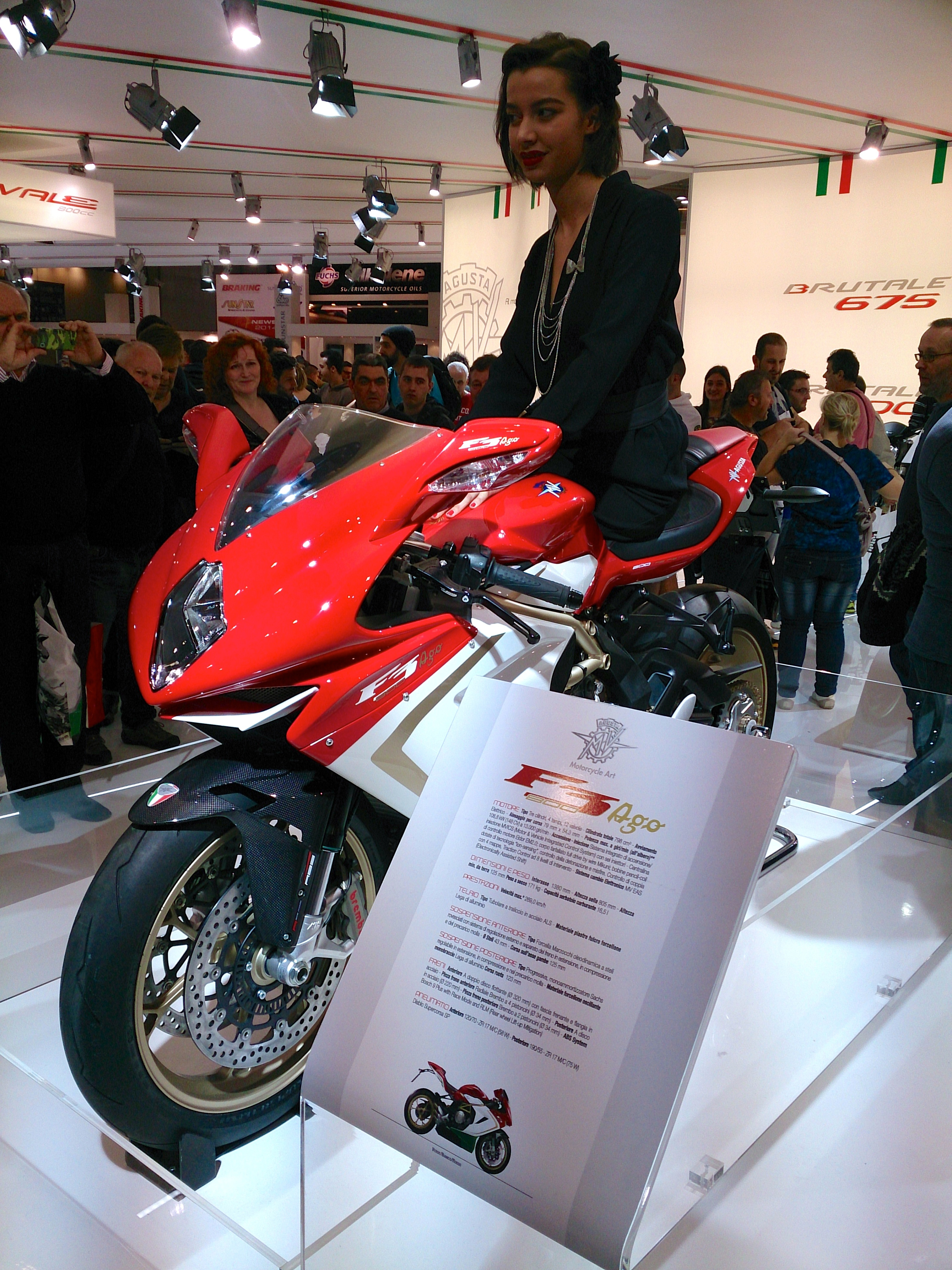
MV Agusta F3 800 AGO Special Edition

In 2014 a special version, the F3 800 AGO was introduced. It was dedicated to the former MV multiple world champion Giacomo Agostini. Production was limited to 300 units. It was equipped with lightweight components made of magnesium and carbon, bringing the weight down to 171 kg. The electronic management of the bike was integrated with the MVICS system (Motor & Vehicle Integrated Control System). The bikes were finished in red, white and green (Italian tricolor colours) and autographed by Agostini.

=== F3 800 RC ===
Like the smaller 675 RC, this 2018 350 units limited edition receives an updated engine, chassis and bodywork from the MV race shop. Power is increased to 153 bhp.

=== F3 XX ===
The track only F3 XX was announced in May 2019 by Reparto Corse. Engine output has been increased to 160 bhp (120 kW) @ 13,000 RPM, and weight has been reduced to 145 kilograms (320 lb) (dry). Extensive use is made of carbon fibre. Amongst the electronics suite is data logging to analyse lap times.

=== F3 Rosso ===
The F3 Rosso was introduced in 2021 as the new entry-level model using the Euro 5 compliant engine. It also had a revised frame that was stiffer than previous models and had revised steering geometry. Like other MV Rosso models, the machine was finished in red.

=== F3 RR ===
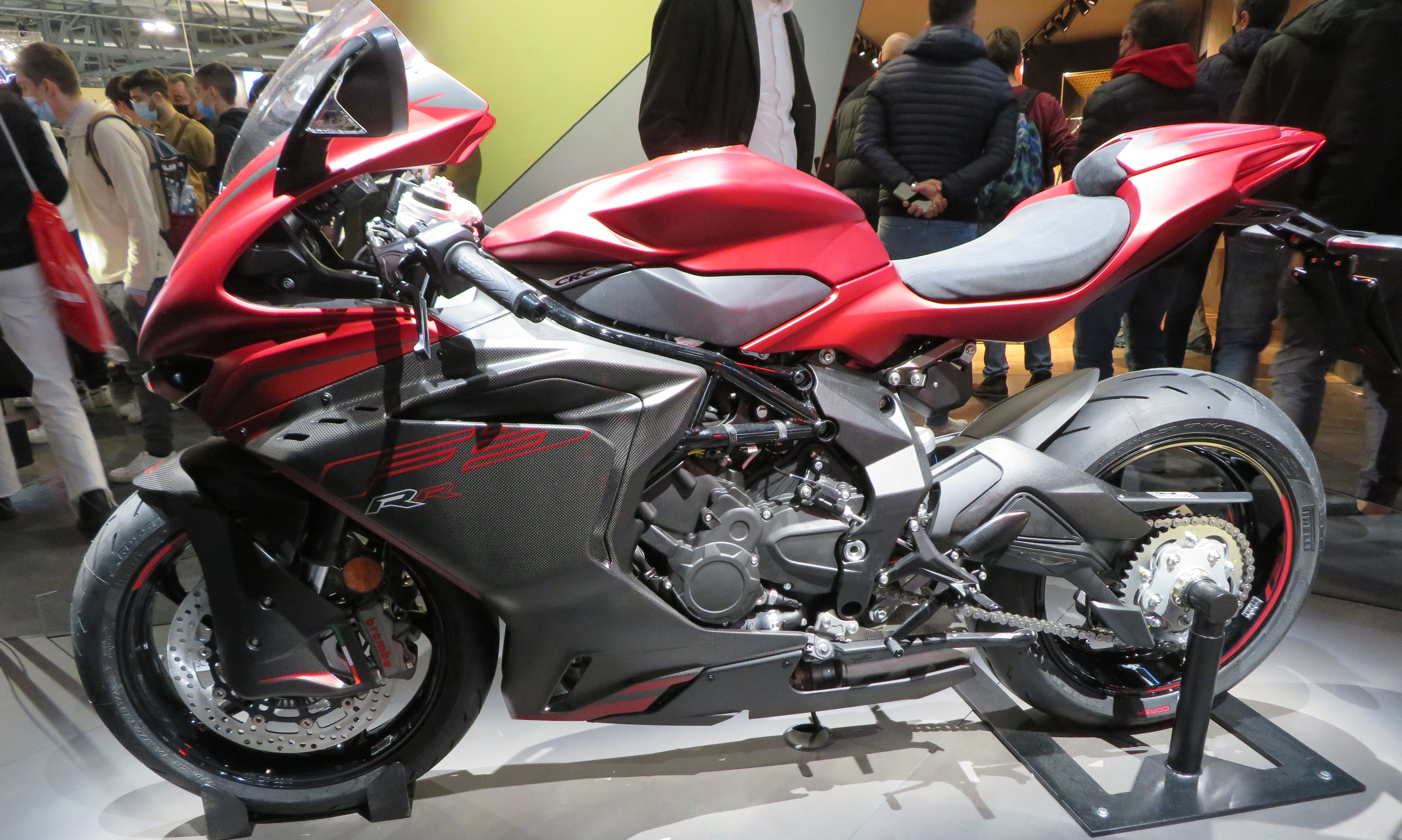
2021 MV Agusta F3 RR

Introduced in 2021, the F3 RR is the first high performance model using the Euro 5 engine. The aerodynamics were revised, including front winglets (called appendages by MV) that generate 8 kg (18 lb) downforce to the front wheel, while other improvements to the airflow around the bike negated the drag caused by the winglets. A race kit is available that raised the standard 147 to 155 bhp (110 to 116 kW) and reduced weight by 8 kg (18 lb).

=== F3 Competizione ===
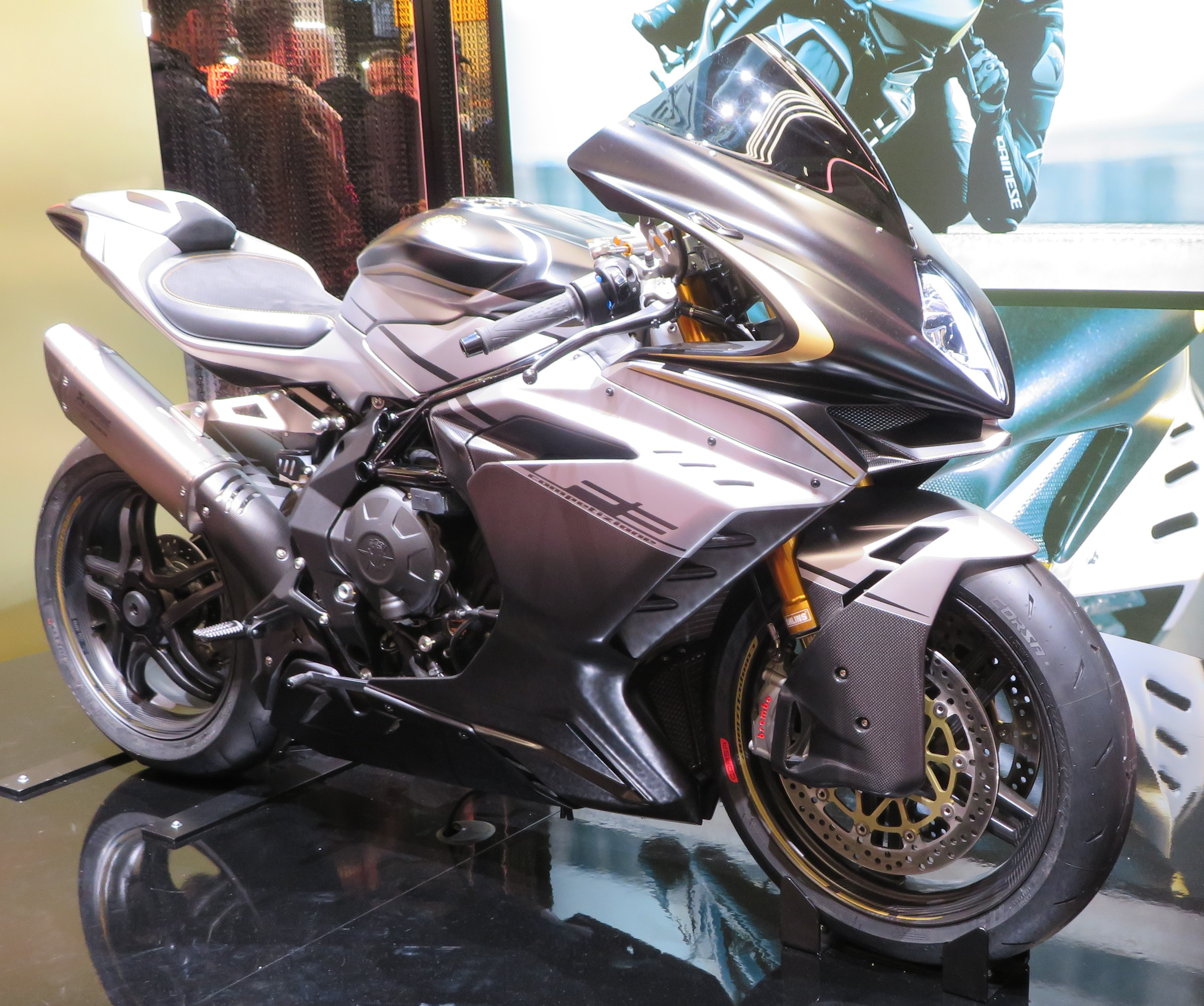
2025 MV Agusta F3 Competizione

In 2024, MV Agusta announced the 2025 F3 Competizione with a production run of 300 units. Featuring various upgrades, it produces 160 hp at 13,500 rpm with the race kit. The RR's Marzocchi and Sachs suspension has been swapped for Ohlins, reducing weight by 1 kg, whilst an adjustable Ohlins steering damper offers 19 firmness levels. BST carbon wheels replace the RR's aluminium units. With the full race kit, the Competizione is 14 kg lighter than the RR, or 7 kg lighter in stock form. In road trim, the motorcycle now passes the Euro5+ motorcycle emission standard.

== Racing ==
Two MV Agusta F3 675 competed in the 2013 Supersport World Championship season with bikes managed by Team ParkinGO; Roberto Rolfo and Christian Iddon rode the bikes achieving three podiums.

In 2014 MV Agusta made any official return to racing. Giovanni Castiglioni, chairman and President of MV Agusta, signed an agreement with Alexander Yakhnich, Chairman of Yakhnich Motorsport, to establish the new MV Agusta Reparto Corse for the 2014 season. The team was operated by Yakhnich Motorsport and competed in the Supersport and Superbike World Championships. In June 2014 Castiglioni and Yakhnich signed an agreement giving MV Agusta control over all operations concerning the racing team. Rider Jules Cluzel scored 3 wins for the team and finished 2nd in the championship this season. The ATK Racing Team also entered an F3 in 3 races of the 2014 Supersport World Championship, ridden by Alex Baldolini

Jules Cluzel and Lorenzo Zanetti rode for Reparto Corse in 2015, Cluzel winning 3 races. Alex Baldolini also rode an F3 entered by Race Department ATK#25. In Jerez, two other F3s were entered; Nicola Jr. Morrentino (Team Factory Vamag) and Miroslav Popov (GRT Racing Team).

In 2016, Cluzel and Zanetti were retained by Reparto Corse, Cluzel winning 2 races. Gino Rea and Aiden Wagner rode for the GRT Racing Team, Baldolini again rode for Race Department ATK#25 and Roberto Rolfo for Team Factory Vamag. Schmidt Racing entered Kyle Ryde and Nicolás Terol on MVs, but changed to Kawasaki Ninja ZX-6R machines part way through the season. Ilario Dionisi rode an F3 for Ellan Vannin Motorsport in Misano.

P. J. Jacobsen and Alessandro Zaccone rode for Reparto Corse in 2017. Davide Pizzoli joined Baldolini at Race Department ATK#25, but the team changed from F3s to the Yamaha YZF-R6 for the last races of the season. Rolfo remained at Team Factory Vamag but was replaced by Lorenzo Zanetti from Germany onwards.

MV Agusta Reparto Corse partnered with Team Vamag in late 2017 in preparation for the 2018 Supersport World Championship. The team was known as MV Agusta Reparto Corse by Vamag that season. Raffaele De Rosa and Ayrton Badovini were the two riders for the team. Davide Stirpe rode an F3 in two rounds for Extreme Racing Bardahl.

In 2019 Raffaele De Rosa was retained by Reparto Corse and joined by Federico Fuligni.

=== Supersport World Championship Results ===
Year	Team	No	Rider	1	2	3	4	5	6	7	8	9	10	11	12	13	14	15	Pos	Pts	Constructors	
Year	Team	No	Rider	1	2	3	4	5	6	7	8	9	10	11	12	13	14	15	Pos	Pts	Pos	Pts
2013	ParkinGO MV Agusta Corse	21	(United Kingdom) Christian Iddon	AUS; 21	ESP; Ret	NED; 11	ITA; 13	GBR; Ret	POR; 10	ITA; DNS	GBR; 5	GER; 12	TUR; Ret	FRA; 3	ESP; Ret				15th	45	4th	104
2013	ParkinGO MV Agusta Corse	47	(Italy) Roberto Rolfo	AUS; Ret	ESP; 9	NED; 6	ITA; 11	GBR; 3	POR; Ret	ITA; 14	GBR; 6	GER; 15	TUR; 5	FRA; Ret	ESP; 3				6th	7	4th	104
2014	MV Agusta RC–Yakhnich M. MV Agusta Reparto Corse	16	(France) Jules Cluzel	AUS; 1	ESP; Ret	NED; 3	**ITA**; 15	GBR; 2	**MAL**; 2	**ITA**; 1	POR; Ret	ESP; Ret	**FRA**; 1	**QAT**; 3					2nd	148	**3rd**	**162**
2014	MV Agusta RC–Yakhnich M. MV Agusta Reparto Corse	65	(Russia) Vladimir Leonov	AUS; Ret	ESP; 8	NED; 12	ITA; Ret	GBR; 15	MAL; 14	ITA	POR	ESP	FRA	QAT					19th	15 (19)	**3rd**	**162**
2014	MV Agusta RC–Yakhnich M. MV Agusta Reparto Corse	155	(Italy) Massimo Roccoli	AUS	ESP	NED	ITA	GBR	MAL	ITA; 14	POR; 10	ESP; Ret	FRA; 15	QAT; 10					20th	15	**3rd**	**162**
2014	ATK Racing	25	(Italy) Alex Baldolini	AUS	ESP	NED	ITA; Ret	GBR	MAL	ITA; 19	POR; Ret	ESP	FRA	QAT					-	0	**3rd**	**162**
2015	MV Agusta Reparto Corse	16	(France) Jules Cluzel	**AUS**; 1	THA; Ret	**ESP**; Ret	**NED**; 2	**ITA**; 2	GBR; 2	**POR**; 1	**ITA**; 1	MAL; 2	ESP; WD	FRA	QAT				4th	155	**3rd**	**218**
2015	MV Agusta Reparto Corse	87	(Italy) Lorenzo Zanetti	AUS; 2	THA; Ret	ESP; 5	NED; 6	ITA; 3	GBR; 4	POR; 5	ITA; 3	MAL; 3	ESP; 3	FRA; 4	QAT; 3				3rd	158	**3rd**	**218**
2015	MV Agusta Reparto Corse	88	(Spain) Nicolás Terol	AUS	THA	ESP	NED	ITA	GBR	POR	ITA	MAL	ESP; 5	FRA; 14	QAT; 6				18th	23	**3rd**	**218**
2015	Race Department ATK#25	25	(Italy) Alex Baldolini	AUS; 7	THA; 9	ESP; 6	NED; 9	ITA; Ret	GBR; Ret	POR; Ret	ITA; 5	MAL; 10	ESP; 7	FRA; Ret	QAT; 8				8th	67	**3rd**	**218**
2015	Team Factory Vamag	53	(Italy) Nicola Jr. Morrentino	AUS	THA	ESP	NED	ITA	GBR	POR	ITA	MAL	ESP; Ret	FRA	QAT				-	0	**3rd**	**218**
2015	GRT Racing Team	95	(Czech Republic) Miroslav Popov	AUS	THA	ESP	NED	ITA	GBR	POR	ITA	MAL	ESP; 18	FRA	QAT				-	0	**3rd**	**218**
2016	MV Agusta Reparto Corse	16	(France) Jules Cluzel	AUS; 17	**THA**; 1	ESP; 4	NED; 18	**ITA**; 2	MAL; 7	GBR; 8	ITA; Ret	GER; 3	FRA; 1	ESP; 6	QAT; 3				2nd	142	**3rd**	**203**
2016	MV Agusta Reparto Corse	52	(Italy) Massimo Roccoli	AUS	THA	ESP	NED	ITA	MAL	GBR	ITA	GER	FRA	ESP	QAT; 9				27th	7	**3rd**	**203**
2016	MV Agusta Reparto Corse	87	(Italy) Lorenzo Zanetti	AUS; Ret	THA; 8	ESP; Ret	NED; 29	ITA; DSQ	MAL; 13	GBR; 10	ITA; 5	GER; 7	FRA; 9	ESP	QAT				13th	44 (50)	**3rd**	**203**
2016	GRT Racing Team	4	(United Kingdom) Gino Rea	AUS; 7	THA; 9	ESP; Ret	NED; 2	ITA; Ret	MAL; 3	GBR; 4	ITA; 3	GER; Ret	FRA; Ret	ESP; WD	QAT				7th	81	**3rd**	**203**
2016	GRT Racing Team	41	(Australia) Aiden Wagner	AUS; 10	THA; 15	ESP; Ret	NED; DNQ	ITA; 17	MAL; 16	GBR; 19	ITA; 14	GER	FRA	ESP	QAT				26th	9	**3rd**	**203**
2016	GRT Racing Team	65	(Italy) Michael Canducci	AUS	THA	ESP	NED	ITA	MAL	GBR	ITA	GER; 23	FRA; Ret	ESP; 17	QAT; Ret				-	0	**3rd**	**203**
2016	GRT Racing Team	87	(Italy) Lorenzo Zanetti	AUS	THA	ESP	NED	ITA	MAL	GBR	ITA	GER	FRA	ESP; 10	QAT; Ret				13th	6 (50)	**3rd**	**203**
2016	Race Department ATK#25	25	(Italy) Alex Baldolini	AUS; 6	THA; 6	ESP; Ret	NED; 5	ITA; 4	MAL; 9	GBR; 7	ITA; 6	GER; 12	FRA; DNS	ESP	QAT; 10				8th	80	**3rd**	**203**
2016	Team Factory Vamag	44	(Italy) Roberto Rolfo	AUS; 9	THA; 18	ESP; Ret	NED; 22	ITA; 14	MAL; 12	GBR; 14	ITA; Ret	GER; 18	FRA; 16	ESP; Ret	QAT; Ret				24th	15	**3rd**	**203**
2016	Ellan Vannin Motorsport	57	(Italy) Ilario Dionisi	AUS	THA	ESP	NED	ITA	MAL	GBR	ITA; 17	GER	FRA	ESP	QAT				-	0	**3rd**	**203**
2016	Schmidt Racing	77	(United Kingdom) Kyle Ryde	AUS	THA	ESP	NED	ITA	MAL	GBR; 21	ITA; 22	GER	FRA	ESP	QAT				25th	0 (15)	**3rd**	**203**
2016	Schmidt Racing	88	(Spain) Nicolás Terol	AUS; 11	THA; Ret	ESP; 3	NED; 13	ITA; 9	MAL; Ret	GBR; Ret	ITA; 18	GER	FRA	ESP	QAT				17th	31	**3rd**	**203**
2017	MV Agusta Reparto Corse	61	(Italy) Alessandro Zaccone	AUS	THA	ESP; Ret	NED; 18	ITA; 10	GBR; Ret	ITA; 11	GER; 14	POR; Ret	FRA; Ret	ESP; 12	QAT				23rd	17	4th	145
2017	MV Agusta Reparto Corse	99	(United States) P. J. Jacobsen	**AUS**; 6	THA; Ret	**ESP**; 3	NED; 4	**ITA**; 3	GBR; Ret	ITA; 4	GER; Ret	POR; 5	FRA; 3	ESP; 4	QAT; Ret				6th	108	4th	145
2017	Race Department ATK#25	7	(Italy) Davide Pizzoli	AUS; Ret	THA; 14	ESP; DNS	NED; Ret	ITA; Ret	GBR	ITA	GER	POR	FRA	ESP	QAT				37th	2	4th	145
2017	Race Department ATK#25	25	(Italy) Alex Baldolini	AUS; 13	THA; DNS	ESP	NED	ITA; Ret	GBR; 16	ITA; DNS	GER; Ret	POR; DNS	FRA	ESP	QAT				31st	3 (8)	4th	145
2017	Race Department ATK#25	69	(Andorra) Xavier Cardelús	AUS	THA	ESP; 13	NED	ITA	GBR; Ret	ITA	GER; DNS	POR	FRA	ESP	QAT				36th	3 (5)	4th	145
2017	Team Factory Vamag	44	(Italy) Roberto Rolfo	AUS; 1	THA; 11	ESP; 6	NED; 15	ITA; Ret	GBR; 14	ITA; 18	GER	POR	FRA	ESP	QAT				12th	43	4th	145
2017	Team Factory Vamag	87	(Italy) Lorenzo Zanetti	AUS	THA	ESP	NED	ITA	GBR	ITA	GER; 6	POR; 8	FRA; 6	ESP; 17	QAT; 11				16th	33	4th	145
2017	Team Factory Vamag	163	(Italy) Davide Stirpe	AUS	THA	ESP	NED	ITA	GBR	ITA; Ret	GER	POR	FRA	ESP	QAT				-	0	4th	145
2018	MV Agusta Reparto Corse by Vamag	3	(Italy) Raffaele De Rosa	AUS; 6	THA; 7	SPA; Ret	NED; 3	ITA; 3	GBR; 3	CZE; 3	MIS; 2	POR; 4	FRA; 7	ARG; Ret	QAT; 8				6th	133	2nd	138
2018	MV Agusta Reparto Corse by Vamag	86	(Italy) Ayrton Badovini	AUS; 9	THA; 15	SPA; Ret	NED; 12	ITA; Ret	GBR; 7	CZE; Ret	MIS; 10	POR; 8	FRA; 12	ARG; 11	QAT; 11				11th	49	2nd	138
2018	Extreme Racing Bardahl	63	(Italy) Davide Stirpe	AUS	THA	SPA	NED	ITA; DNS	GBR	CZE	MIS; 16	POR	FRA	ARG	QAT				-	0	2nd	138
2019	MV Agusta Reparto Corse	3	(Italy) Raffaele De Rosa	AUS; 18	THA; 5	SPA; 2	NED; Ret	ITA; 3	SPA; 5	MIS; Ret	GBR; 5	POR; Ret	FRA; 4	ARG; 6	QAT; 7				6th	101	3rd	109
2019	MV Agusta Reparto Corse	22	(Italy) Federico Fuligni	AUS; Ret	THA; Ret	SPA; 13	NED; 15	ITA; 14	SPA; Ret	MIS; 11	GBR; 18	POR; 14	FRA; Ret	ARG	QAT				17th	13	3rd	109
2019	MV Agusta Reparto Corse	22	(Italy) Filippo Fuligni	AUS	THA	SPA	NED	ITA	SPA	MIS	GBR	POR	FRA	ARG; 22	QAT; DNS						3rd	109
2020	MV Agusta Reparto Corse	3	(Switzerland) Randy Krummenacher	PHI; DSQ	JER	JER	POR	POR	ARA	ARA	ARA	ARA	CAT	CAT	MAG	MAG	EST	EST	-	0	3rd	140
2020	MV Agusta Reparto Corse	3	(Italy) Raffaele De Rosa	PHI; DSQ	JER; 5	JER; 5	POR; 3	POR; 12	ARA; 4	ARA; 3	ARA; 2	ARA; Ret	CAT; 14	CAT; 4	MAG; 4	MAG; Ret	EST; Ret	EST; 3	6th	135	3rd	140
2020	MV Agusta Reparto Corse	22	(Italy) Federico Fuligni	PHI; DSQ	JER; 13	JER; 14	POR; Ret	POR; 16	ARA; 12	ARA; 12	ARA; 10	ARA; 14	CAT; 17	CAT; Ret	MAG; 8	MAG; Ret	EST; 13	EST; 17	18th	32	3rd	140

Colour	Result
Gold	Winner
Silver	Second place
Bronze	Third place
Green	Points classification
Blue	Non-points classification
Blue	Non-classified finish (NC)
Purple	Retired, not classified (Ret)
Red	Did not qualify (DNQ)
Red	Did not pre-qualify (DNPQ)
Black	Disqualified (DSQ)
White	Did not start (DNS)
White	Withdrew (WD)
White	Race cancelled (C)
Blank	Did not practice (DNP)
Blank	Did not arrive (DNA)
Blank	Excluded (EX)

**Bold** – Pole position
Italics – Fastest lap
* Season in progress.
