= MV Agusta Dragster series =

Series of Italian streetfighter motorcycles

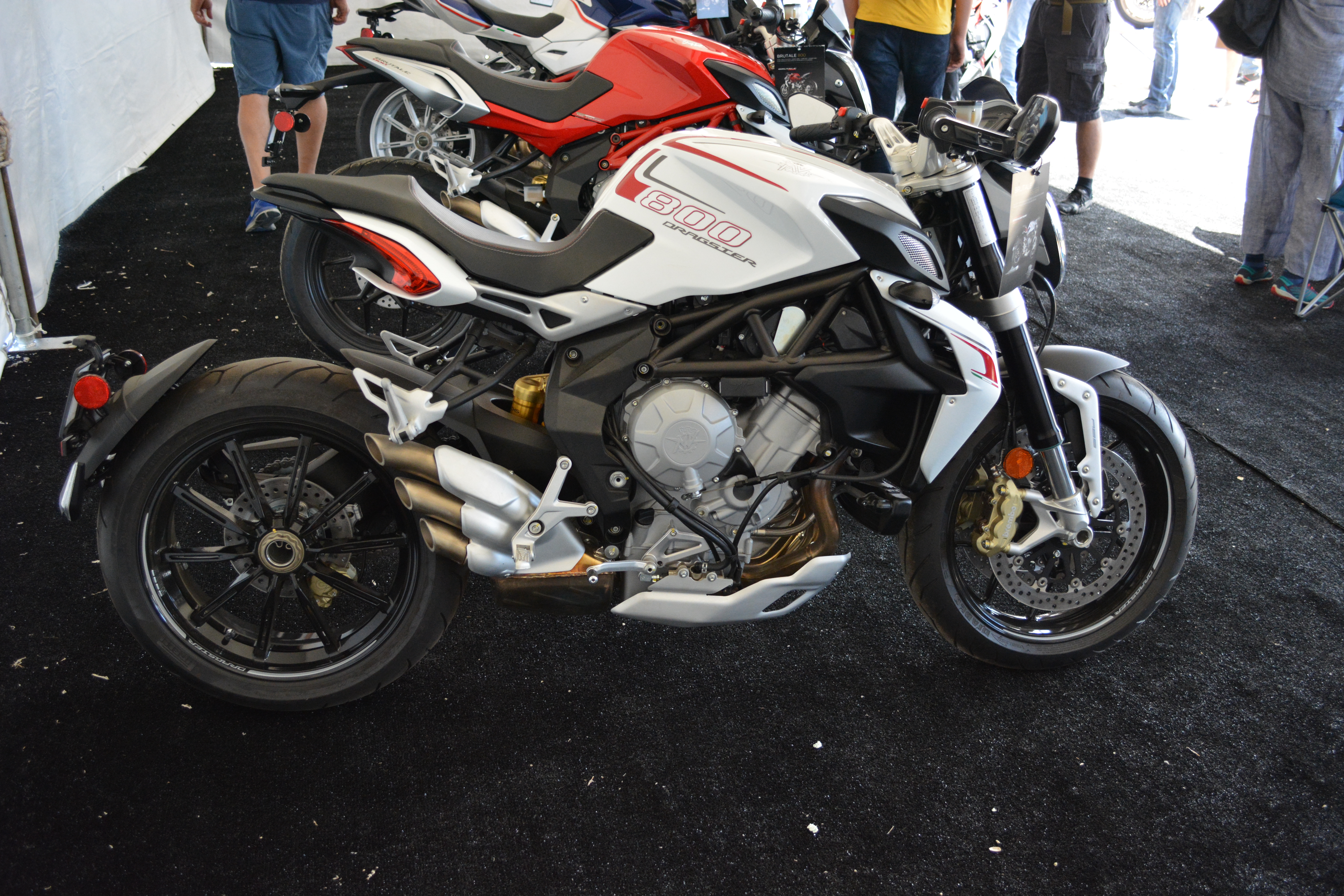
- 2015 MV Agusta Dragster 800
- Manufacturer: MV Agusta
- Production: 2014–present
- Class: Streetfighter
- Engine: Three cylinder, 4 stroke, 12 valve, DOHC
- Bore / stroke: 79 mm x 54.3 mm
- Transmission: Wet multi-plate clutch, 6 gears, chain drive
- Frame type: Lattice
- Suspension: Front: Telescopic forks Rear:Single-sided swingarm with single shock absorber
- Brakes: Disc brakes
- Tires: Front: 120/70ZR17; Rear: 200/50ZR17
- Related: MV Agusta Brutale series

The MV Agusta Dragster is a series of motorcycles produced by the Italian manufacturer MV Agusta. The bike is considered a streetfighter, or muscle bike, and is powered by an 800cc three-cylinder engine. Originally introduced in 2014 as the Brutale Dragster 800, part of the Brutale model lineup, the Dragster range was expanded and offered as its own series.

== Overview ==
First revealed at the 2013 Milan EICMA show, the Dragster was conceived as a more aggressive version of the naked Brutale. Initial sales were good, the model selling three times more than the predicted sales for 2014.

The models were updated for 2018. Engines were updated to meet the Euro4 European emission standards. The suspension components were also changed, resulting in a 20 mm longer wheelbase and 8.5 mm greater trail. The engine mounting points were revised to increase torsional rigidity.

=== Technical details ===
The 799 cc engine, originally designed by Ezio Mascheroni and first fitted to the F3, uses a DOHC inline three-cylinder layout with four valves per cylinder. A counter-rotating (reverse) crankshaft is used, which counteracts the centripetal forces of the wheels allowing the bike to turn faster. The bore and stroke are 79 mm and 54.3 mm.

The engine hangs from a tubular frame and is a stressed member. The machine has 43 mm upside-down Marzocchi forks, a Sachs rear shock absorber, a Brembo four-piston (front) and two-piston (rear) brake system. The wheels and swinging arm are made of aluminium. Other aluminium parts are the frame plates and the fork bridges. The machine has a full electronics suite, including traction control, ABS and four riding modes

== Model Variants ==
=== Dragster 800 ===
Introduced in 2014 as the Brutale Dragster 800, the machine was based on the Brutale 800. The rear bodywork was revised to accommodate a larger 200/50ZR17 tyre.

=== Dragster 800 RR ===
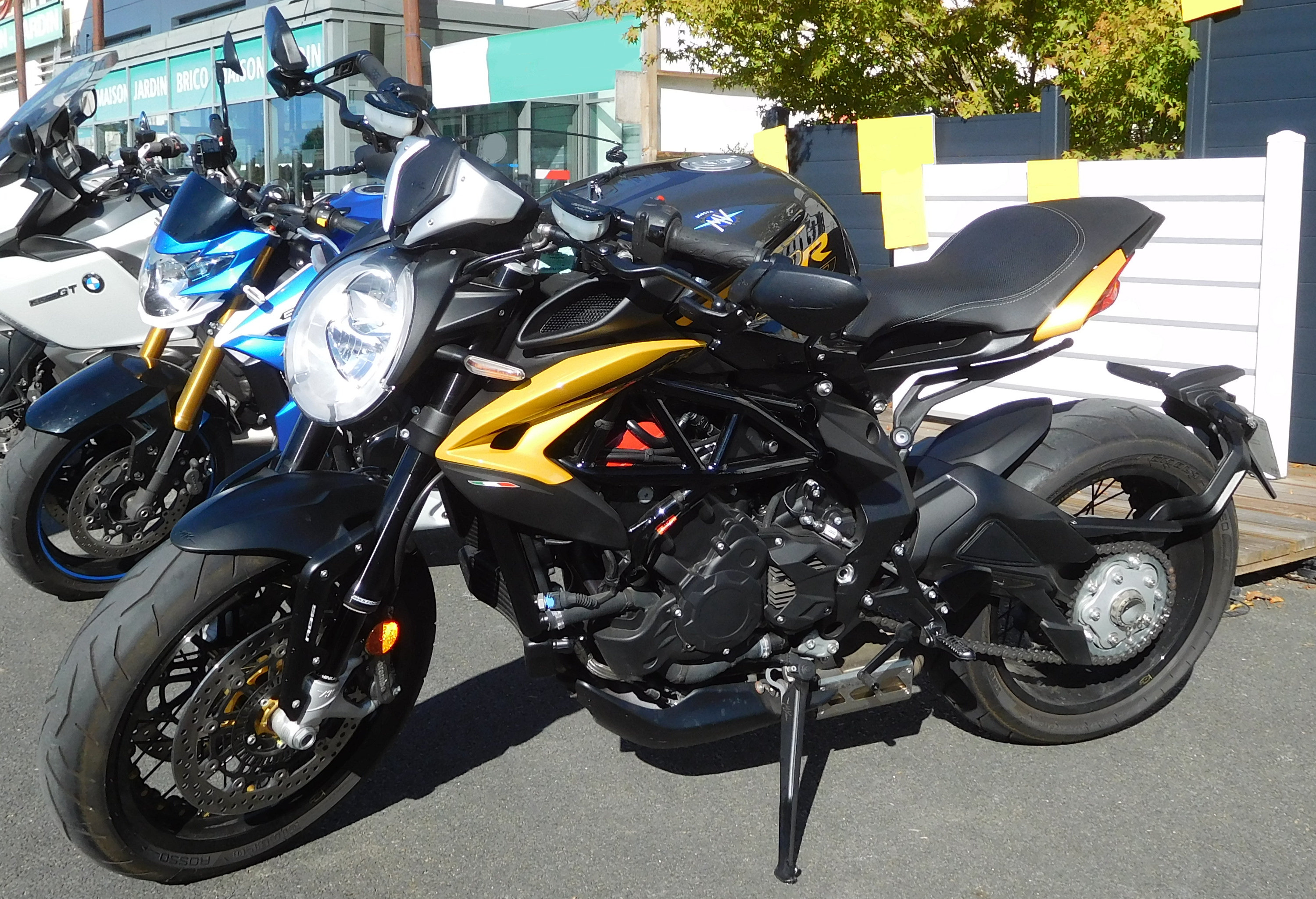
MV Agusta Dragster 800 RR

The Dragster 800 RR, introduced in 2015, is a more powerful version of the Dragster 800. Intake and exhaust modifications increased power output by 15 bhp to produce 140 (104 kW) bhp @ 13,100rpm. A quickshifter was fitted to the gearbox, allowing clutchless changes both up and down. The suspension was made stiffer and wire-spoked wheels fitted.

=== Dragster 800 RR SCS ===
The Dragster 800 RR was further enhanced for 2020 with the addition of the SCS 2.0 Smart Clutch System and designated the Dragster 800 RR SCS. The SCS 2.0 system, which was first fitted on the Turismo Veloce in 2018, allows the rider to use the clutch in a conventional manner with the lever, or simply allow the system to control the clutch. The system is based on the Rekluse clutch, which allows the rider to engage gear at tickover without using the clutch. Once the throttle is opened the clutch engages. The MV system adds electronic control, which optimises clutch engagement based on engine revs and throttle position, during up and down-shifts. The SCS system weighs just 36g more than a conventional clutch.

=== Dragster 800 RC ===
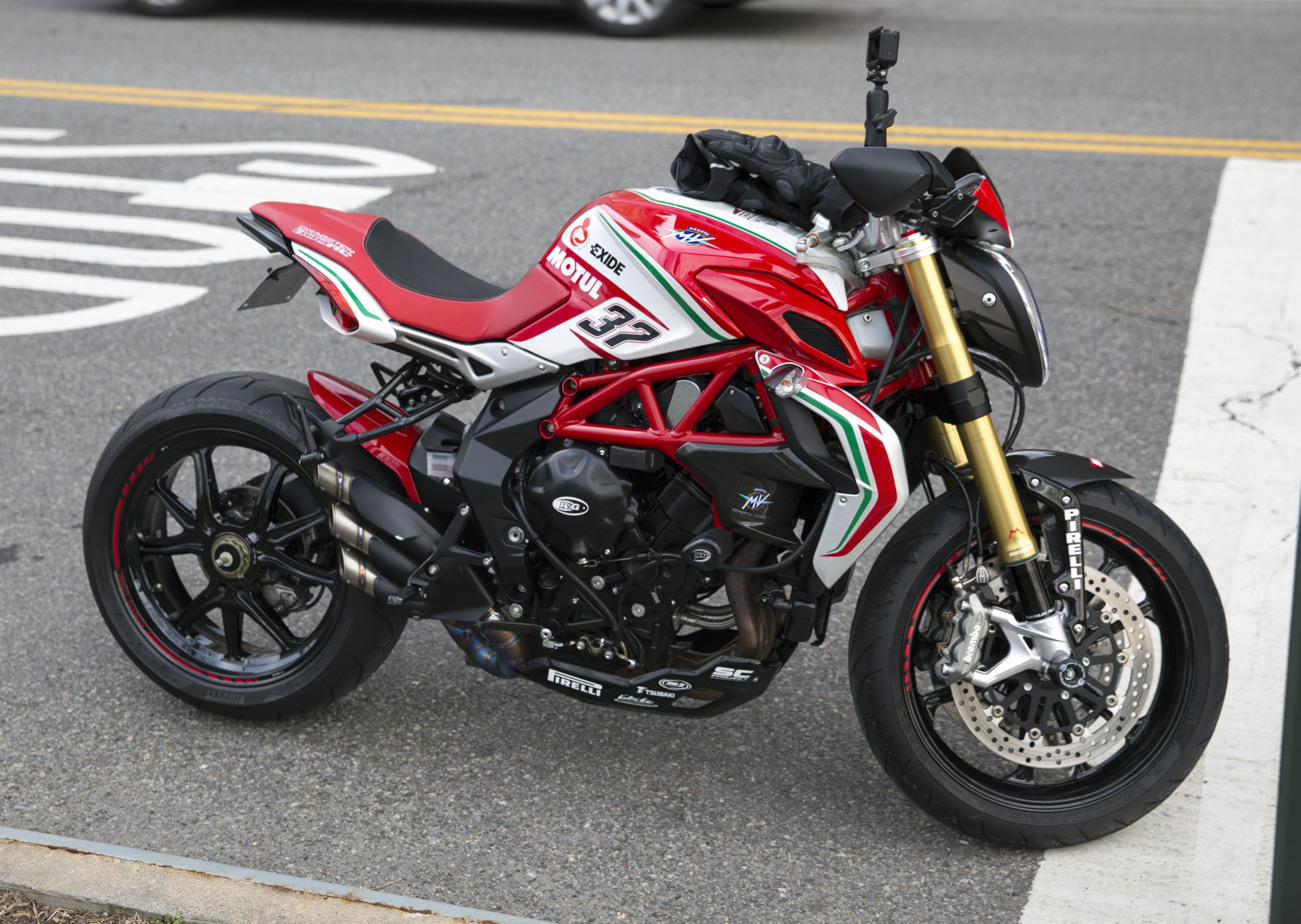
2017 MV Agusta Dragster 800 RC

Part of the Reparto Corse line-up, the Dragster 800 RC is a limited-edition model produced in 2017. Extensive use of carbon fibre bodywork and forged wheels contribute to reducing the dry weight to 168 kg. The machine used the same 140 bhp engine as the 800 RR. The machine was finished in a red, white and black livery with Reparto Corse graphics, including the number 37, which is the number of world championships MV Agusta have won. Production was limited to 350 units.

=== Dragster 800 RC SCS ===
A limited edition of the RC was introduced in 2021 with the clutch upgraded to the Smart Clutch System.

=== Dragster 800 RR LH44 ===
In 2018 the limited-edition Dragster 800 RR LH44 was produced. The machine was designed in collaboration with Formula 1 world champion Lewis Hamilton. Based on the Dragster 800 RR, the LH44 used carbon fibre components and finished in a distinctive red, white and black livery with Lewis Hamilton graphics, including the number 44 which is the number Hamilton races under in F1. Production was limited to 144 units.

=== Dragster 800 RR Pirelli ===
First presented in September 2018 at the opening of the P ZERO World of Monte Carlo, the limited-edition Dragster 800 RR Pirelli is a collaboration between MV Agusta and tyre manufacturer Pirelli. Based on the Dragster 800 RR, the tank slider and the fairing are manufactured in a rubber formulated by the Pirelli Research and Development department to resist scratches, scuffs and abrasions. The machine is available in Pirelli yellow/black or ice pearl white/America blue livery with Pirelli graphics. Pirelli Diablo Supercorsa SP tyres are fitted and have yellow or blue stripes on the sidewalls to match the livery.

=== Dragster 800 RR America ===
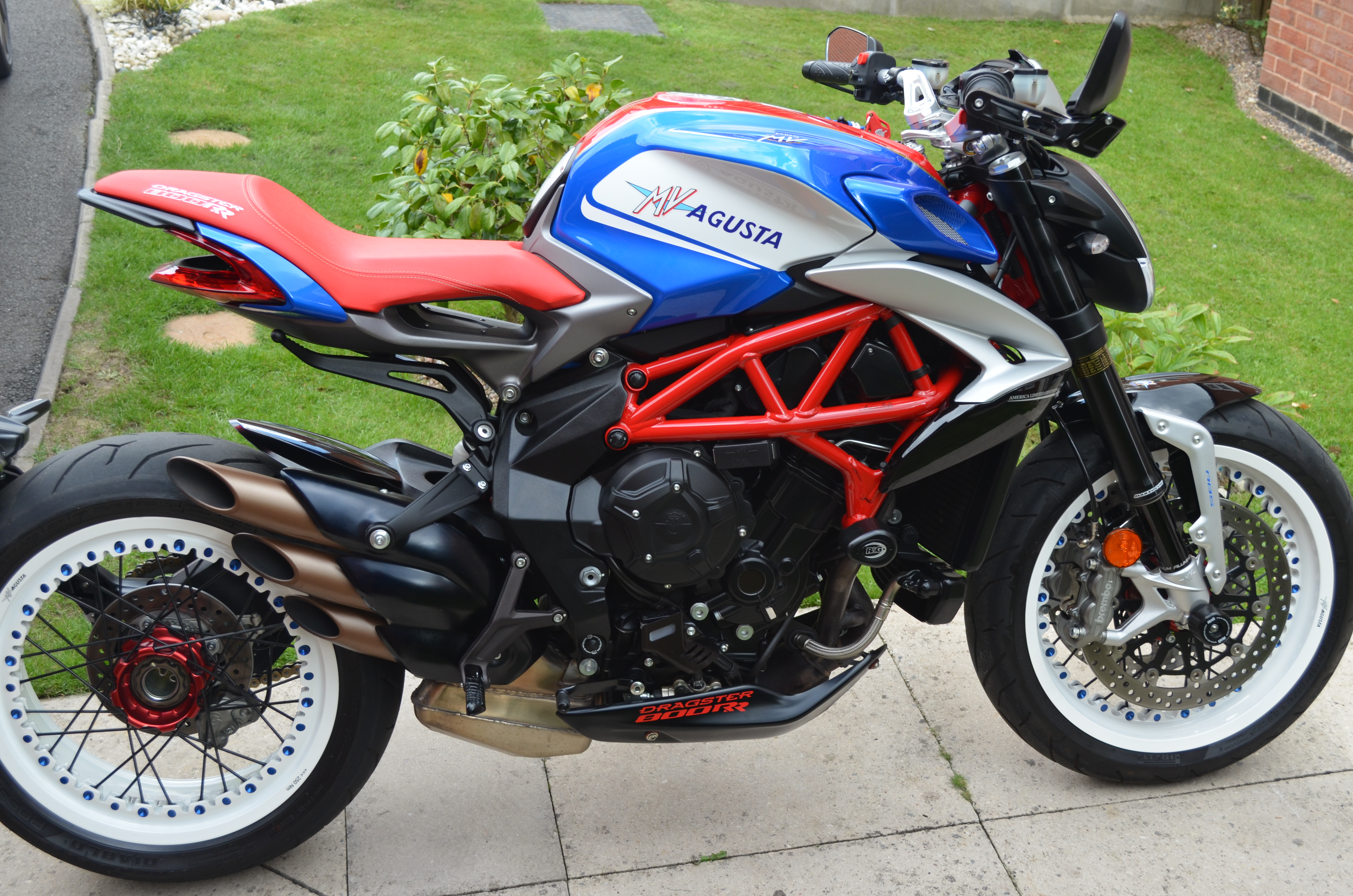
MV Agusta Dragster 800RR America, No. 039 of 200.

The 2019 Dragster 800 RR America is based on the 800 RR with a red, white and blue finish that plays tribute to the 1975 MV Agusta 750 Sport America and the American flag. The America blue/white/Ago red/deep black livery is complemented by the spoked wheels, which have red hubs, blue spoke retainers, and white rims. Production is limited to 200 units.

=== Dragster 800 Rosso ===
Introduced at the 2019 EICMA Milan Show, the Turismo Veloce 800 Rosso is part of MV's entry-level Rosso collection. Changes are minimal, such as the wheels being plain cast alloy rather than the milled finish of other models. The machine is finished is a distinctive red and black livery.
