= Tommaso Marchesi =

Italian composer

Tommaso Marchesi (Italian pronunciation: [tomˈmaːzo marˈkeːzi]; March 7, 1773 – June 6, 1852) was an Italian composer, conductor, and organist.

Marchesi was born in Lisbon, and studied music in Bologna where he was a pupil of Stanislao Mattei. He became a member of the Accademia dei Filarmonica before he founded the Accademia dei Concordi in 1808. He wrote concerti for the piano and the organ, a large amount of sacred music, art songs, choral music, and a symphony for wind instrument. The music archive at the San Petronio, Bologna has a large collection of his original manuscripts; most of which remain unpublished.
