= Víctor Marchesini (politician) =

Argentine lawyer and politician

Víctor Marchesini (1930–1999), born in Río Negro Province, was an Argentine lawyer and politician.
