= MV Agusta Rivale =

Italian motorcycle

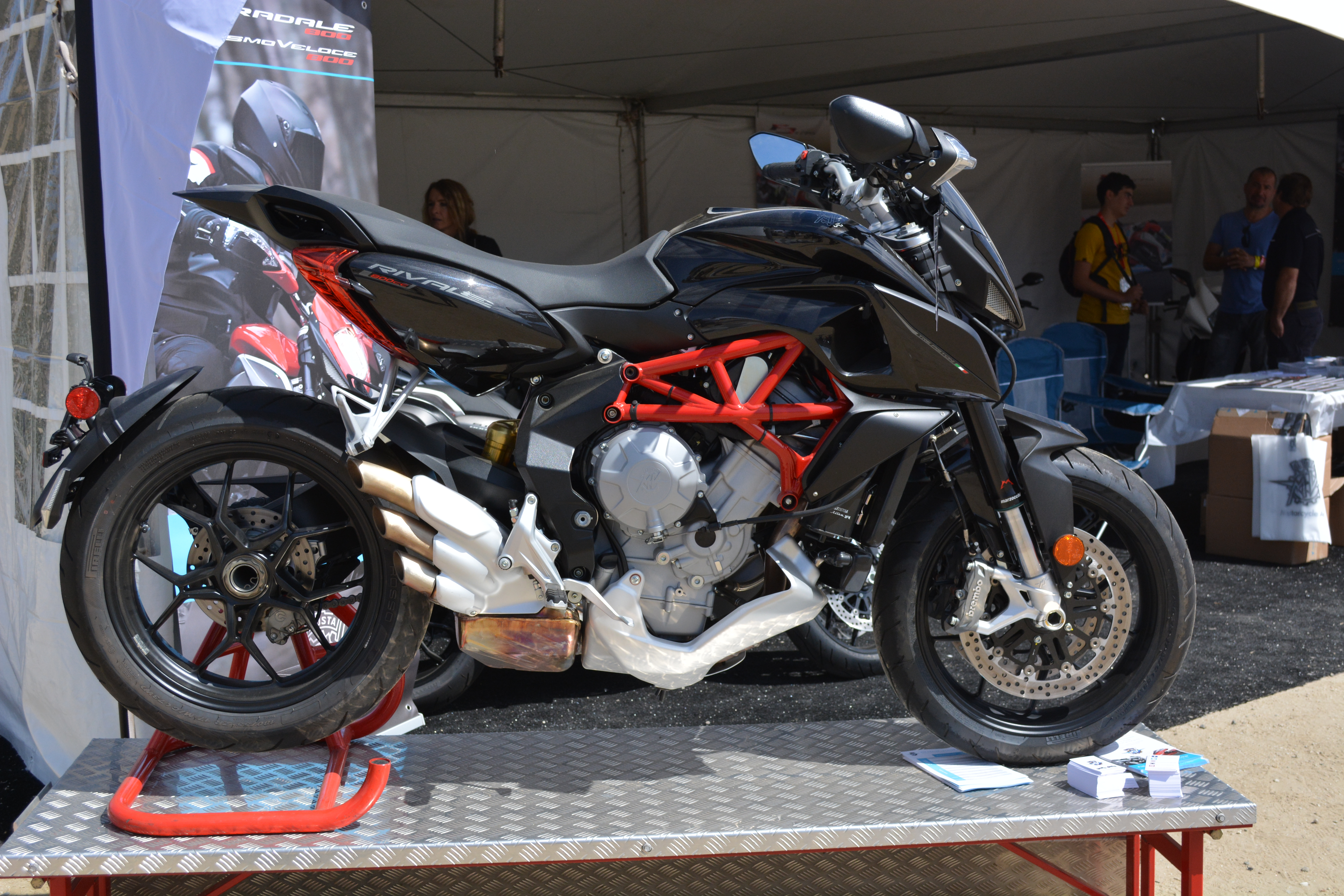
- MV Agusta Rivale
- Manufacturer: MV Agusta
- Also called: Rivale 800
- Production: 2013-2017
- Engine: 798 cc liquid cooled, three cylinder, 4 stroke, 12 valve, DOHC
- Bore / stroke: 79 mm x 54.3 mm
- Compression ratio: 13.3:1
- Top speed: 140 mph (225 km/h)
- Power: 125 bhp (93 kW) @ 12,000 rpm
- Torque: 62 ft-lb (84 Nm) @ 8,600 rpm
- Transmission: Wet multi-plate slipper clutch, 6 gears, chain drive
- Frame type: Lattice
- Suspension: Front: Marzocchi telescopic forks Rear: Cast aluminium single-sided swingarm with single Sach shock absorber
- Brakes: Brembo disc brakes Front:Twin 320 mm, radial four-pot calipers Rear: Single 220 mm, twin pot caliper
- Tyres: Front: 120/70 x 17; Rear: 180/55 x 17
- Rake, trail: 23.5°, 105 mm
- Wheelbase: 1,410 mm
- Dimensions: L: 2,070 mm W: 885 mm
- Seat height: 881 mm
- Weight: 178 kg (dry)
- Fuel capacity: 12.9 litres

The MV Agusta Rivale is a motorcycle that was produced by the Italian manufacturer MV Agusta from 2013 to 2017.

== Overview ==
The MV Agusta Rivale, which was designed by Adrian Morton, was first shown at the EICMA Milan Motorcycle Show in 2012, going into production in 2014. The styling was a cross between a Supermoto style machine and a naked (unfaired) sport bike. The engine and chassis are derived from that used in the Brutale 800. The machine's name was inspired by the Riva Rivale luxury yacht. MV's CEO, Giovanni Castiglioni, saw one of the yachts in a harbour on the French Riviera and liked the name. He contacted the manufacturers of the yacht, Riva, and arranged for the use of the name.

The design partially differs from other MVs, and reflects the larger Brutale and Dragster. It retained the characteristic 3-way exhausts on the right-hand side, saddle and tank shapes and the MV signature rhomboid-shaped headlight fitted into a small front fairing.

== Technical details ==
The liquid cooled 800 cc engine, which was originally designed by Ezio Mascheroni, is the larger of the two "triples" produced by MV at this time. The engine has a counter rotating crankshaft, normally only found on GP machines, which counteracts the centripetal forces of the wheels allowing the bike to turn faster. Bore and stroke are 79 mm and 54.3 mm and this short stroke allows the engine to rev to 13,000 rpm. It used DOHC and had four valves per cylinder and developed 125 bhp (92 kW) @ 12,000 rpm. Changes to the ECU, fuel injection and exhaust system gave more torque than the engine of the Brutale.

As is usual on modern MVvs, the lattice frame is made from steel tubes with aluminium sections around the swinging arm pivots. The single sided swinging arm is made of aluminium and controlled by a shock absorber. Marzocchi front forks were fitted and suspension travel increased over the Brutale model.

Brembo Disc brakes were fitted. The front being 320 mm double discs with radial four-pot calipers, and the rear a single 220 mm with twin pot caliper.

The machine used a ride by wire system. The MVICS (Motor Vehicle Integrated Control System) gave four different maps; sport, normal, rain and custom, which allowed the rider great control over the engine. 8 levels of traction control (TCS) were available as well as controls to set engine braking and the rev limiter.

== Rivale Urban Camo ==
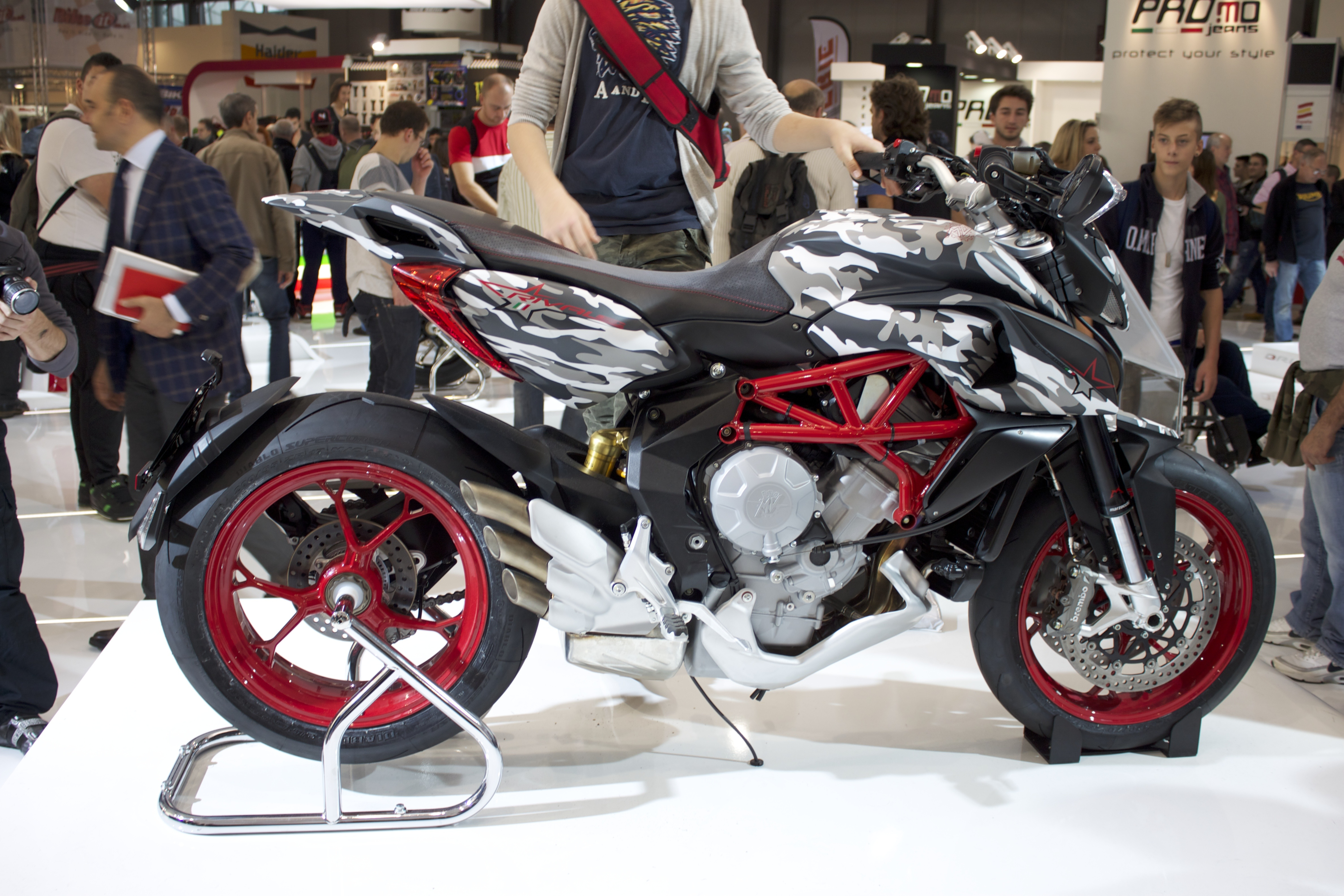
MV Agusta Rivale Urban Camo

MV Agusta CEO Giovanni Castiglioni commissioned a camouflage-painted machine for his own use, also fitted with F4 RR wheels and tyres. The design work was carried out by consultant William Melzi of TecnoArt Sersan. Following public interest when the bike was exhibited at the 2013 Milan Show, a limited edition was produced.
