= Magni (motorcycle) =

Italian motorcycle company

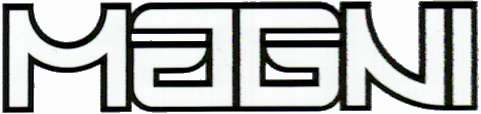
- Magni logo

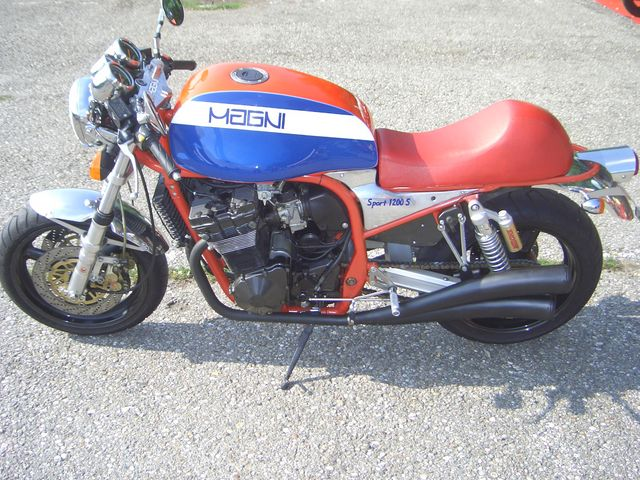
- Magni Sport 1200 S
- Formerly: EPM
- Industry: Mortorcycle and component manufacturer
- Founded: 1977 in city, Samarate, Italy
- Founders: Arturo Magni; Giovanni Magni; Carlo Magni
- Area served: Worldwide
- Website: www.magni.it

Magni is an Italian company that builds specialist motorcycles. The company is based in the city of Samarate in the province of Varese. Magni, in addition to building the bikes that bear its name, is also active in the construction of specials to order and a supplier of special parts for the restoration of MV Agusta classic motorcycles.

== History ==
Arturo Magni (24 September 1925 - 2 December 2015) began his career in the motorcycle sector in 1947 in the Gilera Racing Department. In 1950 he moved to MV Agusta's racing department and remained there until MV retired from competitions in 1977, when he had reached the position of Team Manager and Technical coordinator of Reparto Corse.

In 1977, together with his sons Carlo and Giovanni, he started his own business building special parts for the MV Agusta range of motorcycles in his workshop, the Elaborazioni Preparazioni Magni (EPM). In particular, the most challenging transformation and most in demand by customers consists in replacing the heavy shaft drive of the four-cylinder 750 with a more sporty chain final drive. Later he built his first chassis, in Cr-Mo tubes, around the four-cylinder MV Agusta. This frame was based on the Magni designed MV F750 S Imola racer.

EPM were one of the world's first suppliers of aftermarket cast-alloy wheels. Carlo Magni developed this side of the business and it was spun off into a separate business, leaving Arturo and Giovanni to continue building motorcycles under the Magni name.

=== Honda ===
This chassis demonstrated excellent dynamic qualities, but with MV Agusta stopping building motorcycles, Magni were left without an engine supply. Magni turned to Honda, who agreed to supply the four-cylinder Honda CB900F Bol d'Or engine.

Starting in 1980, two versions of the Magni-Honda were produced. The MH1 was a budget naked bike that used the Honda CB900F suspension, brakes and wheels. The MH2 was a fully faired version that used Ceriani forks, Brembo brakes and EPM wheels. Around 300 units were produced in 1980–1981, many going to Germany where the machine was given cult status.

=== BMW ===
After the success of the Honda powered machines, Magni's German importer, Hansen & Schneider, requested a BMW boxer engined model. Magni agreed and in 1982 the MB1 and MB2 were put into production using the 1,000 cc BMW R100 engines.

The MB1 was again a naked bike and used the BMW suspension and wheels, whereas the MB2 had a fairing, Forcella Italia (formerly Ceriani) and EPM wheels. Production was terminated when BMW launched the four-cylinder K100 and discontinued the boxer engine. 150 units were produced, but sales were slow, the last one only being sold ten years later. Arturo Magni said of the poor sales "They seem to believe that, whereas a European chassis manufacturer could certainly improve on what Honda or another Japanese manufacturer could produce, the same could never true of their beloved BMWs."

=== Moto Guzzi ===
Magni decided that they needed to produce an "All-Italian" motorcycle. At the time the only Italian manufacturers were Moto Guzzi and Ducati. With Ducati in difficulties and recently taken over by Cagiva, and Magni's experience with shaft drive machines, Moto Guzzi were approached for a supply of engines. The then owners, De Tomaso, were agreeable to supplying engines for an upmarket sports bikes.

The first Moto Guzzi powered model, the Le Mans, went on sale in 1985 using the 1,000 cc Moto Guzzi Le Mans engine. Rather than make a chain drive conversion, Magni designed a "Parallelogrammo" rear suspension to overcome the handling deficiencies caused by shaft drive.

In 1987 two further models were introduced; the Classico 1000 and the Arturo 1000. These models had a retro look with 1970s café racer styling. The Classico 1000 was a naked bike, and the Arturo 1000 had a half-fairing. The models were well received, especially in Japan, which became Magni's biggest market. In 1989 Magni introduced the Sfida 1000 model, which was styled on the Italian racing bikes of the 60s.

The success of the Magni machines was starting to outstrip Moto Guzzi's ability to supply the engines. Magni did consider using the Ducati 900SS engine to produce a Magni-Ducati, but were not convinced that Ducati would be a more reliable supplier than Moto Guzzi. A small batch of 400 cc engines were available and Magni produced the Sfida 400 for the Japanese market. (In Japan machines over 400 cc are taxed at a higher rate and require a special licence to ride).

In 1991, Magni's Australian importer, Ted Stolarski, commissioned a new racing machine using the four valve fuel injected Daytona engine. Using WP suspension, this was the first Magni to use monoshock suspension. Following Owen Coles' successful use of the machine in the "Battle of The Twins" (BoTT) series, a road legal version was introduced in 1993, which was named the "Australia".

Engine supply from Moto Guzzi was still problematic, but following the take-over of operations by Finprogelli, CEO Arnullo Sacchl made supply of engines to Magni a priority. This led to the introduction in 1996 of the Sfida 1100. The launch had been delayed over concerns about engine supply. This model featured an all new chassis.

The Sfida 1100 ie biposto was introduced in 1997 using the Guzzi “Electronic Fuel Injection” engine and a rear seat section capable of carrying a passenger, and in 1998 the Sfida 1000 4V with the Guzzi 4 valve engine,

Also in 1998 two other new models were released, the new Australia 98, which was fitted with the 102 hp 4-valve engines, and the "Giappone 52" a limited-edition model to commemorate 20 years of the Magni company and the 50 anniversary of Fukuda Motors, Magni's Japanese importer. This was a limited edition machine for the Japanese market.

Magni models were available in the U.S. market from 1998 following an agreement with the American Commerce Overseas Corporation (COC). COC was previously the importer of the MV Agusta 750 S and MV Agusta 750 Sport America models.

In 2011, a one-off racer, the Experience, was built for that year's Bol d'Or classic race, finishing in 7th position.

=== Suzuki ===
With ongoing supply problems with engines and doubts about the future of Moto Guzzi prior to the takeover by Aprilia, Magni looked for a source of new engines for future models.

The 750 cc four of the newly launched MV Agusta F4 series was considered but no engines could be supplied for at least two years. An arrangement with Suzuki was made to supply engines as used on the 1,200 cc Bandit.

A new model, the Sport 1200 S, was launched with the Suzuki engine. This naked model was styled to reproduce the 1970s MV Agusts 750S, including the red white and blue livery.

=== MV Agusta ===
In 2013, Magni renewed its partnership with MV Agusta. Using the MV Brutale 1090 chassis and powerplant, the Storia ("History" in Italian) was first shown in 2013 and went on sale to the public in the spring of 2014. The model features a handcrafted aluminium tank that resembles the tank of the 750S, a new rear subframe and seat, alloy mudguards and spoked Kineo wheels. A limited-edition version was produced in conjunction with Orobianco, an Italian fashion and accessories brand. The Storia Orobianco was fitted with a crocodile skin seat and RIZOMA accessories. Matching luggage from Orobianco was available.

First shown at the Milan EICMA show in 2014, the Filo Rosso model was introduced a year later. Using the 800 cc, three-cylinder engine from the MV Brutale in a Magni classic double-cradle twin shock frame, the fully faired machine was styled to look like the classic MV 3-cylinder GP machines as used by Giacomo Agostini. A naked bike was also produced using the Brutale engine, the F750S Tributo, which was styled to resemble the MV Agusta 750 S.

Arturo Magni died on 2 December 2015, his son Giovanni continued to run the company.

In 2018, a limited-edition version of the Filo Rosso was introduced, the Black Edition. As the name suggests, the bodywork is finished in black

== Models ==
=== Magni 832 ===
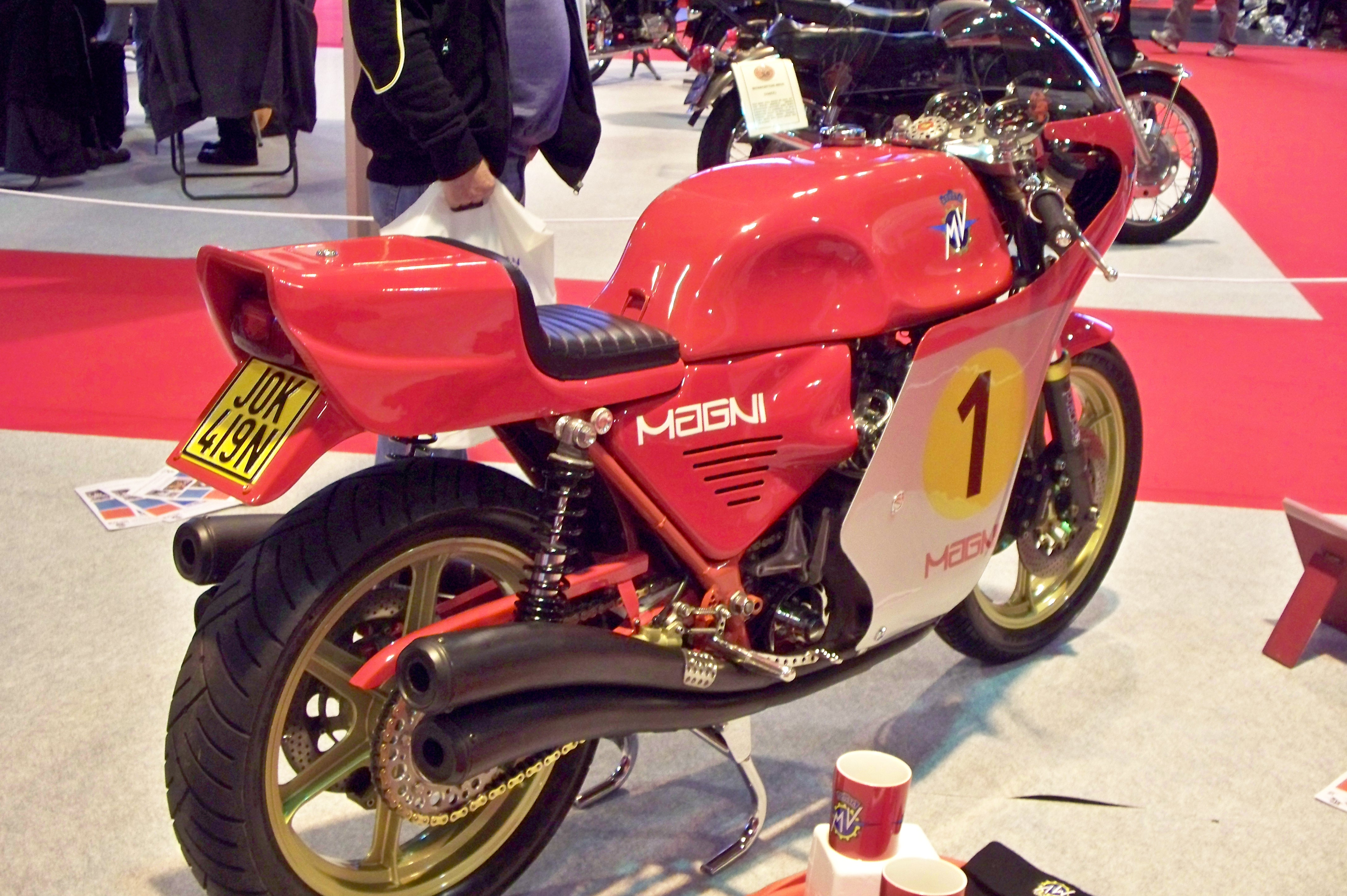
MV Agusta-Magni

Magni offered a range of parts to upgrade MV fours. They also manufactured complete motorcycles using the parts. The specification varied from customer to customer. Amongst the options were big-bore kits to bring the capacity up to 837 cc (as used on the MV 850 SS Monza), Dell'Orto carburettor kits, exhaust systems, drive chain conversions, the lightweight Magni frame, which was based on Magni's design for the F750 S Imola racer, EPM wheels, 4ls drum brakes and Brembo disc brakes.

=== Magni 861 ===
On the MV 4-cylinder engines the cylinders were cast individually. By casting the cylinders in pairs, Magni was able to fit larger liners and increase the bore. These cylinders are recognisable by having 9 cooling fins; the individually cast items having 11 fins. The Magni 861 used these cylinders with a 70 mm bore to give an 861 cc capacity. (Hansen & Schneider subsequently used the Magni cylinders to produce machines up to 1,000 cc.)

=== Hansen & Schneider 900 S Cento Valli ===
German MV importer Michael Hansen and his mechanic Roland Schneider commissioned Magni to build a 900 cc model, the 900 S Cento Valli. The engine used a 70 mm bore and a German crankshaft with a 2 mm increase in stroke, giving 892 cc. The standard MV frame and shaft drive were retained. About 10 of these models were made, which was also known as the 900 S Arturo Magni Cento Valli.

Magni subsequently supplied cycle parts to Hansen for other models, the engines being built by Schneider.

=== Magni-Honda MH ===
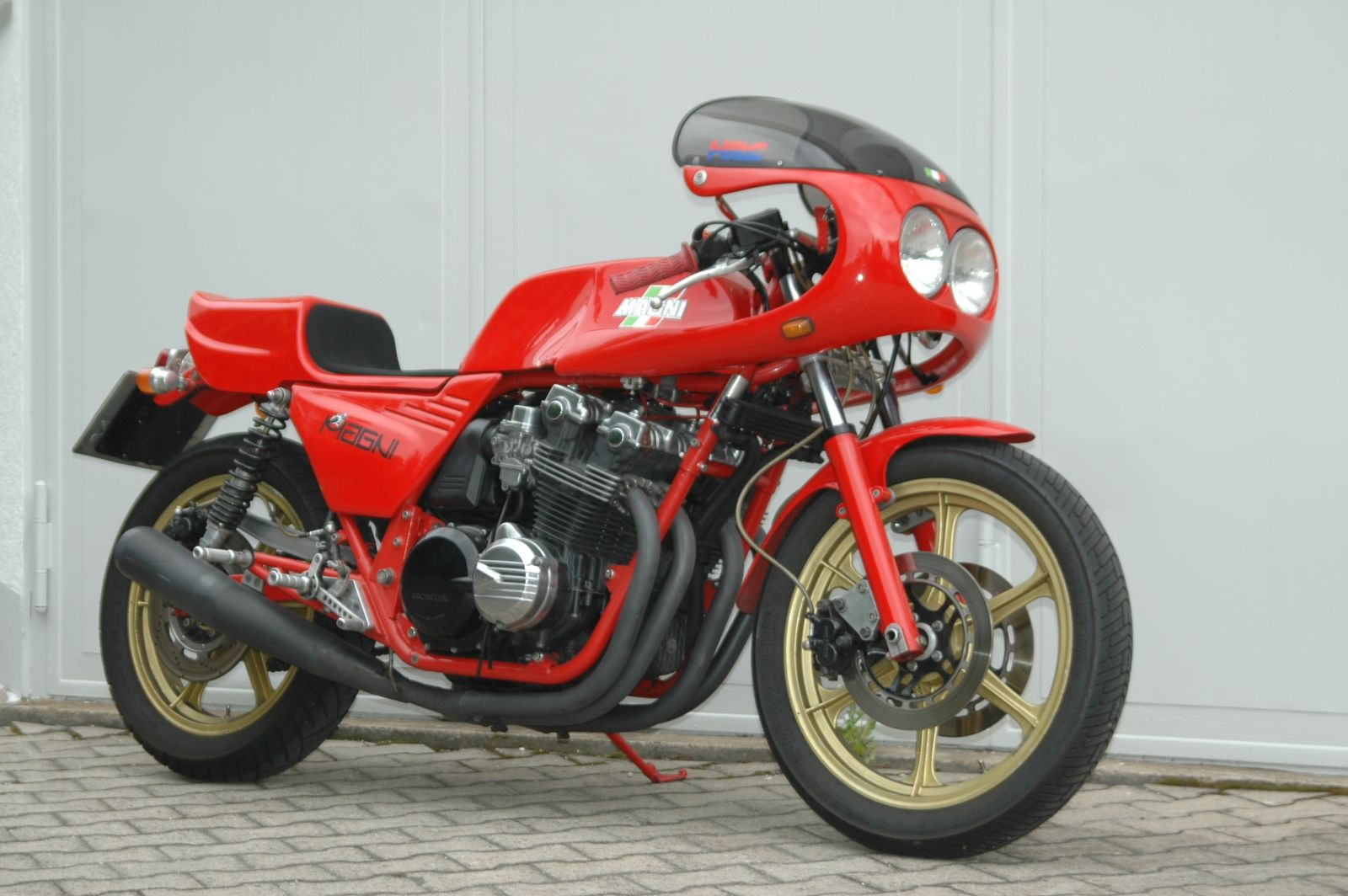
Magni-Honda MH2

Following the demise of MV Agusta in 1978, Magni turned to Honda for a supply of engines. An agreement to use the 4-cylinder CB900 Bol d'Or engine was made. Two variants were made; the naked MH1 which used Honda forks and wheels and the faired MH2, which used Italian forks, wheels and brakes. The exact specification of the machines varied according to the purchaser's requirements. Some had Eckert engine tuning components fitted and produced 120 bhp (90 kW). Around 300 Honda engined machines were made, many being sold in Germany.

The MH1 used a modified version of the Magni frame complete with tank, seat and side panels. The original Honda forks, wheels and brakes were used. tapered roller bearing were fitted to the steering head, the original ball bearings on the Honda being problematic.

The MH2 was fitted with a box-section swinging arm with eccentric chain adjusters, Tommaselli clop-ons, Forcella Italia forks, Brembo brakes and Magni's in-house EPM cast wheels.

With Honda phasing out the inline four in favour of the V4 Honda VF1000, Magni again looked for a new engine supplier.

=== Magni-BMW MB ===
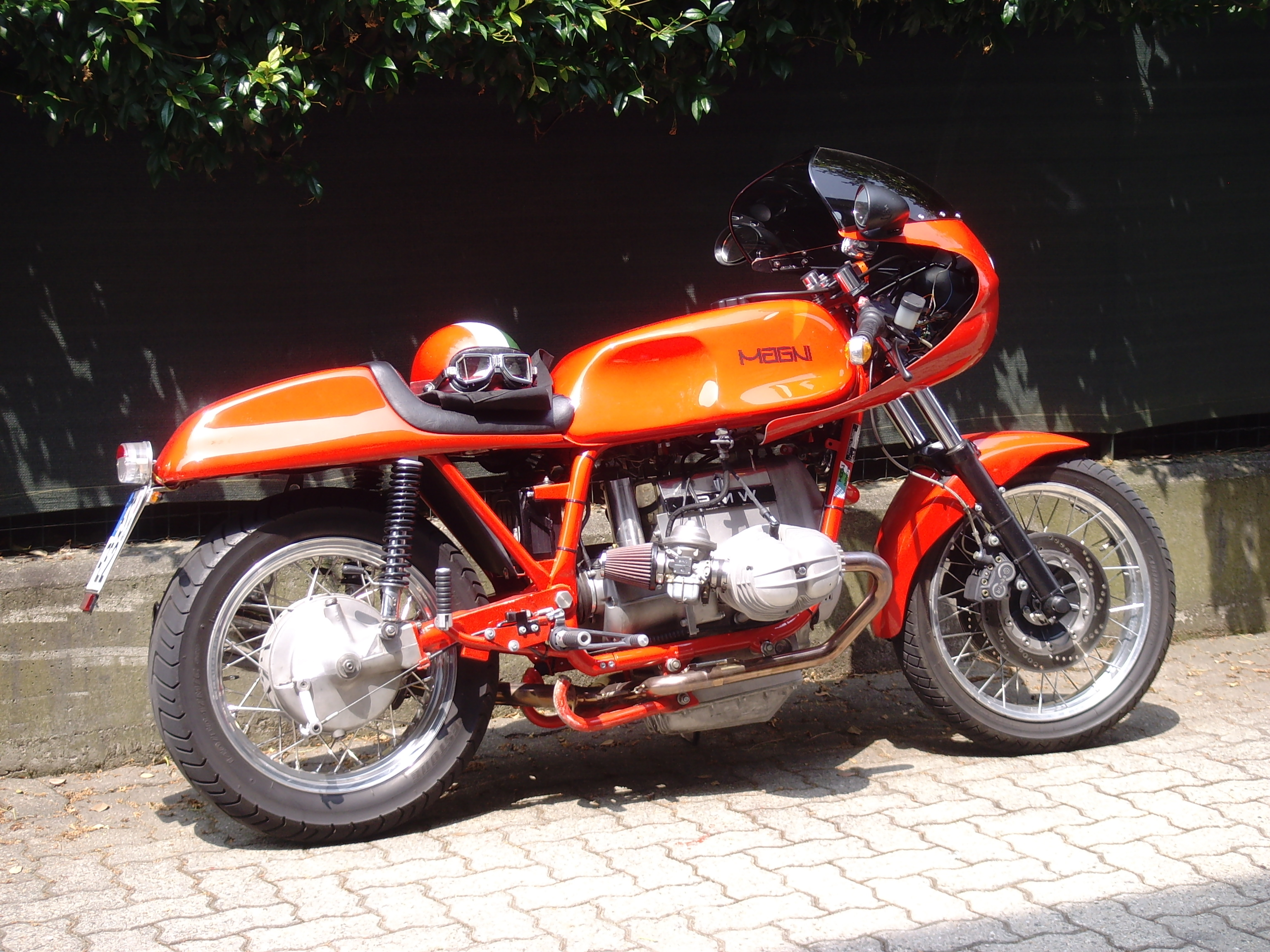
Magni-BMW MB1

After the success of the Honda powered machines, Magni's German importer, Hansen, requested a BMW boxer engined model. Magni agreed and in 1982 the MB1 and MB2 were put into production using the 1,000 cc BMW R100 engines. As with the Honda engined machine, two variants were produced; the naked MB1 and the more highly specified, faired MB2.

The MB1 used a newly designed Magni frame with removable sections to allow easy engine removal. A large 26 litre steel tank was fitted as according to the German importer, "BMW drivers always want a big tank". BMW forks and wheels were fitted.

Forcella Italia (formerly Ceriani) forks and EPM wheels were fitted to the MB2. A fairing from French designer Claude Bonin was also fitted.

Sales were slow and when BMW launched the four-cylinder K100 and stopped boxer production the model was discontinued. About 150 machines were produced.

=== Magni-Guzzi LeMans 1000 ===
Magni wanted to produce an "all Italian" machine and turned to Moto Guzzi for a supply of engines. The first Guzzi engined machine was the Magni-Guzzi LeMans 1000, using the engine from the Le Mans 1000. A new frame was designed, which had similarities to the Lino Tonti designed Moto Guzzi item. Magni introduced the "parallelogram" rear suspension, previously used on the 1950 shaft drive MV Agusta 500 cc GP machines, which negated the torque reactions of the shaft drive and made the handling more predictable. (A parallelogram kit was made available to upgrade the rear suspension of Moto Guzzi models)

The bodywork, which was designed by Arturo Magni himself, has contemporary 1980's styling and is fulling enclosing with a full fairing and one-piece tank, seat and side panels unit. Only the cylinder heads showed outside the fibre-glass bodywork. 40mm Forcella Italia forka and Koni rear shock absorbers were used.

=== Magni-Guzzi Classico 1000 ===
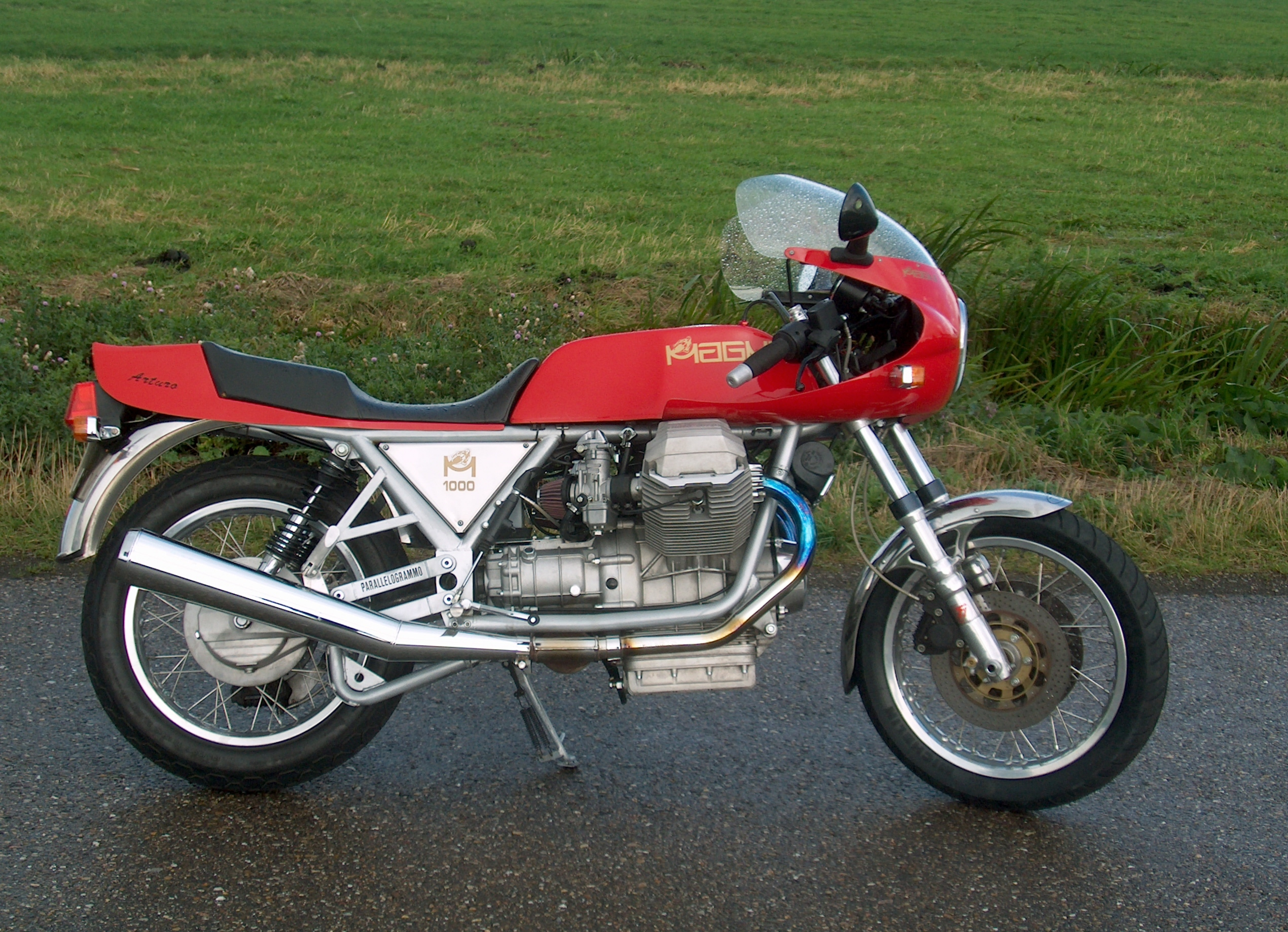
Magni-Guzzi Arturo 1000

To meet demand from international buyers, Magni introduced a retro 1970's styled naked version of the LeMans, the Classico 1000 in 1987. The machine had no fairing, a classic shaped tank, dual seat, stainless steel mudguards, a large round headlight and wire wheels.

=== Magni-Guzzi Arturo 1000 ===
Also introduced in 1987 and based on the Classico 1000, the Arturo 1000 was fitted with a half-fairing.

=== Magni-Guzzi Sfida 1000 ===
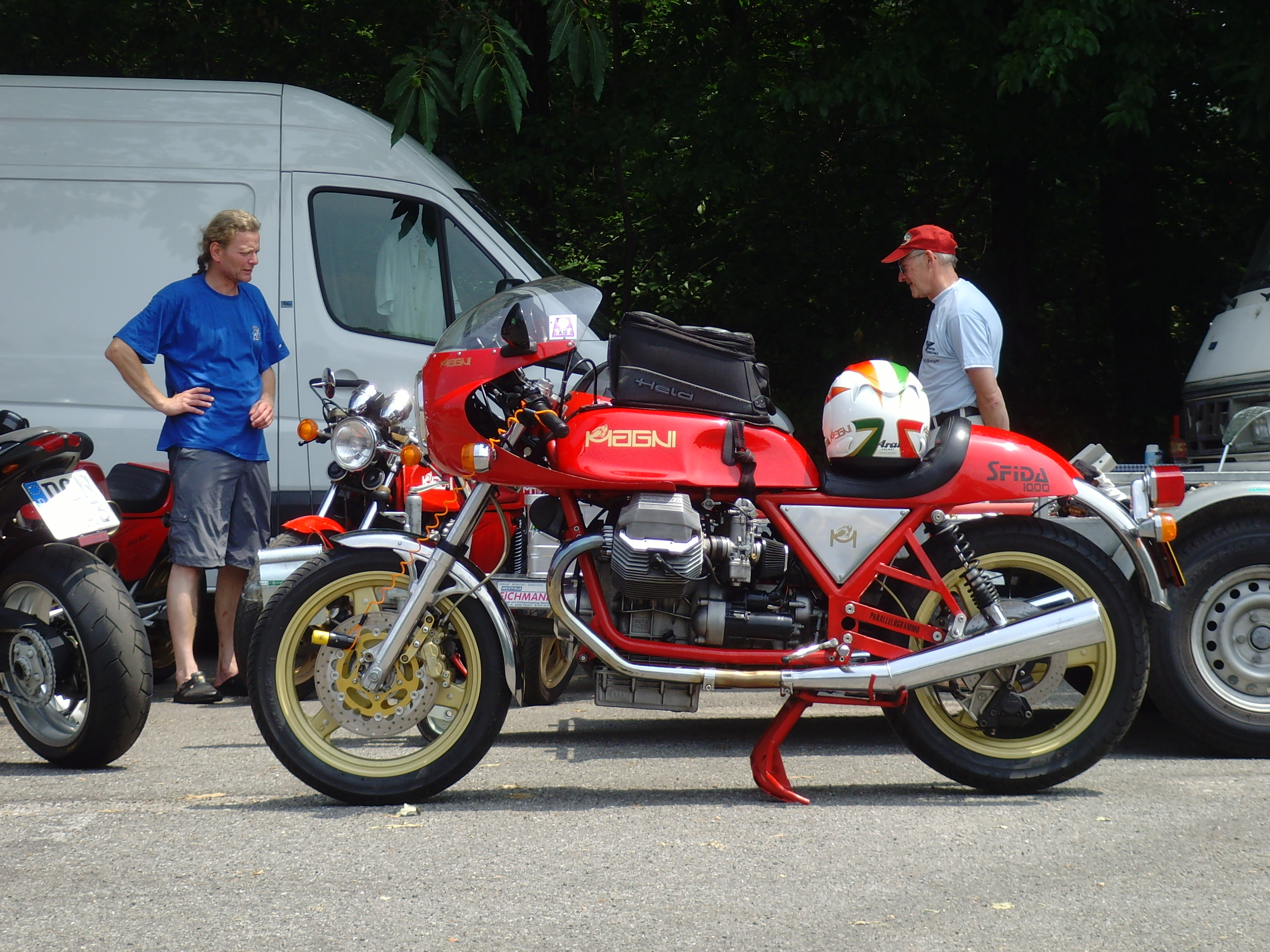
Magni-Guzzi Sfida 1000

In 1989, Magni introduced the Sfida 1000 (Sfida being Italian for "challenge"). The machine continued the use of the Guzzi Le Mans 1000 engine and was styled to reflect the Italian MV and Gilera racing machines of the 1960s. The machines were fitted with a hand-beaten aluminium fuel tank, a humped racing seat and a half-fairing. Around 58 Sfida 1000 models were produced.

=== Magni-Guzzi Sfida 400 ===
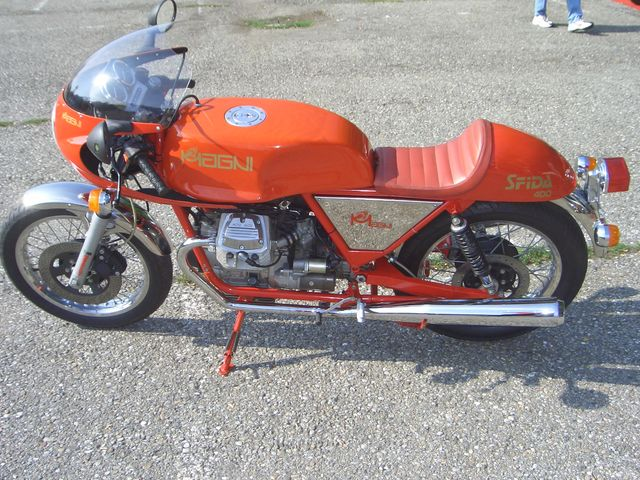
Magni-Guzzi Sfida 400

Moto Guzzi were struggling to supply engines to Magni, but ninety 400 cc engines became available. Magni used these engines to produce the Sfida 400 model, which was sold on the Japanese market in 1992. 400 cc machines were popular in Japan as larger bikes required a special licence to ride and attracted heavy taxation. The machine was styled to reflect the larger Sfida model, but was physically smaller. Marzocchi forks and 18" wheels were fitted. The machine was light, giving good performance from its 35 bhp (26 kW) engine. It was also renowned for its good handling, especially on twisty roads.

=== Magni-Guzzi Australia ===
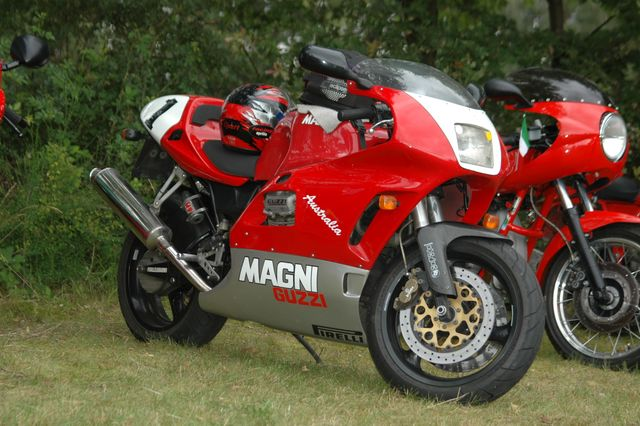
Magni-Guzzi Australia

In 1989, Ted Stolarski, a Perth-based motorcycle dealer who served as Moto Guzzi's sole national importer and distributor for Australia, approached Arturo and Giovanni Magni at the IFMA Köln motorcycle show in Germany, seeking a custom chassis to house one of the hand-built prototype 992cc 4-valve OHC V-twin engines he had received as a gift from the Moto Guzzi factory. The prototype engine, developed by Umberto Todero and Dr. John Wittner, had been publicly displayed at the 1989 Milan show still fitted with carburettors, not fuel injection; the production Daytona 1000 released in 1992 used Weber-Marelli electronic fuel injection. Magni built two prototype frames for Stolarski around these engines, both featuring Magni's patented Parallelogrammo twin-shock rear suspension. The first prototype (P1) debuted at the 1990 Daytona Pro-Twins event in the United States; the second (P2) debuted at Wanneroo Raceway, Western Australia, in 1991. At the 1990 Daytona Pro-Twins event, P1 was piloted by Owen Coles, whose performance at Daytona and subsequent venues — including a win over Doug Brauneck on Dr. John's own factory racer at Palm Beach, Florida — contributed to Magni's decision to develop a production version of the Australia, inspired directly by the successes of the Stolarski race team. Arturo and Giovanni Magni unveiled the production Magni Australia at the 1991 Milan EICMA show, naming it in honour of Stolarski and his role in initiating the project. The production model adopted monoshock rear suspension and used the fuel-injected Daytona 1000 engine rather than the carburetted prototype units. Due to Moto Guzzi prioritising initial engine supply for their own Daytona 1000 production run, the Magni Australia did not reach customers until 1993. Approximately 75 Series 1 examples were produced.

==== Magni-Guzzi Australia 98 ====
Magni entered the US market in 1998 when Commerce Overseas Corporation (COC) became their importers. (COC had previously imported MV Agusta 750 S and 750 Sport America models). Magni produced on updated version of the Australia, the Australia 98. The updated model used the Moto Guzzi Daytona RS engine with Weber-Marelli fuel injection and a revised chassis. 50 machines of this model were made. After the introduction of the 98, the previous model started to be referred to as the Australia 93.

=== Magni-Guzzi Sfida 1100 ===
Magni delayed the launch of the Sfida 1100 until 1996 due to engine supply problems. The cafe racer styled machine used the LeMans engine that had been fitted with a 1,100 cc big bore kit. A new chassis was fitted which retained the "Parallelogramo" swinging arm. Front forks were from Forcelle Italia, rear shock absorbers from Koni and Brembo Gold Line brakes were fitted.

==== Magni-Guzzi Sfida 1100 ie biposto ====
The Sfida 1100 was updated in 1997 to the Sfida 1100 ie biposto. The updated machine was fitted with the Guzzi “Electronic Fuel Injection” engine rather than the carburettors of the previous model, and a seat that could be converted to carry a pillion passenger.

=== Magni-Guzzi Sfida 1000 4V ===
In 1998 the Sfida 1000 4V was introduced. The 102 bhp 4 valve 992 cc Moto Guzzi Daytona engine was fitted and the bike used a monoshock version of the parallelogram rear suspension. Side panels were made of carbon-fibre. As with previous Sfida models, cafe-racer tank, humped seat and half-fairing were fitted. The machine used monoshock rear suspension.

=== Magni-Guzzi Giappone 52 ===
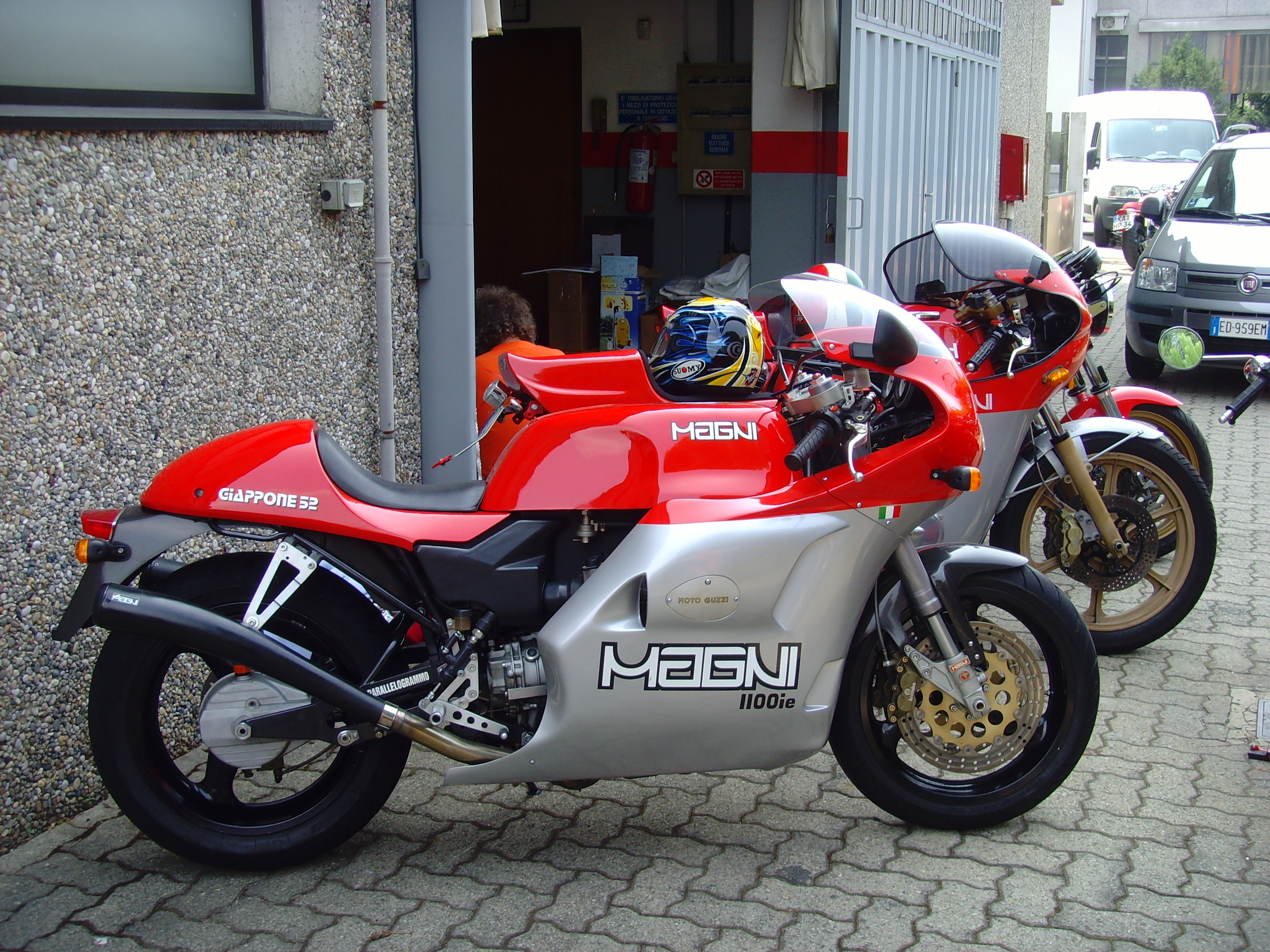
Magni-Guzzi Giappone 52

The Giappone 52 (Japan 52) was a limited edition produced in 1998 to mark the 50th anniversary of Magni's Japanese importer, Fukuda Motors, and to commemorate 20 years of the Magni company. The machine was a fully faired version of the Sfida, using the 2-valve 1064 cc engine with Weber Marelli fuel injection. The model is recognisable from the bulges in the fairing that cover the cylinder heads. 52 examples of the model were made.

=== Magni-Suzuki Sport 1200 S ===
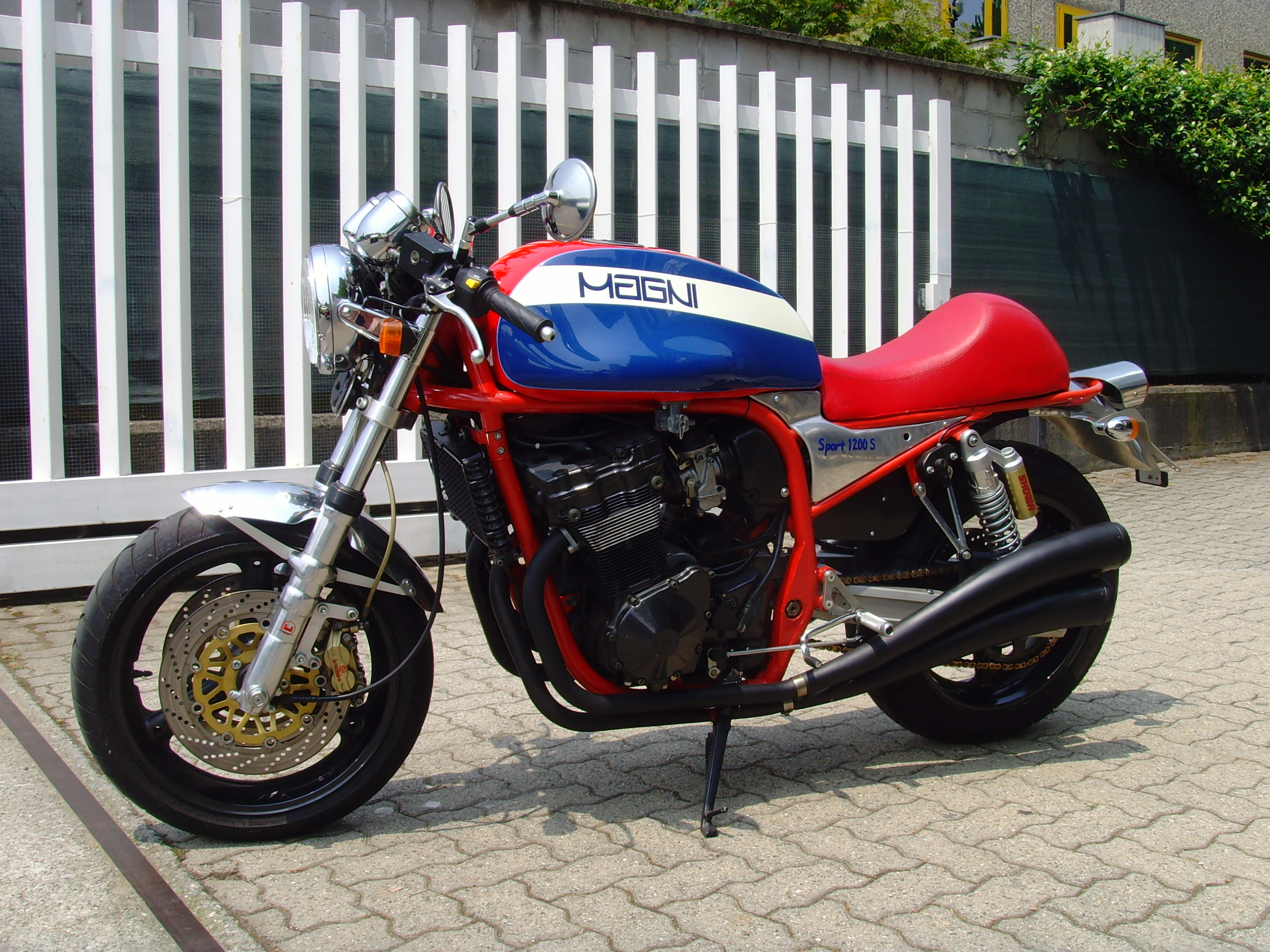
Magni-Suzuki Sport 1200 S

Styled to resemble the iconic MV Agusta 750S, the Sport 1200 S used an engine from the Suzuki 1,200 cc Bandit. The engine was housed in a Magni twin-shock frame. The swinging arm was from a Suzuki GSX 1200 Inazuma (a retro styled version of the Bandit) and Cerani forks and Brembo four-piston calipers and twin discs were fitted to the front end. A tank, seat and exhausts resembling the 750S items and chrome mudguards were fitted. The instruments, wheels, switchgear and master cylinders were from the Bandit. 10 of these models were produced.

=== Magni-MV Storia ===
Over 30 years since the previous MV engined Magni, the Storia was introduced in 2013. The model is based on the MV Brutale 1090 and is a "reinterpretation of the 1972 MV 750S". It retains the Brutale chassis which is modified with a hand-beaten aluminium tank that resembles the “disco volante” tank of the 750S and a 70's style humped seat. The seat requires a new rear sub-frame. Aluminium mudguard and side covers are fitted and other bodywork parts are in carbon-fibre. Also fitted are a windshield, custom exhaust and spoked Kineo wheels. The machine is available as a complete bike or as an upgrade kit for a standard Brutale.

==== Magni-MV Storia Orobianco ====
The Storia Orobianco was a limited edition of the Storia produced in conjunction with the Italian fashion and accessories brand Orobianco. It featured a crocodile skin seat made by TecknoMonster, a customised windshield and side coversand various parts from Rizomsa such as the rear-sets and mirrors. A matching range of suitcases was available.

=== Magni-MV Filo Rosso ===
First shown at the Milan EICMA show in 2014, the Filo Rosso model was introduced a year later. Using the 800 cc, three-cylinder engine from the MV Brutale in a Magni classic double-cradle twin shock frame, the fully faired machine was styled to look like the classic MV 3-cylinder GP machines as used by Giacomo Agostini. The bike is fitted with classic Ceriani forks, 18” magnesium alloy wheels and a twin-disc Brembo front brake. The bike weights just 145 kg (320 lb) and with the 125 bhp from the Brutale engine has stunning performance.

==== Magni-MV Filo Rosso Black edition ====
A limited-edition version of the Filo Rosso, the Filo Rosso Black edition, was introduced in 2018. The machine is finished in black with a red frame.

=== Magni-MV F750S Tributo ===
The F750S Tributo pays tribute to the 1970s MV Agusta 750S and is produced using all-Italian components. The machine uses the 3-cylinder 3-cylinder 800cc from the MV Brutale. A completely new frame was designed for the Tributo with revised geometry.

Multi-adjustable 43 mm ORAM forks, produced especially for this model, are fitted. Rear shock absorbers are also from ORAM. 320 mm discs are fitted with 4 pot calipers from Brembo. The spoked wheels from JoNich Wheels are designed to allow tubeless tyres to fitted.

The model has a red, white and blue "flying saucer" tank and red sculptured seat reminiscent of the 750S.

== Bibliography ==
- Brown, Roland (1993). Super Bikes: Road Machines of the '60S, '70S, '80s and '90s. Book Sales, Incorporated. ISBN 9781555218607.
- Cathcart, Alan (January 1993). "Magni Guzzi: What if you built the world's trickiest Moto Guzzi and nobody came?". Cycle World Magazine. pp. 46–47.
- Cathcart, Alan (May 2003). "Magni-ficent machines". Italian Bike. pp. 47–51. Archived from the original on 2012-04-27.
- Catterson, Brian (January 2000). "Sfida 1000 4V". Cycle World Magazine. pp. 60–61.
- Cloesen, Uli (2013). BMW Café Racers. Veloce Publishing Ltd. ISBN 9781845845292.
- de Prato, Bruno (January 1999). "Quick Look: Magni-Guzzi Sfida 1100ie Old World Meets Future Tech". Cycle World Magazine. p. 32.
- Egan, Peter (January 2000). "Magni Australia". Cycle World Magazine. pp. 56–61.
- Falloon, Ian (2011). The Book of the Classic MV Agusta Fours. Veloce Publishing Ltd. ISBN 9781845842031.
- Grizzi, Otto; Clarke, Massimo; Masetti, Marco; Verrini, Michele (2007). La moto italiana: tutti i modelli dalle origini a oggi (in Italian). Giunti. ISBN 9788809048720.
- Noakes, Keith (2015). Motorcycle Road & Racing Chassis: A modern review of the best independents. Veloce Publishing Ltd. ISBN 9781845848880.
- Pullen, Greg (2018). A-Z of Italian Motorcycle Manufacturers. The Crowood Press. ISBN 9781785004889.
- Walker, Mick (1999). Moto Guzzi Twins Restoration. MotorBooks International. ISBN 9781610590853.
