= MV Agusta 600 =

Motorcycle manufactured by the company MV Agusta from 1966 to 1970

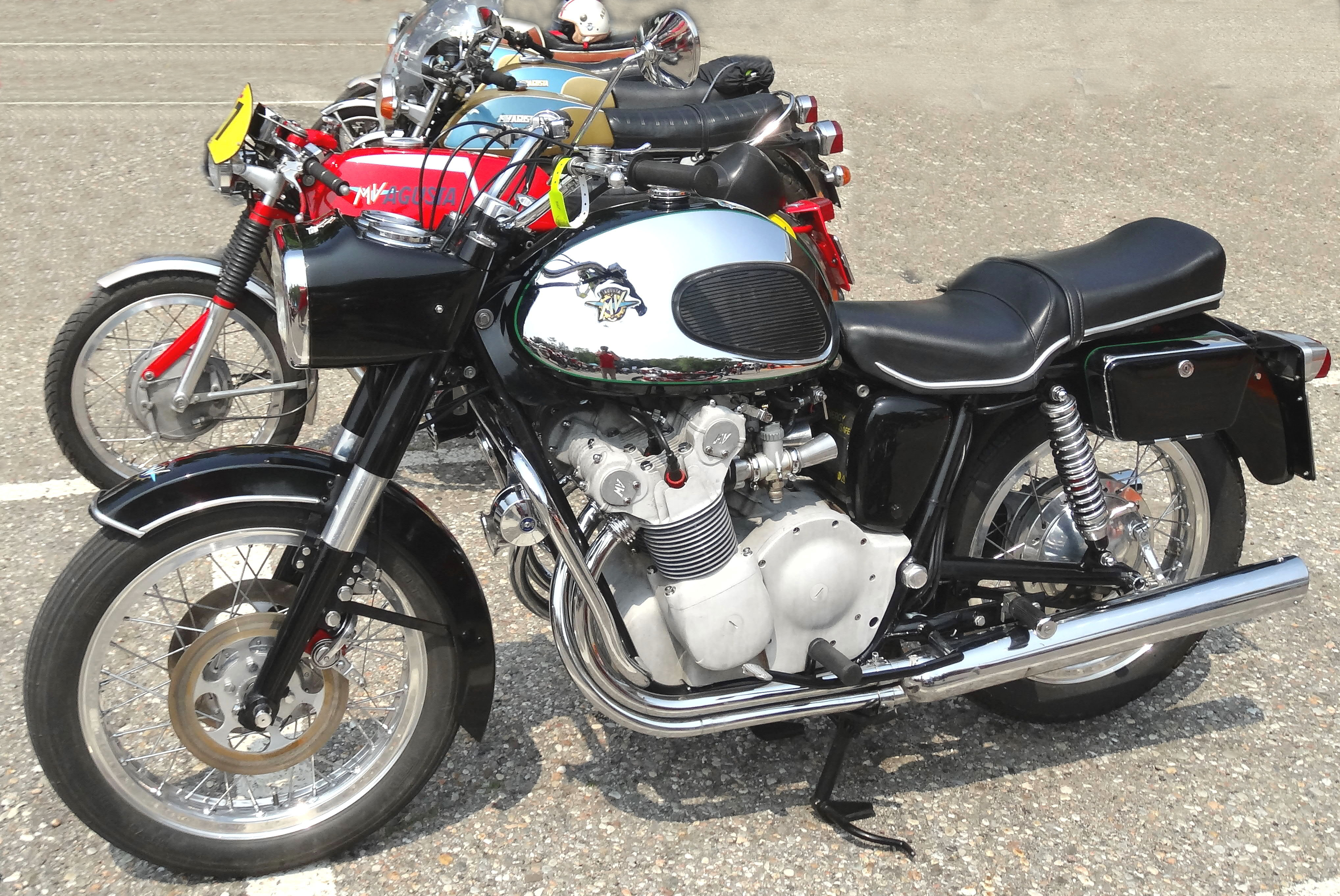
- MV Agusta 600 at the MV gathering at Malpensa Airport, Milan, Italy in 2013
- Manufacturer: MV Agusta
- Also called: MV Agusta 600 4C; MV Agusta 600 Turismo
- Production: 1966 to 1970
- Successor: MV Agusta 750 S
- Class: Touring motorcycle
- Engine: 592 cc (36 cu in) 4 cylinder DOHC; Four 24 mm Dell'Orto carburetors
- Bore / stroke: 58 mm × 56 mm (2.3 in × 2.2 in)
- Compression ratio: 9.3:1
- Top speed: 185 km/h (115 mph)
- Power: 52 bhp (39 kW) @ 8,000 rpm
- Ignition type: Coil
- Transmission: 5-speed cassette gearbox Shaft drive
- Frame type: Half-duplex cradle
- Suspension: Front: Teledraulic forks Rear: Swingarm with hydraulic dampers
- Brakes: Front: Cable operated 214 mm double disc brake (later 230 mm drum brake); Rear: 200 mm drum brake
- Tires: Front: 3.50 x 18; Rear: 400 x 18
- Wheelbase: 1,390 mm
- Weight: 221 kg (dry)
- Fuel capacity: 20 l

The MV Agusta 600, also called the MV Agusta 600 4C and the MV Agusta 600 Turismo, was a motorcycle built by the MV Agusta company from 1966 to 1970. For the first time, a four-cylinder engine was fitted transversely to the direction of travel on a standard motorbike and cable-operated disc brakes were used. A total of 135 of this model were manufactured.

== Development ==
Dr. Pietro Remor designed a racing engine for MV Agusta for the World Motorcycle Championship based on the Gilera four-cylinder, for which he was previously responsible. The engine of the 1950 MV 500/4 Cardano was inclined 30 degrees forward and had two overhead camshafts. Between the 2nd and 3rd cylinder was the shaft for the spur gears. Bore and stroke were 54 mm, and the inlet and outlet valves had a 90 degree between them. Behind the crankcase, the gearbox was installed transversely. On the basis of this racing engine, MV Agusta developed a production engine with lower compression, power and engine speeds to increase reliability. The production of the first motorcycle with transverse in-line four-cylinder was announced in 1950 by MV Agusta, a prototype (500 Tourismo) presented, but never went into production. In November 1965, the MV Agusta 600 was finally launched at the Milan Motorcycle Show.

== Technical data ==
The air-cooled four-cylinder engine was installed transversely across the motorcycle chassis, predating the bestselling fours from Honda and Kawasaki. The heart of the MV Agusta four-cylinder is the crankcase rack. The crankshaft, cylinder and cylinder head were mounted on it. The rack took the nine-piece crankshaft in six bearing blocks, as well as the spur gears in the control tower for the double camshaft drive. After loosening twelve nuts, the units mounted on the rack could be lifted out. Particularly striking was the fine ribbing of the cooling fins on the sump and the oversized cylinder head housing the double camshaft drive. The transversely mounted cassette transmission was driven by the engine through helical gears. It was connected to the shaft drive to the rear wheel via a spiral bevel gear angle drive.

A novelty was the cable-operated disc brakes on the front telescopic forks, which was later replaced by a double sided drum brake. At the insistence of Count Agusta, the machine was built as a tourer. The large rectangular headlight, the humpbacked tank and raised handlebars were not ideal for sports riders. The black paint that the machine was finished in caused it to be nicknamed the Black pig. It was also called one of the ugliest motorcycles its time. After the more powerful and more beautiful shaped model, the MV Agusta 750 S, was presented in 1970, it was the end of the unloved motorcycle. The MV Agusta 600 is today considered the most wanted and most expensive model of the older MV Agusta motorcycles.

== Specials ==
The 600 was finished in black, but one blue and one yellow special were produced. There was also a rumour of one being finished in red, but this is not recorded in the factory records.

A Chartreuse Yellow version was produced for Kym Bonython of Adelaide Australia. The blue special was made for Vittorio Emanuele, Prince of Naples as a thank you for brokering a deal for Agusta helicopters with the Shah of Iran. When MV test rider Fortunato Libanori tried to deliver the bike to the Geneva residence of Emanuele, he was chased away by Emanuele's mother Marie José of Belgium. The bike was entrusted to a local garage, from where Emanuele could ride it without his mother's knowledge.

The Austrian, Wolfgang Stropek, finished tenth (although 3 laps behind Giacomo Agostini on the works MV Agusta 500 Three) in the 1969 Finnish 500 GP. The bike was equipped with a fairing, a final chain drive and a reduced displacement engine in order to fit within the 500 cc category limit.

=== Bimota ===
The most well-known special based on MV 600 is the one that Massimo Tamburini created in 1971 when Bimota (of which he was one of the founding partners) was a company that dealt with heating and air conditioning. (Tamburini would later go on to design the MV Agusta F4 series).

The Rimini designer created the bike during his spare time starting with a second-hand 600, which was the subject of extensive work on the chassis, mechanics and aesthetics. The chassis was stiffened with triangulation absent on the MV, the suspension components were replaced with Ceriani and the cable operated front disc brakes and the original rear drum brake, unsuitable for sports use, were replaced with high performance Fontana drum brakes. The engine received the head, cylinders and pistons of the MV 750 Sport, the head was ported and four Dell'Orto SS 24 carburettors used. The shaft drive was replaced by a chain.

On the aesthetic side, the original fairing-free bike was changed into a street replica of the famous Grand Prix bikes on which Giacomo Agostini triumphed. This reworking gained the appreciation of the enthusiasts (including Angelo Bergamonti, who tested it on the occasion of a visit to Cascina Costa di Tamburini) and the disapproval of Count Domenico Agusta, who did not like these modifications of his machines. The revised motorbike weighed about 200 kg (24 kg less than the original 600) and its 69 bhp engine (compared to the 52 of the original "600 Turismo") allowed it to exceed 220 km/h (140 mph), with a clear improvement in performance even compared to the contemporary 750 S.

Tamburini sold the special some time later to an acquaintance in Modena. Passing through the hands of several owners, it was partially rebuilt in 2002. The bike is now in a private collection in Bologna.

== Bibliography ==
- Ash, Kevin (2002). Ducati People: Looking Into the Lives of the Men and Women Behind this Legendary Marque. Haynes. ISBN 978-1859606865.
- Colombo, Mario; Grizzi, Otto; Patrignani, Roberto (2016). MV Agusta: From 1945 to the present. Giorgio Nada Editore Srl. ISBN 9788879116176.
- Falloon, Ian (2011). The Book of the Classic MV Agusta Fours. Veloce Publishing Ltd. ISBN 9781845842031.
- Livolsi, Saverio (June 2009). "Opera prima". Motociclismo d'Epoca (in Italian). 2009 (6).
- Patrignani, Roberto (March 1997). "MV Agusta 600 4C". Motociclismo d'Epoca (in Italian). 1997 (3).
- Walker, Mick (1998). Mick Walker's Italian Racing Motorcycles. Redline Books. ISBN 9780953131112.
