= MV Agusta 750 Sport America =

Motorcycle manufactured by the company MV Agusta from 1975 to 1977

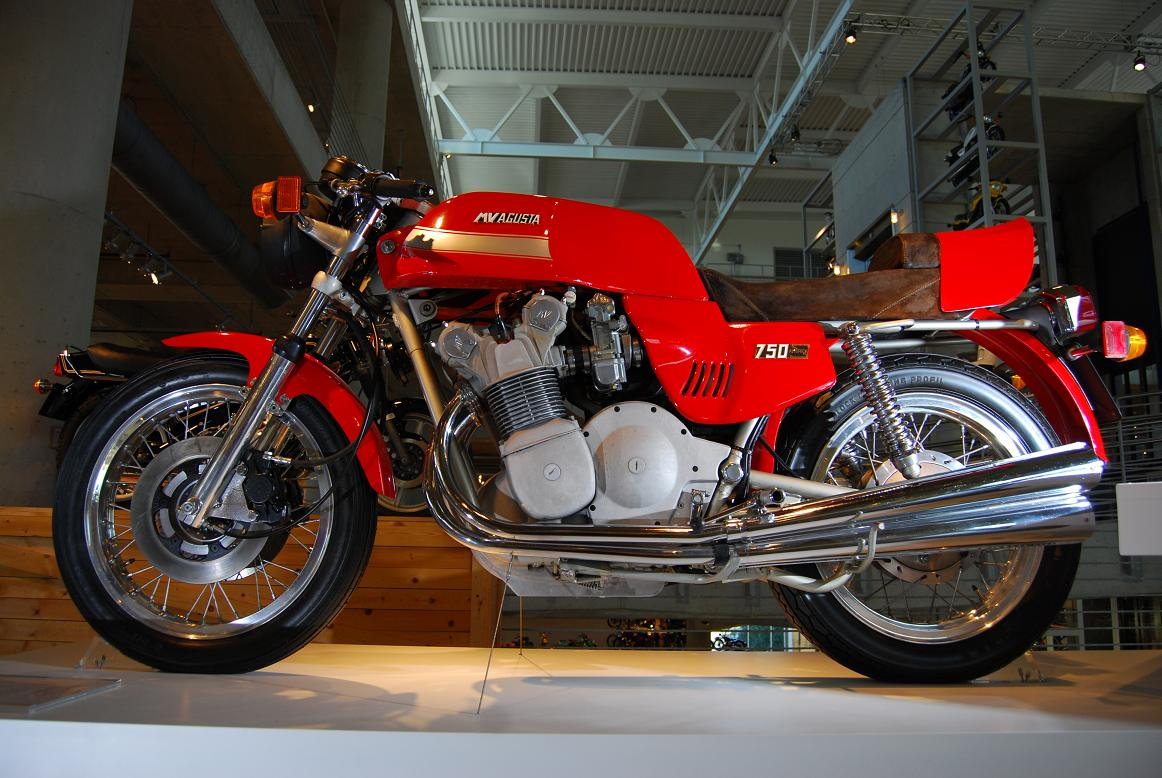
- MV Agusta 750 Sport America
- Manufacturer: MV Agusta
- Also called: MV Agusta 750 S America; MV Agusta 800 S America
- Production: 1975 to 1977
- Predecessor: MV Agusta 750 S
- Successor: None
- Class: Sport bike
- Engine: 789.7cc 4 cylinder DOHC; Four 26mm Dell'Orto carburetors
- Bore / stroke: 67 mm × 56 mm (2.6 in × 2.2 in)
- Top speed: 210 km/h (130 mph)
- Power: 75 bhp (56 kW) @ 8,500 rpm
- Ignition type: Coil
- Transmission: 5-speed cassette gearbox Shaft drive
- Frame type: Half-duplex cradle
- Suspension: Front: Ceriani Teledraulic fork Rear: Swingarm with hydraulic dampers
- Brakes: Front: double 280 mm disc brakes Rear: 200 mm drum brake (280 mm disc brake from 1976)
- Wheelbase: 1,390 mm
- Weight: 240 kg (dry)

The MV Agusta 750 Sport America (also called MV Agusta 750 S America in Germany, and MV Agusta 800 S America) was a motorcycle manufactured by the MV Agusta company from 1975 to 1977. Derivative models were produced in limited numbers until 1982, and the Magni models are still available to special order.

== Development ==
In 1974 MV Agusta suffered financial difficulties and came under state administration. In 1975, Chris Garville and Jim Cotherman of Commerce Overseas Corporation, the US MV importers, initiated the new edition of the MV Agusta 750 S. The appearance should be more closely based on MV's racing machines, with the aim of increasing sales in the US. Within 50 days, the designs of the two entrepreneurs were implemented at the Gallarate plant.

== Technical data ==
The core of the engine was formed by the crankcase rack. In the rack was mounted the nine-piece crankshaft, assembled in six bearing blocks using roller bearings, as well as the spur gears in the control tower for driving the two camshafts. After loosening twelve nuts, the units mounted on the rack could be lifted out. Bore was increased by 2 mm over the 750 S models to increase capacity to 789cc. Individual light alloy cylinders (a block was used on the 1100 Grand Prix model) with cast liners were used with Borgo pistons. The two valves of each cylinder were actuated by bucket tappets from two overhead gear-driven camshafts. Particularly striking was the fine ribbing of the cooling fins on the sump as well as the oversized cylinder head acting by the double camshaft drive. The gearbox was transversely mounted in a cassette. It was connected to the shaft drive to the rear wheel via a spiral bevel gear angle drive. The engine was, like all MV four-cylinder models, assembled by hand.

The diameter of the Ceriani telescopic forks was increased from 35 to 38 mm, and double disc brakes were used on all models. The gear shift was transferred to the left side of the engine. The red livery, the suede-covered seat and the Smiths round instruments made this a sporty and elegant motorcycle.

== Model variants ==
	800 SS Super America	800 SS Super Daytona America	850 SS Monza
Production	1975–1978	1976–1978	1977–1978
Capacity	789 cc	789 cc	837 cc
Bore/Stroke	67 × 56 mm	67 × 56 mm	69 × 56 mm
Power	82 bhp (61 kW) @ 9.000 rpm	90 bhp (67 kW) @ 10.000 rpm	90 bhp (67 kW) @ 9.000 rpm
Secondary drive	Shaft	Shaft	Shaft
Wheelbase	1420 mm	1420 mm	1420 mm
Maximum speed	210 km/h (130 mph)		235 km/h (146 mph)
Production quantity			27

- MV Agusta 750 Sport America (1975–1977): Basic 789 cc version derived from the MV Agusta 750 S.
- MV Agusta 800 SS Super America (1976–1978): Enhanced version (82 bhp (61 kW) @ 9000 rpm) of the 789 cc base engine for the US market, optionally available with a 4-in-1 Magni exhaust system and magnesium wheels.
- MV Agusta 800 SS Super Daytona America (1976–78): Further increased in performance with a Magni kit, a full fairing was also offered.
- MV Agusta 850 SS Monza or MV Agusta 850 SS Boxer (1977–78): Bore increased to 69 mm to give 837 cc capacity and a Magni Motorkit fitted to give 90 bhp (67 kW) @ 9000 rpm. The full fairing version was not available in Germany. 27 machines of this model were made.

=== Hansen & Schneider special models ===
	900 S Arturo Magni Cento Valli	1000 S Corona	1100 Grand Prix	1000 Agostini
Production	1977–1978	1978–1982	1978–1982	1979–1980
Capacity	892 cc	954 cc	1066 cc	954 cc
Bore/Stroke	70 × 58 mm	70 × 62 mm	74 × 62 mm	70 × 62 mm
Power	104 bhp (78 kW) @ 10,000 rpm	106 bhp (79 kW) @ 10,000 rpm	118 bhp (88 kW) @ 10,200 rpm	99 bhp (74 kW) @ 10,200 rpm
Secondary drive	Shaft	Shaft	Shaft	Chain
Wheelbase	1420 mm	1390 mm	1450 mm	1450 mm
Maximum speed	235 km/h (146 mph)	230 km/h (140 mph)	237 km/h (147 mph)	230 km/h (140 mph)
Production quantity	10	12	6	4

The importer for Germany, Hansen GmbH in Baden-Baden, arranged the production of special models in 1976 with the consent of the factory. These were "luxury sports machines", and the impression was created that these motorcycles were made more as a kind of hobby than commercial reasons. The displacement was increased over the factory 837 cc. At the same time, the crankshaft was changed, Mahle pistons and sportier camshafts were fitted.

The standard suspension (steering head angle 63 degrees, caster 110 mm) with Ceriani fork front (125 mm travel) and Sebac gas struts rear (70 mm travel) were retained. Only the 1000 Agostini got the Magni frame and was thus nearly 20 kg lighter than a comparable production model. The new models which were officially offered only in Germany, but were available worldwide through Hansen, were:

- 900 S Arturo Magni Cento Valli - The engine was bored and stroked from the 750 Sport America engine to increase capacity to 892 cc.
- 1000 S Corona - The engine stroke was further increased to give a 954 cc capacity.
- 1100 Grand Prix - The bore was increased by 4 mm to give a 1066 cc capacity. This larger bore required a new cylinder block.
- 1000 Agostini - 954 cc capacity. Fitted with chain rear drive

=== Magni special models ===
	Magni 832	Magni 861
Production	1978–	1978–
Capacity	837 cc	861 cc
Bore/Stroke	69 x 56 mm	70 x 56 mm
Power	88.5 bhp (66.0 kW)	95 bhp (71 kW) @ 10,000 rpm
Secondary drive	Chain	Chain
Maximum speed in km/h	225 km/h (140 mph)	230 km/h (140 mph)

Arturo Magni, former race director of MV Agusta, independently developed motorcycles from the existing MV engines. The Magni kit consisted of an 11 kg lightweight frame, which was based that used on the F750 S Imola racer, electronic ignition and 30 or 32 mm PHF carburetors. The models use a chain for the final drive rather than the more usual shaft drive. Two Magni models were first produced in 1978:

- Magni 832 (Also known as the Magni 850) - engine from the MV Agusta 850 SS Monza.
- Magni 861 - Bore increased by 1 mm to 70 mm, to give 861 cc capacity.

Magni still produce their models to special order.

== End of production ==
With the departure of MV Agusta from racing in 1976, the production of the street models were reduced. Although prototypes were developed until 1977, they were not implemented due to the financial situation of the company - MV made little profit from motorcycles. The production of the model MV Agusta 750 S America was maintained until 1978. The last of the 540 machines made were sold officially 1980. A total of 1276 four-cylinder machines were produced from 1966 to 1980.

== Gallery ==
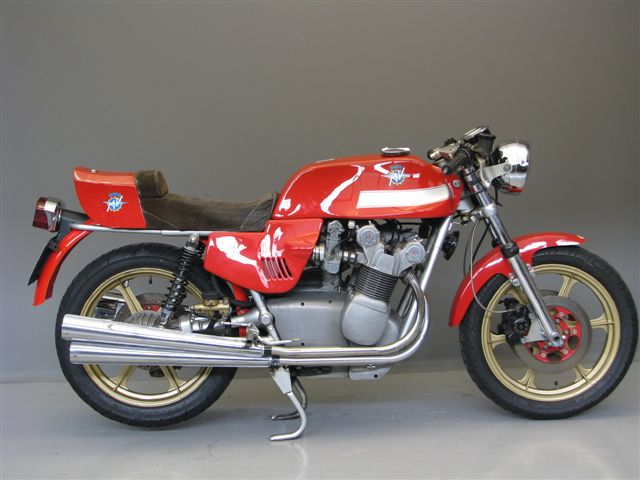
1977 MV Agusta 750 S America

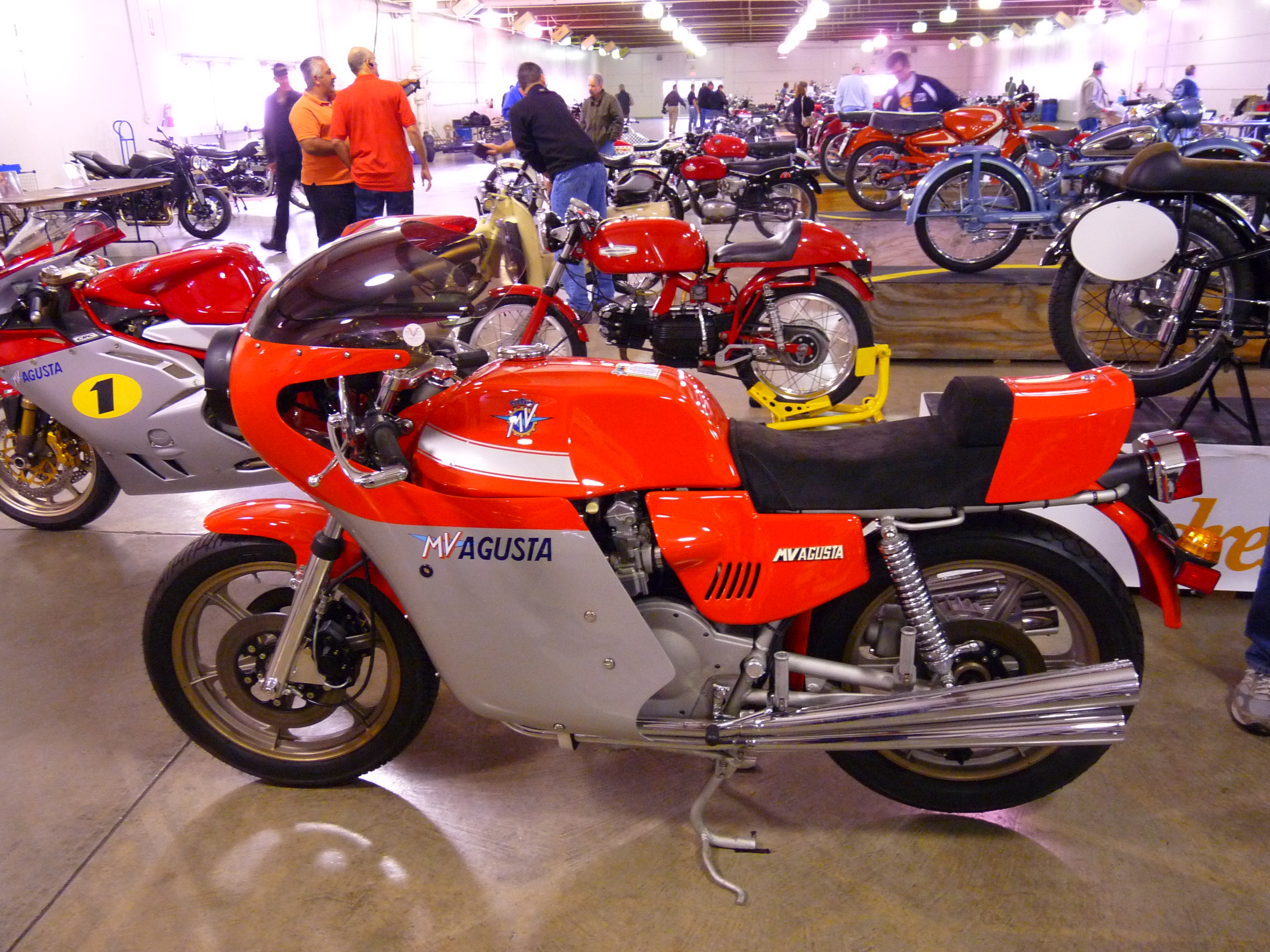
1977 MV Agusta 750 S America with fairing

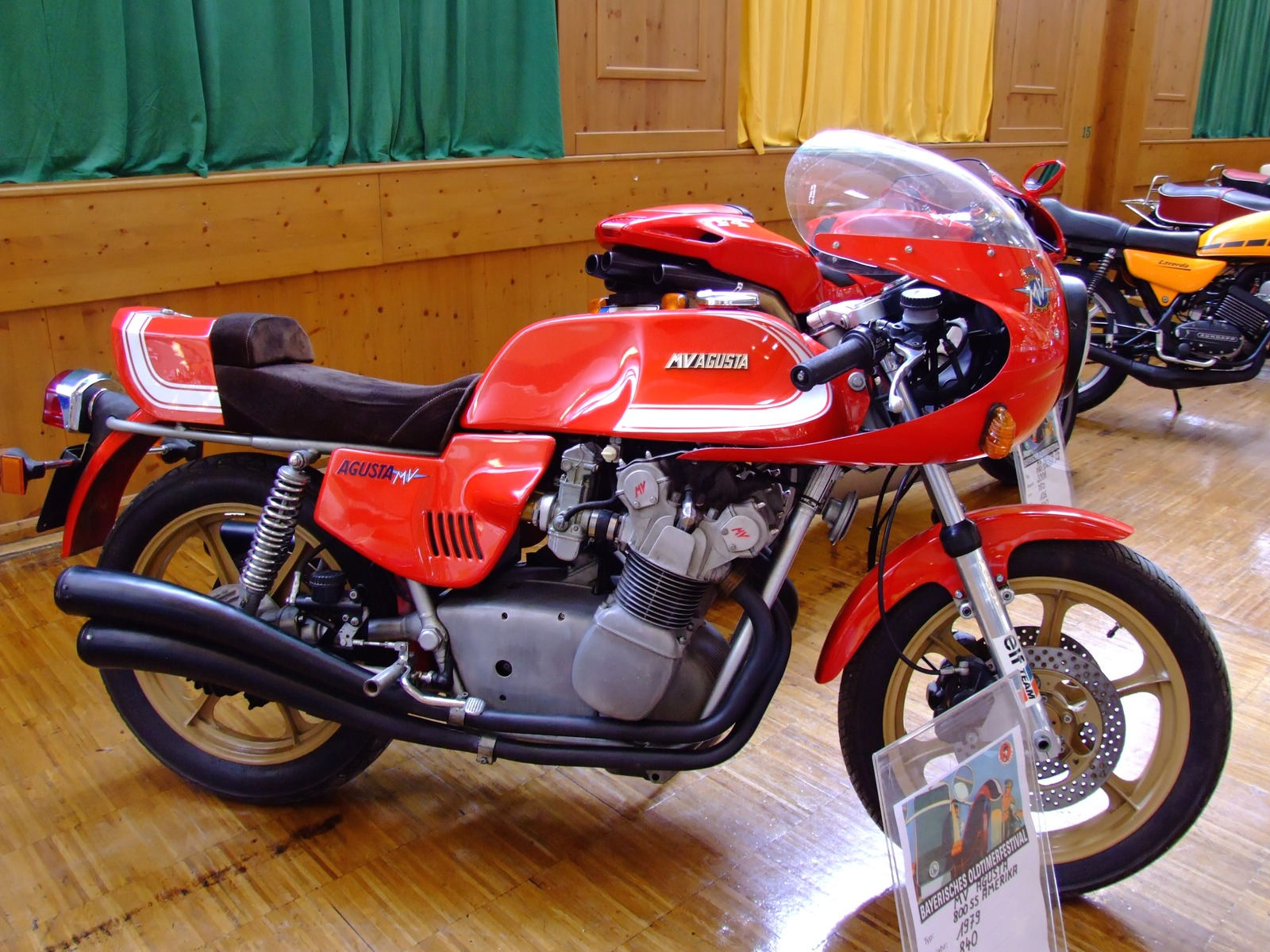
MV Agusta 800 SS Super Daytona America

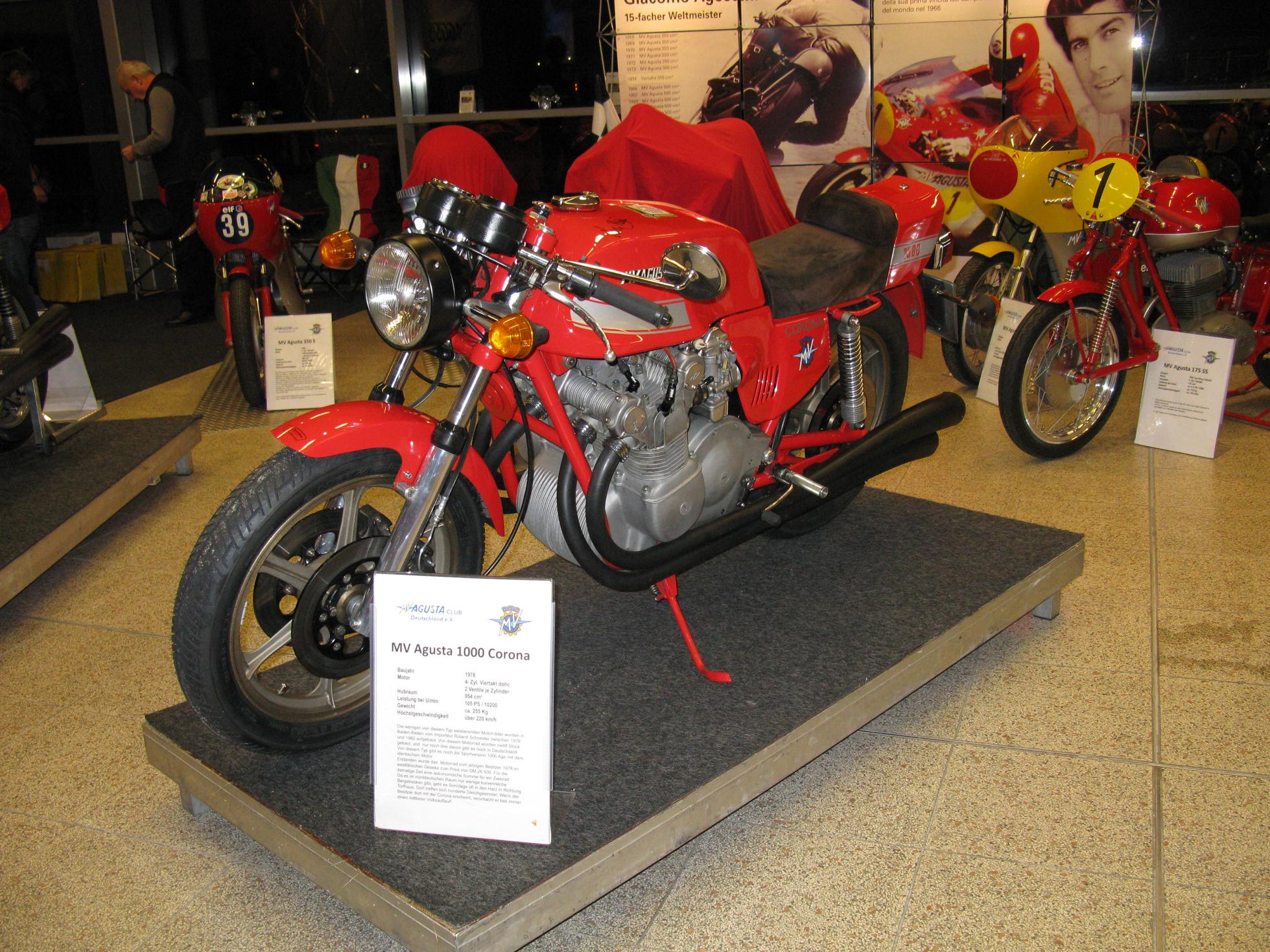
1978 MV Agusta 1000 Corona

== Bibliography ==
- "Classics - 1975 MV Agusta 750 Sport America". American Motorcyclist. American Motorcyclist Assoc. June 2001. ISSN 0277-9358.
- Colombo, Mario; Grizzi, Otto; Patrignani, Roberto (2016). MV Agusta: From 1945 to the present. Giorgio Nada Editore Srl. ISBN 9788879116176.
- Falloon, Ian (2011). The Book of the Classic MV Agusta Fours. Veloce Publishing Ltd. ISBN 9781845842031.
- Gingerelli, Dain; Michels, James; Everitt, Charles (2011). 365 Motorcycles You Must Ride. Motorbooks. ISBN 9780760334744.
- Schwab, Ulrich (1987). Motorräder : 1970-1987; Typen, Daten u. Preise in Deutschland (in German) (1. Aufl ed.). Motorbuch-Verlag. ISBN 9783613011724.
- Tragatsch, Erwin (2000). Berühmte Motorräder (in German) (Spezialausg ed.). Motorbuch-Verl. ISBN 9783613020382.
