= MV Agusta 500 Four =

Racing motorcycle manufactured by MV Agusta

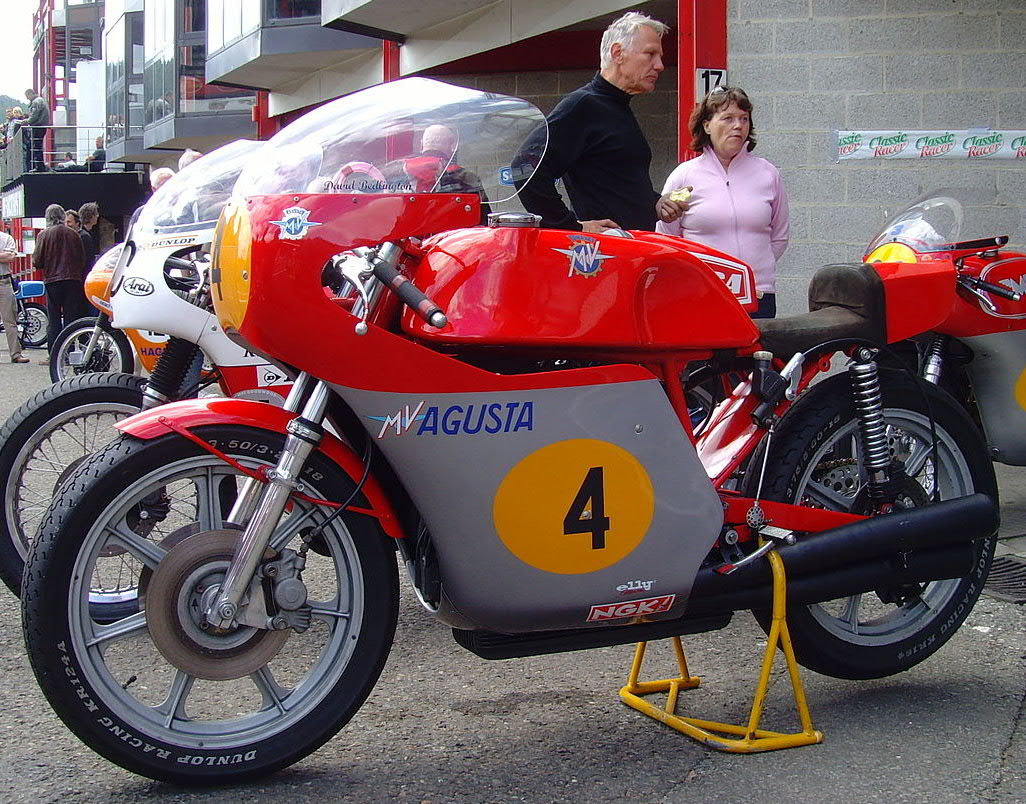
- Phil Read's 1974 MV Agusta 500 Four
- Manufacturer: MV Agusta
- Production: 1973–1976
- Predecessor: MV Agusta 500 Three
- Successor: None
- Class: Racer
- Engine: 500 cc

The MV Agusta 500 four-cylinder (1973–1976) was a racing motorcycle manufactured by the Italian company MV Agusta, for competing in the 500 cc series, the premier class of the FIM World Motorcycle Championship. With this motorcycle MV Agusta won the 1973 constructor's world champion and Phil Read won the 1973 and 1974 500 cc riders world championships.

== Development and Technology ==
MV Agusta's famous racing machine, the three-cylinder or Tre, had powered Giacomo Agostini to the world champion every year from 1966 to 1972. In the 1972 season, the Tre was only just powerful enough to beat the newly created competition of two-stroke motorcycles from Yamaha and Suzuki. For the 1973 season, the existing 350 cc four-cylinder was bored to 433 cc, which could reach higher engine speeds than the three-cylinder. The new engine produced 88 bhp (66 kW) at 14,000 rpm.

This almost matched the performance of the old Tre, which had reached the limit of its development. Arturo Magni, race director and chief engineer at MV, failed to achieve the necessary reliability with the smaller, lighter engine. The helicopter division of Agusta under Dr. Bocchi, who had previously developed twelve-cylinder engines for Lamborghini and Ferrari, was asked for help. Bocchi continued to develop the engine. The camshaft was driven via gears, previously on the side of the cylinder block, was now arranged between cylinders 2 and 3 as in the previous engines. The four-cylinder had a width of 40 cm and a dry weight of 55 kg. The light metal cylinders were cast in a single block. The one piece cast cylinder head had pent-roof shaped combustion chambers. The two inlet valves were 20.5 mm and two outlet valves 16 mm diameter. The valves were operated by bucket tappets and closed with double nested coil springs, the valve angle was 55 degrees. Bore was increased to 58 mm and stroke to 47 mm to give a 497 cc displacement.

=== Technical data ===
MV Agusta 500 4C	1973-1974	1974	1975	1976
Valvetrain	DOHC with four valves per cylinder			
Engine configuration	Four-stroke transverse in-line four-cylinder engine			
Engine cooling	Air cooling			
Bore	56 mm	58 mm		
Stroke	44 mm	47 mm		
Engine displacement	433 c	497 cc		
Lubrication system	Wet sump			
Carburetors	4 × Dell'Orto 31 or 32 mm (depending on circuit)			
Max Power	80 bhp (60 kW) @ 14.000 rpm	92 bhp (69 kW) @ 14.000 rpm	102 bhp (76 kW) @ 14.000 rpm	98 bhp (73 kW) @ 14.000 rpm
Top speed	285 km/h (177 mph)		Unknown	290 km/h (180 mph)
Primary drive	Gears			
Clutch	Dry multi-plate			
Gears	6			
Final drive	Chain drive			
Frame	Double cradle			
Front forks	Telescopic forks			
Rear forks	Swingarm			
Rear suspension	Coil springs with hydraulic shock absorbers			
Brakes	Disc brakes			

== Racing history ==
=== 1973 ===
The new four-cylinder was introduced in 1973, but the machine was unreliable, so that the three-cylinder machine was often used. Initially, the four-cylinder had a single front disc and spoked wheels. A 3.00-18 front tire was used, and, depending on circuit, a 3.25, 3.50 or 3.75-18 rear tyre. It was a difficult year for MV Agusta and especially so for Giacomo Agostini. They had attracted Phil Read as "second driver", but he did not accept a supporting role. Moreover, the four-cylinder two-stroke Yamaha TZ 500 appeared, on which Jarno Saarinen won the first two GPs. Agostini still trusted the three-cylinder, but in the first race he was beaten by Read on the four-cylinder. In the GP of Germany, Read won after Saarinen, Kanaya (both Yamaha) and Agostini had dropped out. After the fatal accident in Monza, where Saarinen and Renzo Pasolini died, the 500 cc race was cancelled and Yamaha withdrew for the remainder of the season. As previously agreed, the top riders stayed away from the Isle of Man TT, meaning the next race would be in Yugoslavia. However, due to a controversial decision by team leader Magni, the MV drivers were not allowed to drive. He was not convinced of the safety of the track, which was approved by a delegation of four drivers, including Agostini. In the TT of Assen, Agostini dropped out again and Read won. Agostini won in Belgium and Czechoslovakia, but Read still had a comfortable lead in points and Ago was behind Kim Newcombe and Jack Findlay in the rankings. Read became the world champion at the Grand Prix of Sweden. He had driven the new four-cylinder for most of the season. Agostini was third in the World Motorcycle Championship.

=== 1974 ===
After the surprising departure of Agostini to Yamaha (he felt with Read in the team he was no longer the No 1 rider), Gianfranco Bonera joined Phil Read at MV. Bonera, however, was primarily engaged to win the Italian championship title. The four-cylinder was a now a considerable improvement on the three-cylinder, but in 1974 there was much more competition. Yamaha now had the updated YZR 500 factory racer, but a whole fleet of TZ 500 production racers also appeared. In addition, Barry Sheene, Paul Smart and Jack Findlay launched the new Suzuki RG 500. Agostini had switched to Yamaha. Both Read and Bonera were unhappy with the bike's chassis. A central rear suspension was tried along with new Ceriani forks. A 4.50-18 rear wheel slick was experimented with. Probably no other racing model by MV Agusta has been modified so frequently. MV Agusta stopped the 350cc class early in the season, allowing them to concentrate fully on the 500cc class. In the season opening French GP, for the first time in years, there was a battle between three brands, which was won by Phil Read after Agostini dropped out. The top drivers boycott the Grand Prix of Germany. In Assen, three brands were on the first row: Yamaha (Teuvo Länsivuori and Giacomo Agostini), MV Agusta (Phil Read) and Suzuki (Barry Sheene). Agostini won this race, but in Belgium he was again second behind Read. There he drove the new YZR 500, but the MV Agusta was also new and finally had a full 500cc engine. Due to falls in Sweden, Agostini and Sheene lost their chance for the world title. Phil Read came second there, but his win at the Grand Prix of Finland clinched the world title for MV Agusta again. Bonera finished second in the final ranking of the world championship.

A decision of the FIM to reduce the sound volume of the racing machines in the future to 113 dB(A), would be particularly problematic for the four-stroke MV Agusta. Two-stroke were easier to dampen without sacrificing performance with a revision to the expansion chamber. The four-cylinder MV Agusta was measured at between 125 and 130 dB(A) on unrestricted exhaust pipes. Read and Agostini drove with earplugs to endure the noise.

=== 1975 ===
Although they had obtained the first two places in the previous year's world championship, the opposition for the MV Agustas was becoming stronger. The FIM had committed to long races. The two-stroke machines had to make fuel stops or mount larger, heavier tanks which favored the MV Agusta four-stroke. Read was not at all satisfied with the handling of the four-cylinder machine. A tubular frame was installed instead of the old demountable double loop frame to achieve higher chassis stability. A wider swingarm was also used to allow a slick tire on the rear. Gianfranco Bonera broke a leg during the preseason and had to be replaced by Armando Toracca. Giacomo Agostini, sought rapprochement with the MV team, but was still employed by Yamaha. Toracca disliked "second driver" status and forced Read to fight for third place in the opening race, causing them to lose a lot of time to Agostini and Kanaya with their Yamahas. In Austria, Read was only third behind Kanaya and Länsivuori (Suzuki). On the Hockenheim circuit, pure speed was important and as a result Read was able to compete with Agostini, but Agostini won. In Imola, Read had no chance against Agostini and in Assen he was only third. In Belgium, another speed circuit, Read won. Moreover, Agostini dropped out, as did the now fit Bonera and Barry Sheene. Read became second behind Sheene in Sweden but dropped out in Finland, the first technical failure for MV that season. As a result, the world title battle was still open at the start of the last GP (Czechoslovakia). Agostini had to make a fuel stop and Read won the race, but Agostini's second place was enough for him to clinch the world title, the first time on a two-stroke machine in the 500cc class.

=== 1976 ===
In 1976, Agostini returned to MV Agusta, as Yamaha officially retired from racing in late 1975; Read, previously No. 1 rider at MV, switched to Suzuki. Agostini did not have a usual factory contract, the MV Agustas were delivered to the "Marlboro-Api Racing Team", but with the entire team of factory engineers support at races. The FIM introduced the new noise limit of 113 dB(A) and the MV was fitted with a redesigned cylinder head and mufflers to meet the limit.

The beginning of the season was disappointing for MV and Agostini, and not once did Agostini make it onto the podium. The two-stroke Suzuki were superior in performance and now so stable that Barry Sheene was undisputed champion. The season started so poorly that Agostini used a Suzuki RG 500 after the second race. Only in the last race of the season, on August 29, 1976, at the Nürburgring-Nordschleife in Germany, did the MV Agusta appear again, now equipped with lighter pistons and a lighter crankshaft. Agostini won the race with it, in difficult conditions, finishing 52 seconds ahead of second placed Marco Lucchinelli on a Suzuki, after 7 laps. This was the last 500 cc GP race victory by a four-stroke in direct comparison to two-stroke racing engines.

=== Withdrawal from racing ===
After the last race at the Nürburgring, MV Agusta officially retired from motorsport. After 30 years of motorsport, the new majority shareholder did not want to invest more money in the racing department of the financially troubled company. A four-cylinder boxer engine with water cooling mounted with the crankshaft sitting transversely in the frame and the engine casing as a load bearing element was in development, but never progressed beyond a prototype. In 1978 Cagiva unsuccessfully tried to purchase the MV Augusta racers as the basis for their own racing team.

== Bibliography ==
- Colombo, Mario; Patrignani, Roberto (2000). MV Agusta (in German) (Aufl ed.). Motorbuch-Verl. ISBN 978-3613014169.
- Rauch, Siegfried (1980). Berühmte Rennmotorräder : 150 alte u. neue Rennmaschinen für d. Grand-Prix-Einsatz (in German) (Aufl ed.). Motorbuch-Verlag. ISBN 3-87943-590-1.
- Rauch, Volker (1975). Motorrad-Weltmeisterschaft '75 (in German) (Aufl ed.). Motorbuch-Verlag. ISBN 9783879433896.
- Spahn, Christian (1986). MV Agusta : Technik und Geschichte der Rennmotorräder (in German) (Aufl ed.). SERAG-AG, Verl.-Unternehmen. ISBN 978-3908007135.
- Walker, Mick (1998). Mick Walker's Italian Racing Motorcycles. Redline Books. ISBN 9780953131112.
