= MV Agusta 750 S =

Motorcycle manufactured by the company MV Agusta from 1970 to 1975

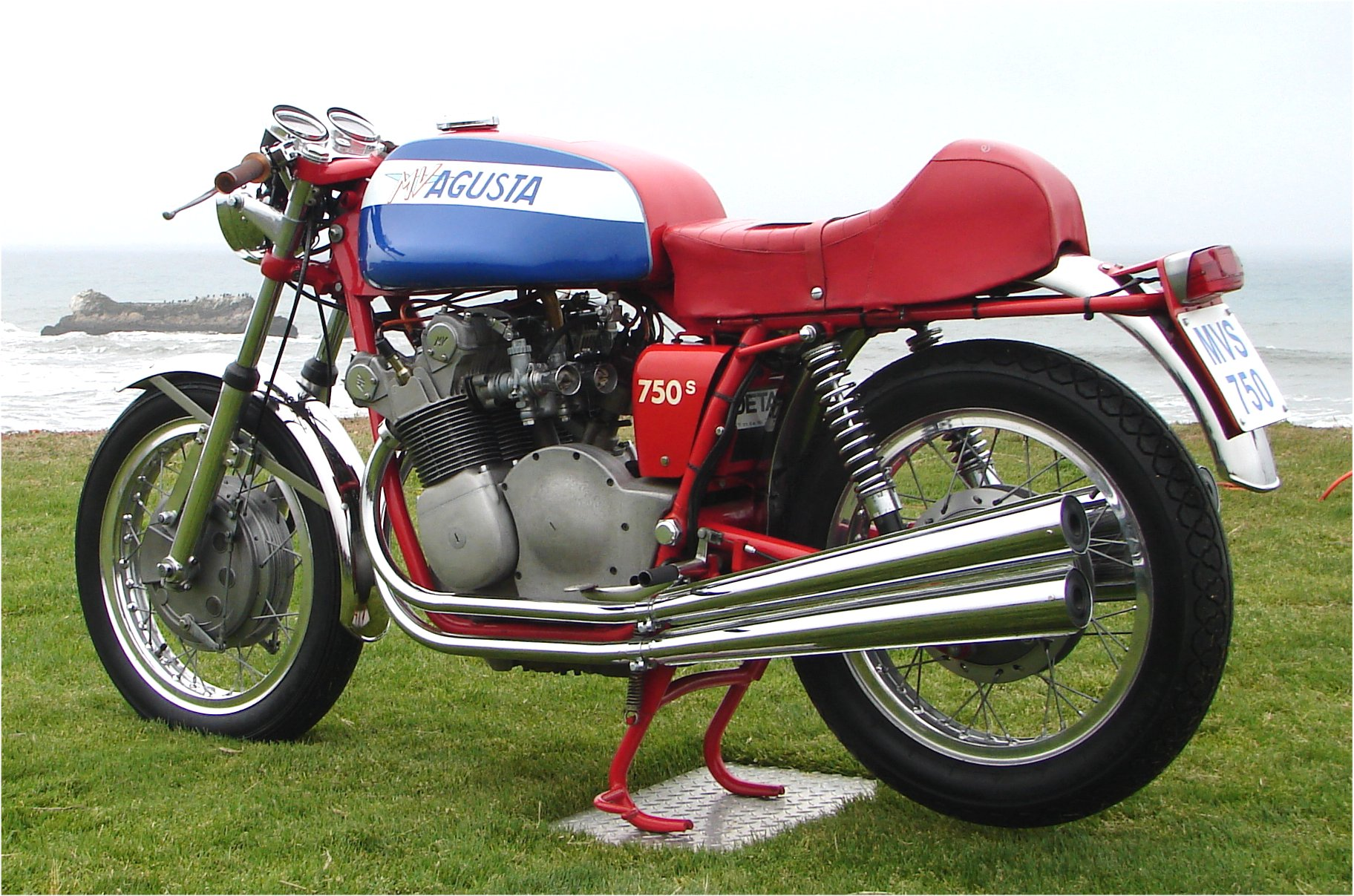
- MV Agusta 750 S
- Manufacturer: MV Agusta
- Also called: MV Agusta 750 Sport
- Production: 1970 to 1975
- Predecessor: MV Agusta 600
- Successor: MV Agusta 750 Sport America
- Class: Sport bike
- Engine: 743.3 cc (45 cu in) 4 cylinder DOHC; Four 24mm Dell'Orto carburetors
- Bore / stroke: 65 mm × 56 mm (2.6 in × 2.2 in)
- Compression ratio: 10:1
- Top speed: 200 km/h (120 mph)
- Power: 72 bhp (54 kW) @ 9,200 rpm
- Ignition type: Coil
- Transmission: 5-speed cassette gearbox Shaft drive
- Frame type: Half-duplex cradle
- Suspension: Front: Ceriani Teledraulic fork Rear: Swingarm with BREV hydraulic dampers
- Brakes: Front: Duo-duplex drum brake 230 x 30 mm Rear: 200 mm drum brake
- Tires: Front: 3.50 x 18; Rear: 400 x 18
- Wheelbase: 1,390 mm
- Dimensions: L: 2,105 mm W: 750 mm H: 1,020 mm
- Seat height: 800 mm
- Weight: 235 kg (dry)
- Fuel capacity: 24 l

The MV Agusta 750 S also known as the MV Agusta 750 Sport, is a motorcycle that was manufactured by the MV Agusta company from 1970 to 1975. Production total of this model series was 583 machines.

== Development ==
The previous model, the MV Agusta 600, was designed as a touring machine but was not a great success. Its replacement, the 750 S, was designed as a sport bike, reflecting the racing heritage of the company. The four-cylinder engine had its capacity expanded to 750cc by increasing the bore, the exhaust system was upgraded and the seat, tank and handlebars were changed to more sporting items.

== Technical data ==
The core of the engine is formed by the crankcase rack. The crankshaft, cylinder and cylinder head assembly are mounted on it. The rack takes the nine-piece crankshaft in six bearing blocks, as well as the spur gears in the control tower for the double camshaft drive. After loosening twelve nuts, the units mounted on the rack can be lifted out. It features fine ribbing of the cooling fins of the sump as well as the oversized cylinder head caused by the double camshaft drive. The transversely mounted cassette transmission is driven from the engine by helical gears. It is connected to the shaft drive to the rear wheel via a spiral bevel gear angle drive. The gear change is on the right side, the first gear is up, all other gears are engaged by a downwards push of the lever. In contrast to the previous 600 model, the 750 uses a double sided, twin leading shoe drum brake on the front and a single leading shoe on the rear. The front brake was changed to hydraulic dual-discs in 1974.

== Model Variants ==
Two model variants were available based on the MV Agusta 750 S:

- MV Agusta GT (1972–74): A reduced-power version (69 bhp (51 kW) @ 8450 rpm), which was available in white bronze with touring handlebars. A total of 33 of the GT model were made.
- MV Agusta SS (1971–75) (also known in Germany as MV Agusta SS Daytona): An uprated variant (76 bhp (57 kW) @ 9,900 rpm) with full fairing.
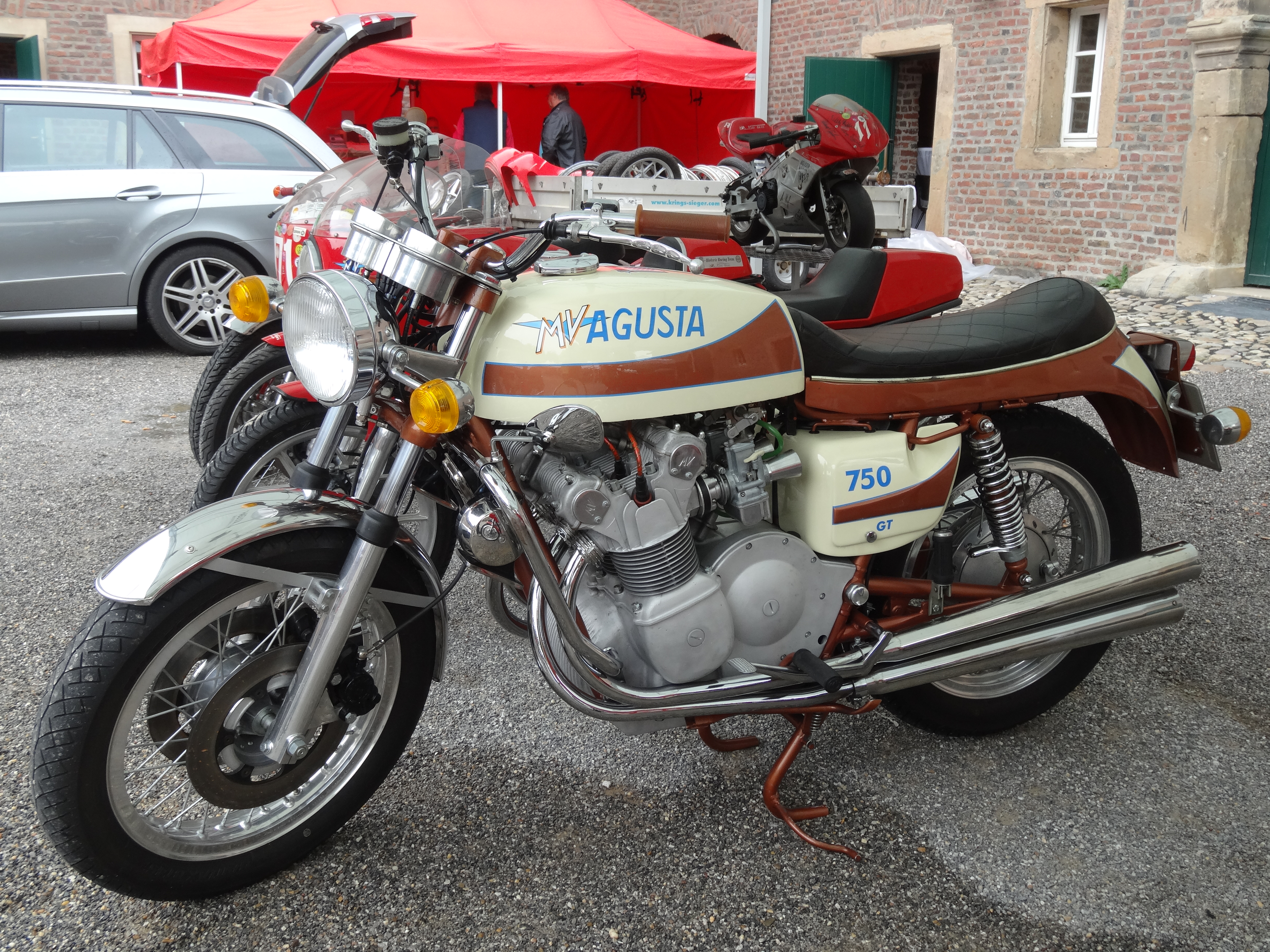
MV Agusta 750 GT

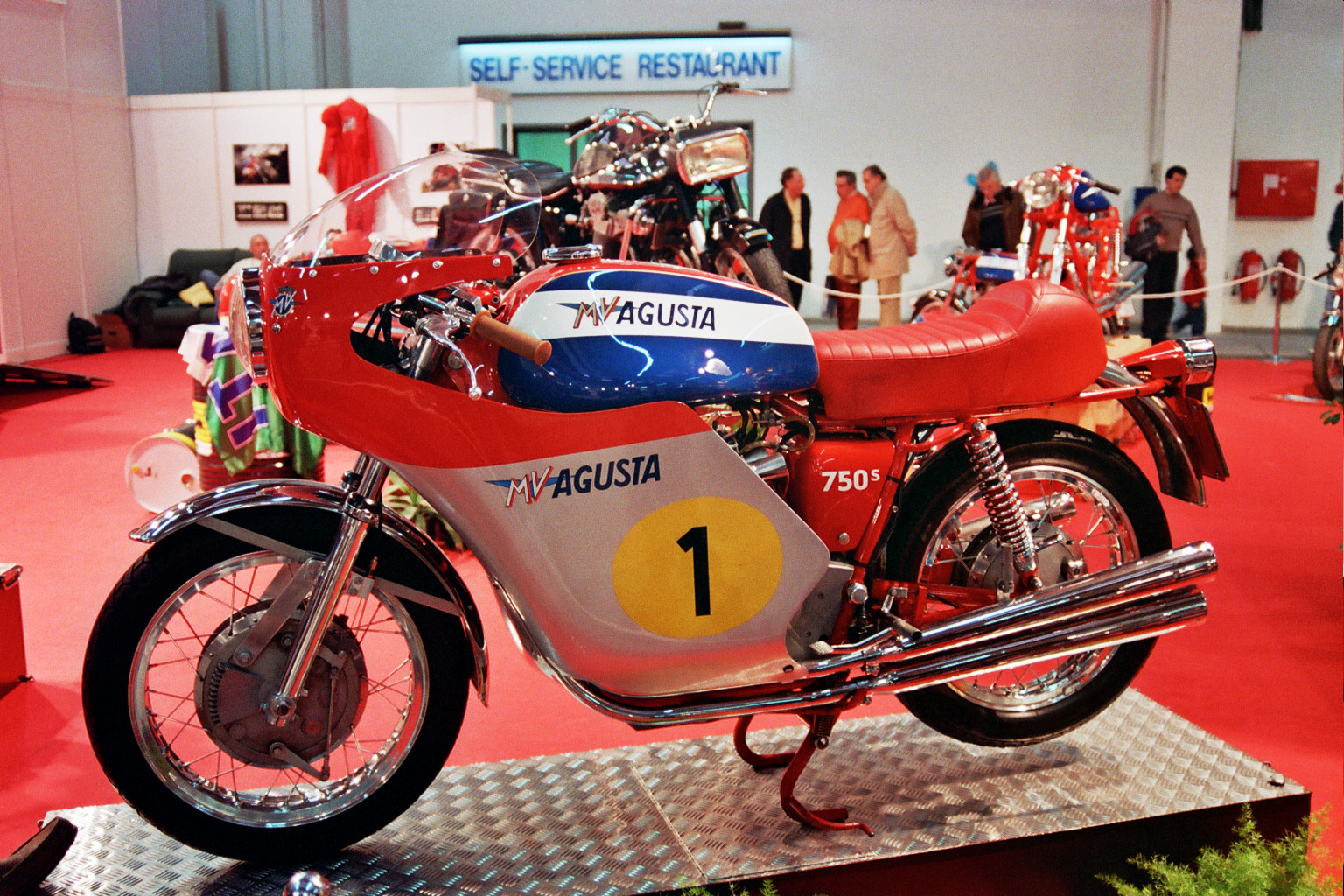
MV Agusta 750 SS

=== F750 S Imola ===
Two machines were modified to Formula 750 racing specification for Giacomo Agostini and Nello Pagani to ride in the 1972 Imola 200. Arturo Magni, head of the racing department, modified the engines to produce 85 bhp at 9000 rpm. A frame that Magni had designed for a possible new 750 road model was used. Many of the cycle parts from the 500 racers were used: Ceriani forks and brakes, Borrani rims etc., bringing the weight of the machine down to 190 kg.

Due to technical problems, Pagani did not start the race. Agostini got a good start and started to build a lead, but on lap 5 he was overtaken by Paul Smart on the works Ducati. On lap 40, Agostini retired with technical problems.

== Exclusivity ==
Following Japanese domination of the motorcycle world market from around 1970, British and Italian motorcycle manufacturers began to run into financial difficulties. Their prices were relatively high, the manufactured quantities remained low and accordingly few motorcycle manufacturers survived in Europe. Contemporary MV Agusta 750 S and its follow-up models of this series have achieved high exclusitivity because of the low production levels and the racing achievements of MV Agusta. Most machines have been restored at enormous financial expense and remain mostly in collector's hands. When one of these rarities reaches the used vehicle market, very high prices are achieved.

== Bibliography ==
- Colombo, Mario; Grizzi, Otto; Patrignani, Roberto (2016). MV Agusta: From 1945 to the present. Giorgio Nada Editore Srl. ISBN 9788879116176.
- Falloon, Ian (2011). The Book of the Classic MV Agusta Fours. Veloce Publishing Ltd. ISBN 9781845842031.
- Lichter, Michael; d'Orleans, Paul (2014). Cafe Racers: Speed, Style, and Ton-Up Culture. Motorbooks. ISBN 9780760345825.
- Schwab, Ulrich (1987). Motorräder : 1970-1987; Typen, Daten u. Preise in Deutschland (in German) (1. Aufl ed.). Motorbuch-Verlag. ISBN 9783613011724.
