= Arturo Magni =

Italian motorcycle racing team manager

- Born: 24 September 1925; Usmate Velate, Lombardy, Italy
- Died: 2 December 2015 (aged 90); Samarate, Lombardy, Italy
- Occupations: engineer, entrepreneur racing team manager

Arturo Magni (Usmate Velate, 24 September 1925 - Samarate, 2 December 2015) was an Italian engineer racing team manager and entrepreneur.

== Early life ==
Arturo Magni was born in Usmate Velate, near Milan in the Lombardy region of Italy on 24 September 1925. His main passion was for model aeroplanes, where he showed great technical creativeness in building them. He built life-size gliders, which he flew himself, and won the 1938 Italian Gliding Championship.

After leaving school, he worked for his father for a while and then joined the aviation industry, working for the Italian manufacturer Bestetti.

== Gilera ==
The story of Arturo Magni in the world of two wheels began in 1947 when he joined Gilera. The company had decided to participate in the 500 cc World Championship and had commissioned Pietro Remor to build a new four-cylinder GP engine. Remor was impressed by Magni's talents, and at Remor's insistence, Magni joined the R&D departement to assist in building the new engine. This engine powered Gilera to six world titles in the 500 class with the riders Umberto Masetti, Libero Liberati and Geoff Duke.

== MV Agusta ==
Count Domenico Agusta was determined to make MV Agusta one of the leading motorcycle marques. In 1950 Augusta hired Pietro Remor to build two GP machines: a four-cylinder 500 cc and a DOHC 125 cc. To assist him in this project, Remor brought Magni with him from Gilera as chief mechanic. Soon Magni became Direttore Sportivo (director of the racing department) under the watchful eye of the Count.

His technical expertise was fundamental in developing the world-beating 350 and 500 cc "Threes" in the 1960s and the "Fours" in the 1970s.

Magni held this position until the marque withdrew from competition in 1976. He had employed riders such as Giacomo Agostini, John Surtees, Carlo Ubbiali, Phil Read, Mike Hailwood, Cecil Sandford and Tarquinio Provini. The Varese-based company, under Magni's guidance, won a total of 75 world titles (37 manufacturers and 38 riders).

After the withdrawal from racing, Magni stayed on at MV as superintendent of the MV Agusta museum.

== Cagiva ==
In 1980, Magni was head of the race shop at Cagiva. He was in charge of development of a new four-cylinder racing two-stroke. The engine, which was a development of the Yamaha TZ 500 engine, was first used by Virginio Ferrari the 1980 German motorcycle Grand Prix at the Nürburgring.

== Motorcycle manufacturer ==
From 1977 he began his career as an entrepreneur founding the house that bears his name, along with his two sons. The company, based in a small but fully equipped workshop, was located at Samarate, 20 miles from the MV factory. Initial the company manufactured special parts for the MV Agusta 750 S motorcycles, such as chain drive conversions, big-bore kits and frame kits. Later, in 1980, the company progressed to the construction of complete motorcycles. The first models were power by Honda CB900F engines (models MH1 & MH2). Later BMW R100 (MB1 & MB2) and various Moto Guzzi engines were used. The Sfida 1000 model, introduced in 1989, used a Moto Guzzi engine in a machine styled to reflect the MV racers of the 1960s. (Sfida means "challenge" in Italian). In 1999, models based on the four-cylinder Suzuki Bandit 1200 engine were added.
