= MV Agusta 500 Three =

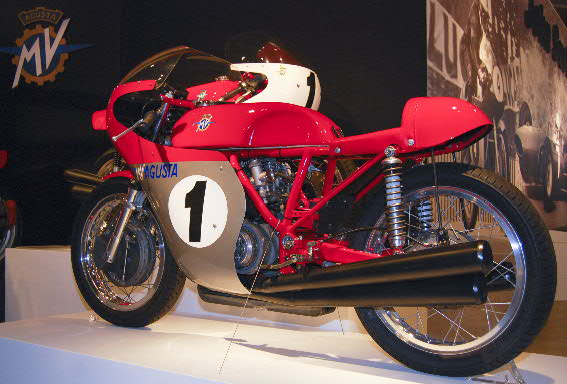
- Manufacturer: MV Agusta
- Also called: MV Agusta 500 Tre
- Production: 1965–1973
- Predecessor: 350 4C
- Successor: 500 Four
- Class: 500cc
- Engine: 498 cc (30 cu in) Four stroke Inline three cylinder
- Bore / stroke: 62 mm × 55 mm (2.4 in × 2.2 in)
- Compression ratio: 11:1
- Top speed: 162 mph (261 km/h)
- Power: 84 hp (63 kW; 85 PS) @ 13,500 rpm
- Transmission: Unit Construction 7-speed
- Frame type: Full duplex cradle
- Suspension: Front: teledraulic fork Rear: Swingarm with hydraulic dampers
- Brakes: Front: Central Drum quad-cam 240 mm Rear: Twin-cam 230 mm
- Tires: Front: 3.00 x 18; Rear: 3.25 x 18
- Wheelbase: 1310 mm
- Weight: 118 kg (260 lb) (dry)
- Fuel capacity: 18 Litres

The MV Agusta 500cc Three (1965–1973) or MV Agusta Tre was a road racing motorcycle produced by the Italian manufacturer MV Agusta to compete in the 500 cc Grand Prix motorcycle racing World Championship. The motorcycle was introduced in 1966 to compete against the ever competitive Honda racing machines and was a bored out version of MV Agusta's highly successful 350 cc three cylinder. Giacomo Agostini won consecutive world championships in the 500 cc class with this motorbike from 1966 to 1972. In addition, MV Agusta won the Constructors' World Championships from 1967 to 1972. The MV Agusta Tre is considered the most successful racing motorcycle in history.

== Development and Technology ==
The three-cylinder 500 machine was first raced at the 1966 Dutch TT. The machine was based on the MV Agusta 350 3C that had been used in the previous season (1965). Count Agusta had wanted a 350 cc three-cylinder because he was impressed by the three-cylinder two-stroke DKW RM 350. Arturo Magni and designer Mario Rossi tried to dissuade him, but the count insisted. He even suggested adding an extra cylinder to the MV Agusta 250 Bicilindrica. When the three-cylinder engine seemed ready, Count Agusta was displeased because there were only two valves per cylinder. Within a week the technicians converted the engine to four valves per cylinder and that immediately yielded an extra 6 horsepower. In 1966 a version with the engine enlarged to 420 cc was produced for the 500 cc class. The engine stood out due to the large oil pan and the oil cooler in the streamlined fairing to prevent the engine from overheating. The 420 cc machine was replaced in 1967 by a fully-fledged 500 cc machine. The three-cylinder was replaced in 1973 by a new four-cylinder.

The air-cooled three-cylinder machines were the first MV Agusta engines with four-valve heads. The intake valves had a diameter of 21 mm, the exhaust valves 16.3 mm, the valve angle is 60 degrees. The valves are operated by bucket tappets from two overhead camshafts, which are driven by a spur gear set on the right side of the engine. The connecting rods were offset by 120 degrees on the crankshaft. The machine had six roller main bearings, two of which were located at the end of the crankshaft. Having only an L-shaped oil scraper ring on the piston was unusual for a four-stroke engine. Three 27 mm Dell'Orto carburetors supplied the engine with fuel mixture which was ignited with 10 mm Magneti Marelli spark plugs that received their power from an 8 volt battery ignition.

Both the 500cc and the 350cc Factory race bikes specifications, bore and stroke were veiled in secrecy. When information was leaked, MV Agusta was known to leak disinformation. Over the passing of years, MV race engineers provided information on the 500 cc Three cylinder.

== Race history ==
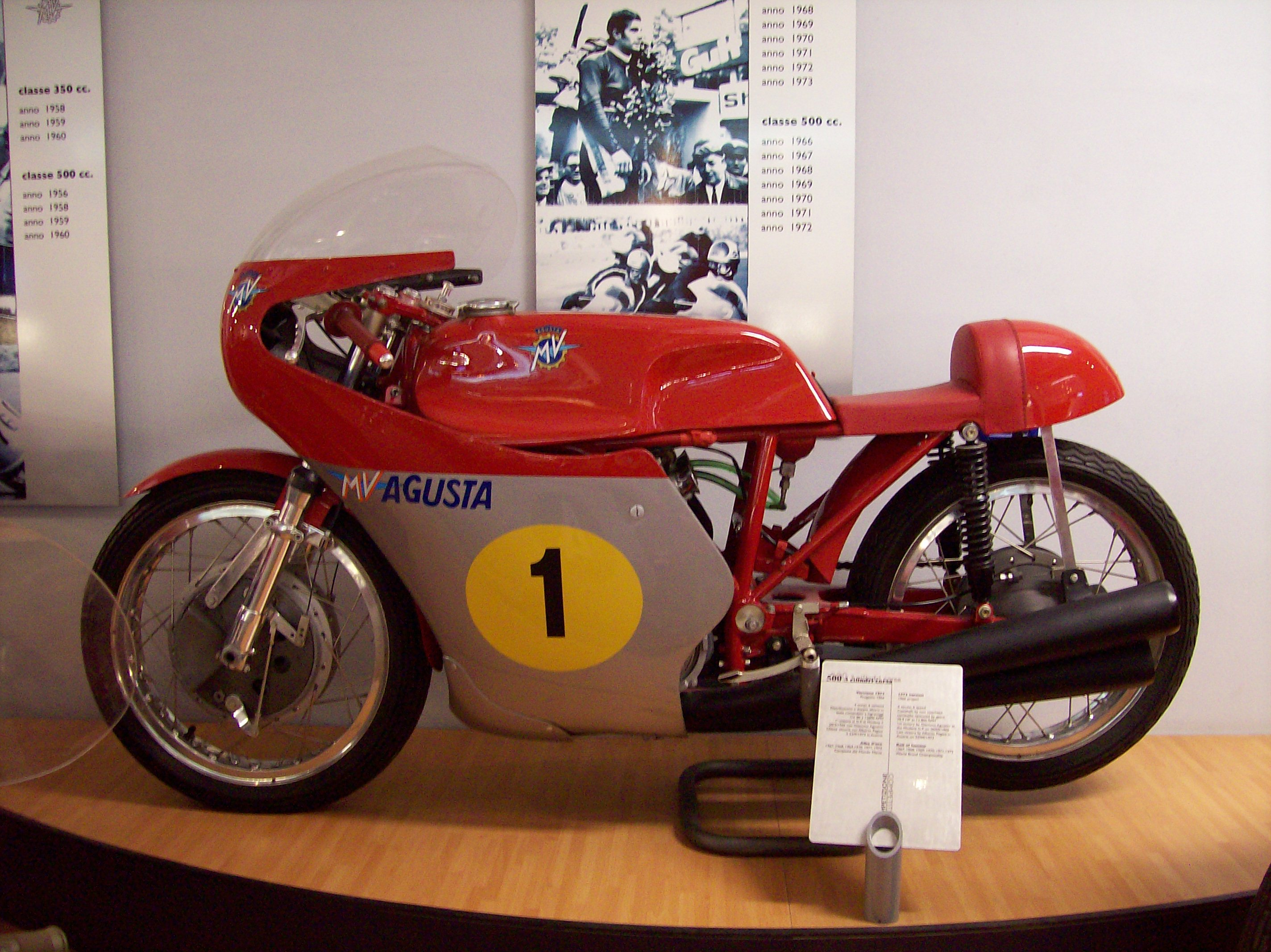
Agostini's 1973 500 Three

Giacomo Agostini rode the 500 Three to seven consecutive 500cc World Championships from 1966 to 1972.

The first use of a Tre (but with 350 cc displacement) at the first round of the 1965 World Championship at the Nürburgring. The young Giacomo Agostini won confidently in front of the old master Mike Hailwood. In the second race of the 1966 season, Agostini rode a 420 Tre in the 500 class, the full 500 cc machine being introduced for the 67 season. After Honda withdrew from racing at the end of 1967, there was no comparable racing team that could have denied MV Agusta the title in the 500cc class; This remained so until 1972. The first races of the 1973 season were driven by Agostini still on his tre, then it was replaced by the more powerful MV Agusta 500 four-cylinder. The 1973 Tre was modified to use front disc brakes from Scarab, but in terms of performance it was inferior to the two-stroke Yamaha.

== Sister model ==
The MV Agusta 350 Tre, developed before the 500s, was no less successful. Giacomo Agostini was 350 cc champion continuously from 1968 to 1973 with this model. In the 1974, MV Agusta did not compete in the 350 cc class, concentrating on winning the half litre class. Technically, both machines were almost identical. The 350 Tre had a 52-bore, a smaller tank and weighed about 3 kg less. The power of the 350 was 65 bhp @ 13,500 rpm in 1972.

== See also ==
- MV Agusta 500 racers

== Bibliography ==
- Colombo, Mario; Patrignani, Roberto (2000). MV Agusta (in German) (Aufl ed.). Motorbuch-Verl. ISBN 978-3613014169.
- Rauch, Siegfried (1980). Berühmte Rennmotorräder (in German) (2nd ed.). Motorbuch. ISBN 978-3879435906.
- Spahn, Christian (1986). MV Agusta : Technik und Geschichte der Rennmotorräder (in German) (Aufl ed.). SERAG-AG, Verl.-Unternehmen. ISBN 978-3908007135.
