= Samarate =

- Comune
- Città di Samarate
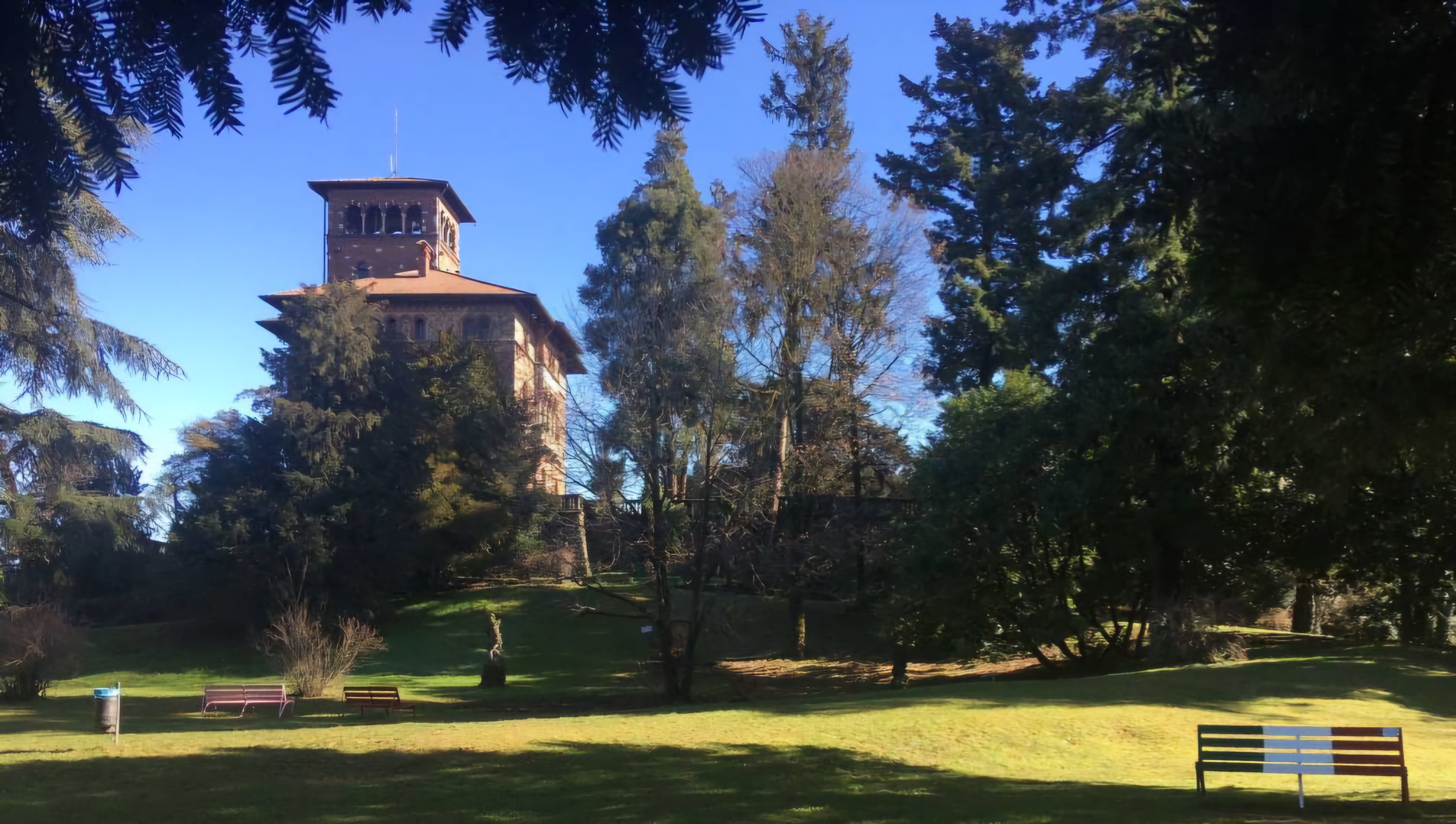

- Coat of arms

- Location within Italy Location within Lombardy
- Coordinates: 45°37′N 08°47′E
- Country: Italy
- Region: Lombardy
- Province: Varese (VA)
- Frazioni: Cascina Costa, Cascina Elisa, San Macario, Verghera

Government
  - Mayor: Alessandro Ferrazzi (Partito Democratico)

Area
  - Total: 15 km^{2} (5.8 sq mi)
- Elevation: 221 m (725 ft)

Population (4 September 2025)
  - Total: 16,172
  - Density: 1,100/km^{2} (2,800/sq mi)
- Demonym: Samaratesi
- Time zone: UTC+1 (CET)
  - Summer (DST): UTC+2 (CEST)
- Postal code: 21017
- Dialing code: 0331
- ISTAT code: 012118
- Patron saint: Saint Rocco
- Saint day: 16 August
- Website: Official website

Samarate is a town and comune (municipality) located in the province of Varese, in the Lombardy region of northern Italy. It received the honorary title of city with a presidential decree on February 2, 2009. The frazione of Cascina Costa houses the headquarters of the former AgustaWestland, merged into Leonardo since 2016, one of the world's largest producers of helicopters.

== History ==
=== The origins ===
The Samarate area has been inhabited since ancient times and the first archaeological evidence dates back to the Iron Age.

Starting from the 7th century BC, the first contacts with the Etruscan civilization took place, a period to which the terracotta patera found in the Samaratese territory dates back, which shows on the external part the proper names of local people in the Celtic-Ligurian alphabet, a mix between the local language and the Etruscan language.

After the Gallo-Celtic period, between the 3rd and 2nd centuries BC, the Samarate area was conquered by the Romans who left several tombs in the town as well as small residential areas.

=== The medieval period ===
The first written document from the territory of Samarate dates back to 973 AD and consists of a parchment (preserved today in the archive of the church of Santa Maria di Novara) which documents the exchange of some goods located between Samarate and Lonate Pozzolo, between Aupaldo, bishop of Novara, and a certain Celso or Celsone of Lonate. Furthermore, in this document the name of Samarate appears for the first time. The etymology of the name seems to be traced back to the cult of the Milanese saints Gervasio and Protasio introduced in Samarate with the construction of the parish church, attributable to the 13th century. The Latin definition precisely of the two saints as sancti martyri ("holy martyrs") could be traced back to the etymology of the name of Samarate, but the other hypothesis can be traced back to the names of the Celtic villages which often, as in this case, ended with -ate.

The influence of Milan from the 12th century became increasingly evident with the conquest of the Samaratese territory by the Viscontis. In the newly formed Milanese state, many Samaratesi excelled in important places, highlighting the important role played by the village. In 1226 Bochino de Samarate was consul in Milan, and in 1233 Engilfredo de Samarate was indicated as consul of justice.

In 1455 the Milanese archbishop Gabriele Sforza went on a pastoral visit to Samarate, reporting for the first time the existence of two churches, the parish church of Saints Gervaso and Protaso and the minor church of San Salvatore.

=== From the dawn of the modern era to the end of the seventeenth century ===
In 1500 the town was hit by the plague, while in 1503 the Swiss mercenaries called by Ludovico il Moro to defend the duchy, after the defeat of the Sforza, began to sack the Samarate area, followed by the devastation carried out by the French and Spanish.

At the end of the sixteenth century, a male and a female monastery was established in Samarate directed by the order of the Humiliati. San Carlo Borromeo honors the village with a visit on two occasions, one in 1570 and one in 1576 where in both cases we can see the fact that the parish church has been moved to the more adequate and modern seat of San Salvatore. In addition to the ancient church of Saints Gervaso and Protaso, the minor chapels of San Rocco, Santa Maria and San Bernardo have been added, as well as the ancient church of Santa Maria di Verghera.

In 1610 it will be the turn of the pastoral visit of Cardinal Federico Borromeo who, during his stop in the town, will allow the erection of an autonomous parish at the Cascina del Manzo.

In 1630 Samarate was also hit by the great wave of plague that brought the Milanese area to its knees and the town managed to recover only starting from the second half of the seventeenth century due to a religious event. In 1673, in fact, the relics of San Macario found in the catacombs of Rome arrived in the parish of Samarate. The urn containing the saint's body was first found in the church of Cascina del Manzo, changing the name of the hamlet to San Macario as it is still known today.

=== From the eighteenth century to the nineteenth century ===
In the eighteenth century, Samarate fell under the Austrian Duchy of Milan and inaugurated the history of the new century under the banner of a series of public works carried out on site. The Arno stream, which for about two centuries had devastated the Samaratese areas with continuous floods and overflows, underwent embankment consolidation works. To do this, between 1766 and 1767 some Renaissance-era locks built south of Gallarate were demolished and the river bed was lowered by about two metres.

In the fervor of reconstructions, in 1760 the parish church of San Salvatore was also restored which, however, due to the ancient structure damaged in several parts, was considered inadequate to support new works and the growing mass of faithful in the city. Therefore the demolition of the structure began and a new church was built, inaugurated in 1779 and dedicated to the Holy Trinity in 1780. The project of the new church, in late Baroque style, was entrusted to Giulio Galliori, former architect of the Milan Cathedral building.

=== The nineteenth century ===
In 1822 the first state boys' school was opened in Samarate and in 1843 a second, girls' school was opened. At the same time, new industries were created in the manufacturing, textile and cotton fields thanks above all to the flourishing cultivation of mulberry trees for the breeding of silkworms and the development of nearby industrial centers such as Busto Arsizio.

Samarate contributed to the history of Italy in those years by sending a small contingent of volunteers to the Five Days of Milan in 1848, led by the engineer Masera. The commitment was renewed in 1859, when the town also equipped itself with its own national guard of 130 volunteer soldiers led by Doctor Ercole Ferrario.

On 7 March 1869 the nearby hamlet of Verghera was merged with the municipality of Samarate and the same city was included in the district of Gallarate, in the province of Milan. In 1887 the parish church was equipped with a monumental bell tower in style.

=== The twentieth century ===
In 1927 Samarate became part of the newly formed province of Varese also by virtue of its economic and social development which has affected the town since the early years of the new century, i.e. the spread of the local mechanical industry.

During the First World War Samarate sacrificed 86 fallen soldiers to the national cause, as well as counting 29 mutilated and war invalids and a total of 8 decorated for valor. In December 1917 in Cascina Costa, in addition to the fighter pilot training camp (on the Nieuport), there was a local Defense Section with 3 pilot sergeants who moved to the 16th Squadron in January 1918.

With the twenty years of fascism the fervor of public works resumed, including the construction of the municipal building in 1936, the local heliotherapy colony, the gym, the Opera Balilla building and the opening of new roads.

== Fractions ==
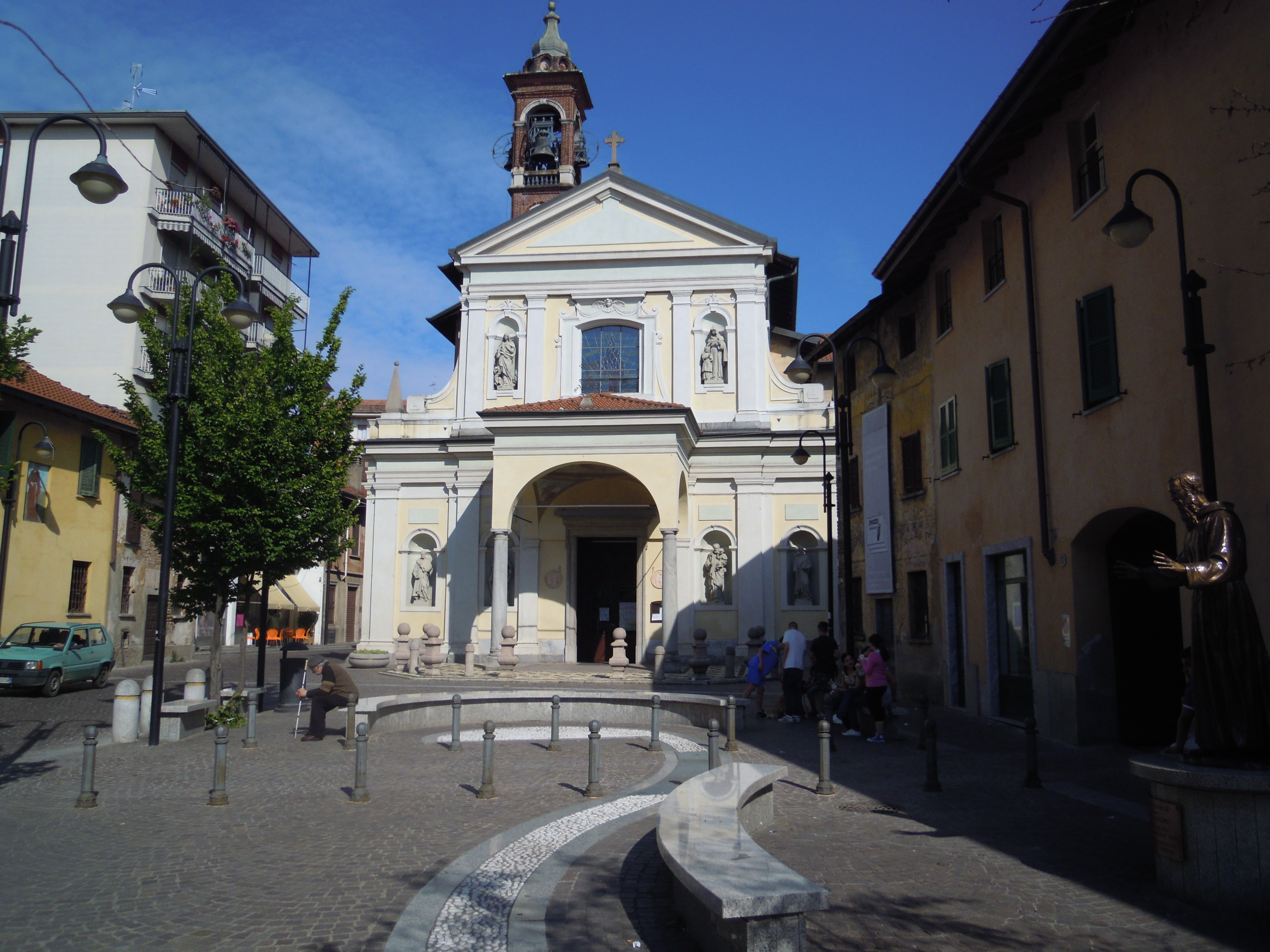
The Frazione of San Macario

- Cascina Costa
- Cascina Elisa
- Cascina Tangitt
- San Macario
- Verghera

== Twin towns ==
- Yeovil, England
