= Ceriani =

Ceriani or Arces
- Industry: Manufacturing
- Founded: Italy (1951)
- Founder: Arturo Ceriani
- Defunct: 1980
- Fate: Dissolved, brand sold to Paioli
- Headquarters: Samarate, Italy
- Products: Motorcycle frames, suspensions

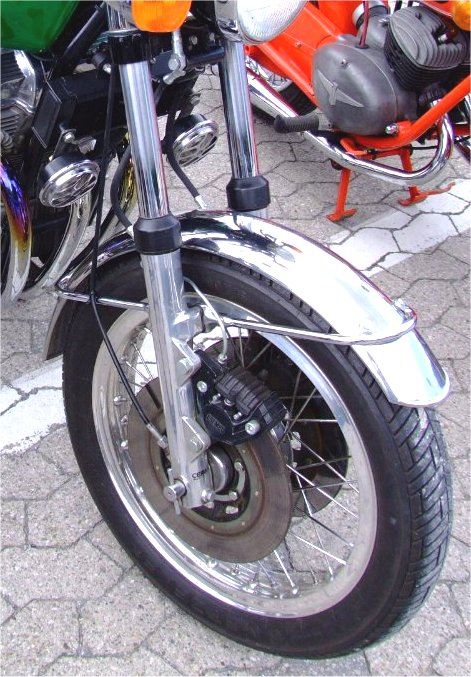
Telescoping hydraulic frame fork by Ceriani mounted on a 1974 Laverda 1000, with Brembo twin disc brakes

Ceriani, formerly Arces, was an Italian company that designed and fabricated motorcycle frames and suspensions. The company was founded by Arturo Ceriani in 1951. Arces is an acronym derived from Arturo Ceriani S.r.l.

In the European motorcycle industry, it was common for many smaller parts companies to exist, each responsible for creating individual parts to later be assembled into a complete motorcycle. Within a few years of its creation, Ceriani's company was able to successfully make a name for itself by manufacturing components noted for their quality and vision.

In 1964, under the leadership of Arturo's son Enrico Ceriani, the companies operations were expanded. Enrico accelerated the expansion by moving the company to a new and more modern plant in Samarate. From 1964 the company was known within the industry as ARCES (an acronym of ARturo CEriani Samarate) but the brand identity was maintained and the company continued to be known as Ceriani by consumers.

A central development in the new plant was the creation of a team that was dedicated to studying and designing new solutions for the suspension systems and frames of competition motorcycles.

In the late 1960s, Ceriani began to produce an innovative new type of fork slider made of a light alloy for use in competition and a revolutionary type of telescopic hydraulic suspension that was originally used on motocross bikes but was later applied to street motorcycles.

The demand for the new suspension was so high that ARCES output had doubled compared to the year before. The new technology exploded onto the market and by 1972 Ceriani had sold 100,000 suspension units, 30,000 to competition motorcycles and 70,000 to consumer street bikes.

In the late 1970s, Ceriani experienced a rapid and unexpected decline during the overall crisis in the European manufacturing sector due to increased demand that stressed the capabilities of smaller companies. Other companies were able to successfully adapt and fill the niche of competition motorcycle parts manufacturing that was left vacant by Ceriani's inability to effectively meet rising demand.

Ceriani was not able to recover to the changing market and their plant closed down in 1980. The prestigious Ceriani brand name was bought in 1997 by Italian motorcycle parts maker Paioli.

== See also ==
- List of Italian companies
