= Aircraft 140 =

Aircraft 140 may refer to:

- serial number 140, of an aircraft model
- aircraft registration tail number 140

Aircraft models

- OKB-1 140, a Soviet forward-swept-wing jet prototype
- Agusta GA.140
- Amiot 140
- Antonov An-140
- ANF Les Mureaux 140T
- Avro Canada TS-140
- Blohm & Voss Ha 140
- Caudron C.140
- Cessna 140
- Farman F.140 Super Goliath
- Lockheed CP-140 Aurora
- Lockheed JetStar C-140
- Morane-Saulnier MS.140
- Nieuport 140
- Potez-CAMS 140
- SAN Jodel D.140 Mousquetaire
- Schröder AS-140 Mücke
- Yakovlev Yak-140

Flights

- China Airlines Flight 140

== See also ==
- 140 (number)
