= Agusta A.104 =

1960 Italian prototype light helicopter

A.104 Helicar
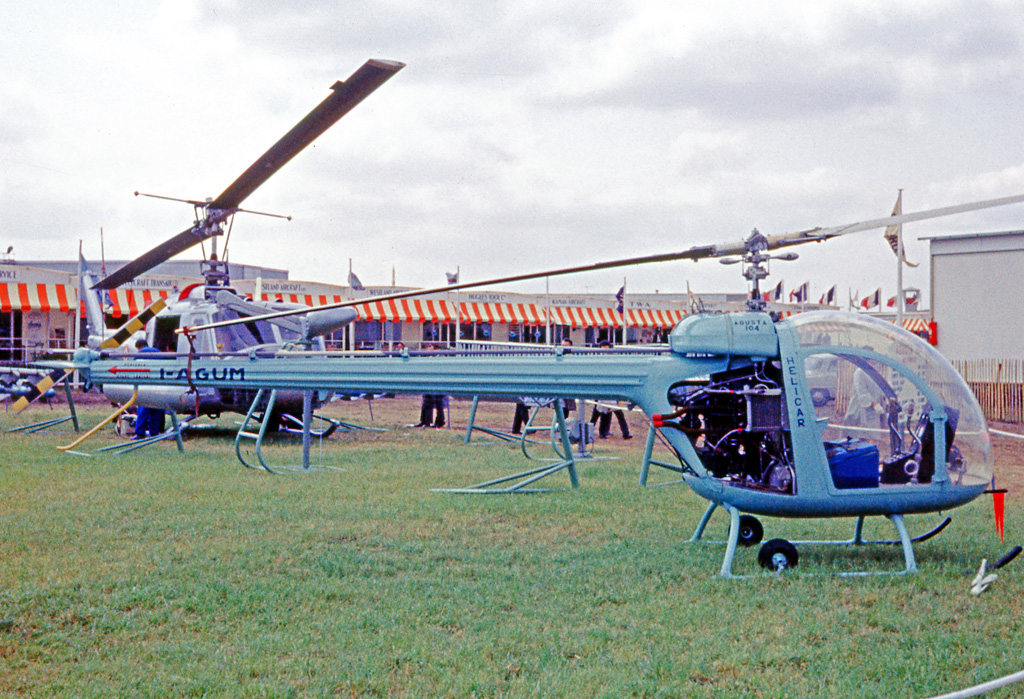
- A.104 prototype exhibited at the 1963 Paris Air Show at Le Bourget Airport

General information
- Type: Light helicopter
- Manufacturer: Agusta
- Status: none active, one preserved
- Primary user: the manufacturer
- Number built: 3

History
- First flight: December 1960

The Agusta A.104 Helicar was an Italian prototype light commercial helicopter first flown in December 1960.

== Production ==
The A.104 was a slightly enlarged version of the A.103, and added a second seat beside the pilot's seat. The cockpit was enclosed by a perspex bubble with the engine at the rear and the tail rotor carried on an enclosed boom.

Two piston-engined prototypes were built, followed by a single example of a turbine-engined variant designated A.104BT. No production resulted.

== Surviving aircraft ==
An example of the A.104 is preserved in the Museo Agusta which is maintained by the Agusta company and is located just south of Milan Malpensa Airport.

== Variants ==
A.104 Helicar
Two prototype aircraft powered by de-rated Agusta GA.140 piston engines.
A.104BT Helicar
A single example of a turbo-shaft powered Helicar, powered by a 270 hp (201 kW) Agusta A.270.

== Specifications ==
Data from Jane's All The World's Aircraft 1961–62

General characteristics

- Crew: 1
- Capacity: 1 passenger
- Length: 6.35 m (20 ft 10 in)
- Height: 2.35 m (7 ft 9 in)
- Empty weight: 380 kg (838 lb)
- Gross weight: 640 kg (1,411 lb)
- Powerplant: 1 × Agusta GA.140 air-cooled flat-four engine, 100 kW (140 hp) (derated to 89 kilowatts (120 hp))
- Main rotor diameter: 7.95 m (26 ft 1 in)
- Main rotor area: 49.6 m^{2} (534 sq ft)

Performance

- Maximum speed: 165 km/h (103 mph, 89 kn) at sea level
- Cruise speed: 135 km/h (84 mph, 73 kn)
- Range: 330 km (210 mi, 180 nmi)
- Endurance: 2 hr 30 min
- Service ceiling: 3,000 m (9,800 ft) (hover ceiling in ground effect)
- Rate of climb: 4.1 m/s (810 ft/min)

== See also ==
Related lists

- List of rotorcraft
