= MV Agusta 125 Regolarità =

Motorcycle model

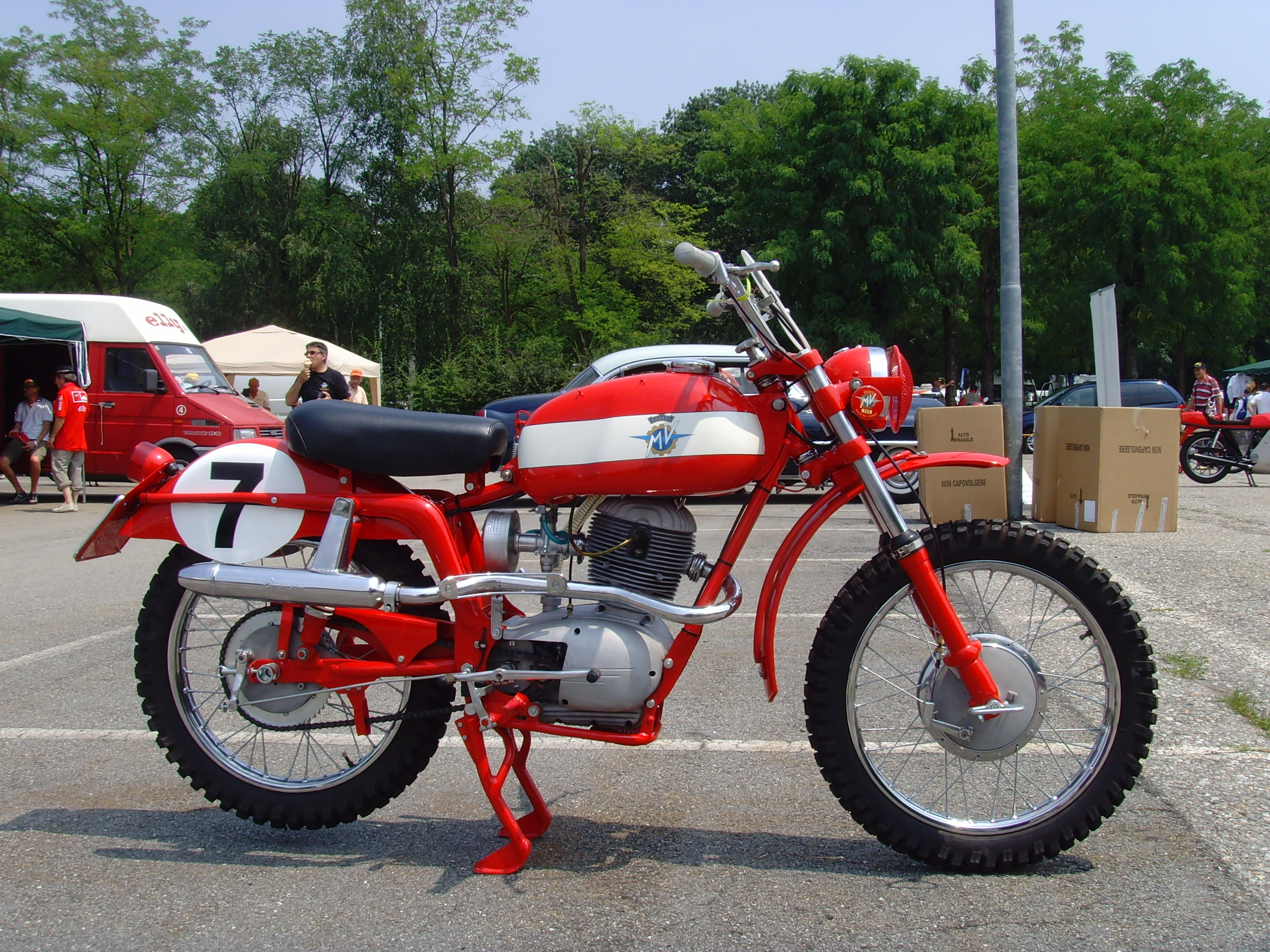
- MV Agusta 125 Regolarità
- Manufacturer: MV Agusta
- Production: 1965-1970
- Class: Dual-sport
- Engine: 123.5 cc (8 cu in) Single-cylinder OHV four-stroke
- Bore / stroke: 53 mm × 56 mm (2.1 in × 2.2 in)
- Compression ratio: 10.5:1
- Power: 1st batch: 10 bhp (7.5 kW) @ 8,000 rpm 2nd batch: 13 bhp (10 kW) @ 8,000 rpm
- Ignition type: Flywheel magneto
- Transmission: Wet, multi-plate clutch, unit construction 5-speed gearbox, chain drive
- Frame type: Double cradle
- Suspension: Front: Telescopic forks Rear: swinging arm with hydraulic dampers
- Brakes: Drum brakes
- Tires: Front: 2.75 x 19; Rear: 3.25 x 19
- Wheelbase: 1,330 mm
- Dimensions: L: 2,060 mm W: 640 mm
- Weight: 216 lb (98 kg) (dry)

The MV Agusta 125 Regolarità was a dual-sport motorcycle built from 1965 to 1970 by the Italian manufacturer MV Agusta at their Cascina Costa plant. Production was 63 machines, built in 2 batches; 46 in 1965 and 17 in 1969.

== Background ==
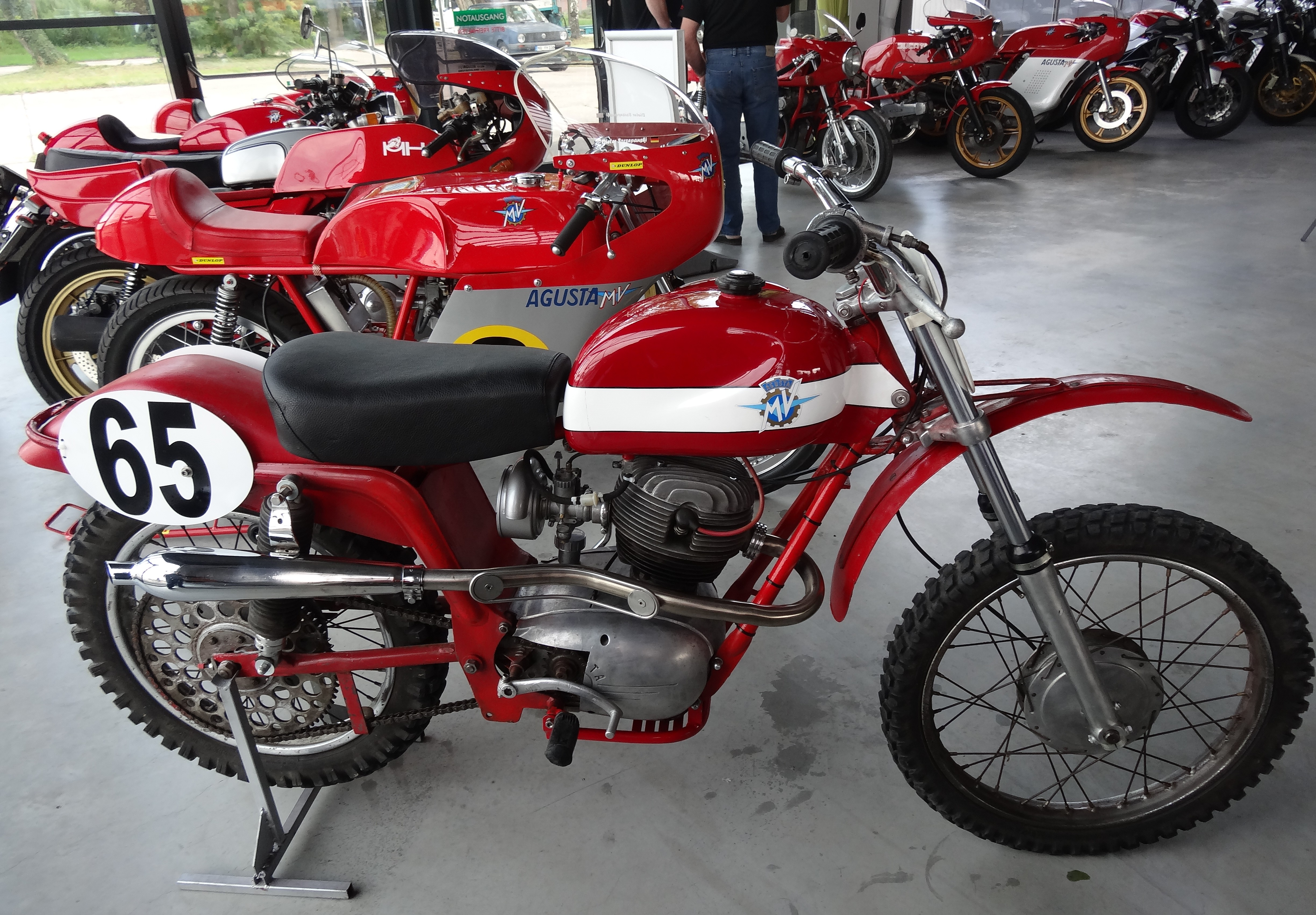
MV Agusta 125 Competition Regolarità

After the 150 Regolarità model of the early fifties, MV Agusta had abandoned the off-road sector, but the popularity of this sector in the sixties caused Count Domenico Agusta to rethink the potential of this new market and ordered the construction of some dedicated machines. In 1963 an off-road competition motorcycle were prepared, the 125 Regolarità, derived from the Centomila model, with a five speed gearbox, reinforced frame and specialised suspension from Ceriani. The four-stroke OHV single-cylinder engine was developed to produce 12.5 bhp (9 kW) @ 8,500 rpm.

The factory machines we entrusted to Dante Mattioli of the Fiamme Oro team to race. Good results were obtained, 2 team victories and 30 individual victories. Following the victories consequent interest from riders, a limited production run was made in 1965 for private riders.

== Production ==
Placed on pre-order at 310,000 lira in the summer of 1965, the motorcycle was officially presented at the November at the Milan EICMA Motorcycle Show. Initially production was 46 units. Using the frame from the competition machines and Ceriani forks, the engine was detuned to produce 10 bhp. Also derived from the factory machines was the quickly detachable rear wheel, which left the hub and brake in place when removed. The model featured a high-level exhaust, rubber mounted petrol tank, headlight guard and swivelling footrests.

A second batch of 17 machines was built in 1969. These machines had a different tank, front brake, forks, and carburettor. Power output was increased to 13 bhp (10 kW) @ 8,000 rpm.
