= Agusta =

Italian helicopter manufacturer (1923-2000)

- Type: Private
- Industry: Aircraft
- Founded: 1923
- Founder: Count Giovanni Agusta
- Defunct: July 2000
- Fate: Merged with Westland Helicopters
- Successor: AgustaWestland
- Headquarters: Samarate, Italy
- Key people: Domenico Agusta

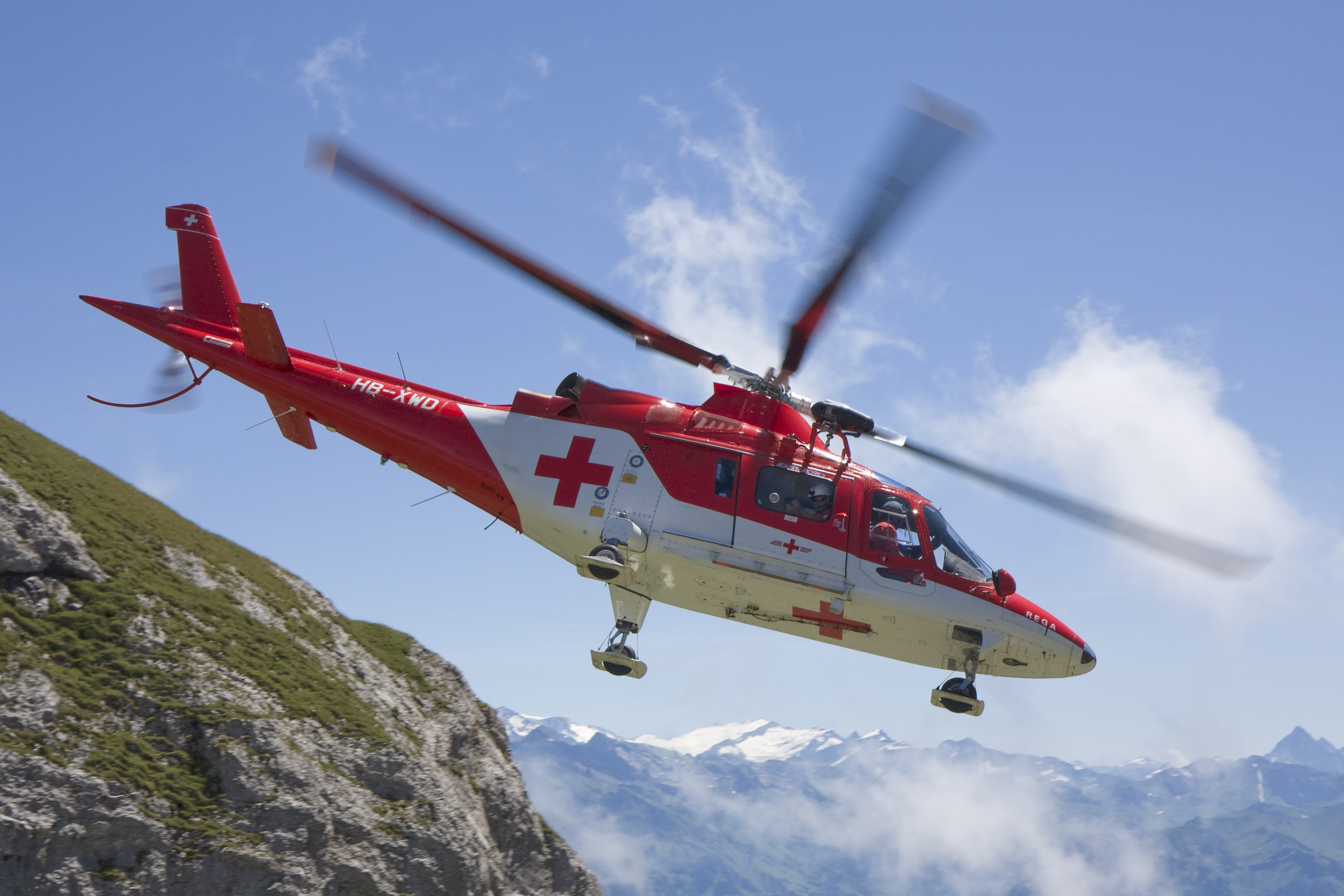
A Swiss SAR helicopter A109K2

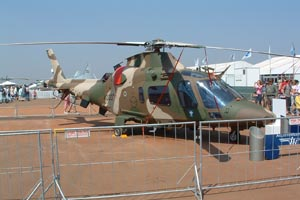
A South African Air Force A109LUH.

Agusta was an Italian helicopter manufacturer. It was based in Samarate, Northern Italy. The company was founded by Count Giovanni Agusta in 1923, who flew his first aeroplane in 1907. The MV Agusta motorcycle manufacturer began as an offshoot of the Agusta aviation company at the end of the Second World War, as a means to save the jobs of employees of the Agusta firm.

In July 2000, Agusta merged with Westland Helicopters to form AgustaWestland S.p.A., a multinational helicopter design and manufacturing company. In 2016 it became a wholly owned subsidiary of Leonardo S.p.A.

== History ==
From 1952, the company became involved in helicopter manufacturing, first building Bell helicopters under licence, but later Sikorsky, Boeing and McDonnell Douglas products as well. The company also had ambitions to design and build its own helicopters. The Agusta A.101 and the Agusta A.106 can be considered the best of its earlier attempts. Others included the AB.102, A.103, A.104, and A.115. It also produced a small line of aero engines such as the GA.70 and GA.140.

Developed in the 1970s, the Agusta A109 is a commercial and military twin-turbine helicopter, of which the latest variants are still in production.

In 1983, the Agusta A129 Mangusta anti-tank helicopter partook in its first official flight engagement. It was the first attack helicopter to be designed and produced in Western Europe. However, this helicopter has been a limited commercial success so far, seeing service with the Italian Army, and has also been a modernized variant being developed for the Turkish Army.

The 1980s saw the start of several collaborative projects for Agusta. In 1981 Agusta and Westland of Britain started the EH101 medium-lift naval helicopter project in order to satisfy the requirements of the Royal Navy and the Italian Navy. In 1985 the company started a collaborative programme with the aeronautic industries of France, Germany and the Netherlands in order to develop and produce the NHIndustries NH90, a nine-ton twin-engine multi-role medium helicopter in order to satisfy the requirements of their respective countries’ armed forces.

1990s projects include the Agusta A109 Power, an improved version of the A109C series (1994) and the Agusta A119 Koala (1997), a single-engine design based on the A109.

Agusta became involved in the Belgian bribery scandal when it was revealed that the company had paid the two Belgian socialist parties who were then (1988/1989) in the government to assist the company in getting the contract for attack helicopters for the Belgian Army.

In 1998, Agusta formed a joint venture with Bell Helicopter Textron called the Bell/Agusta Aerospace Company. Its aim was to develop the Bell/Agusta AB139 helicopter and the Bell/Agusta BA609 tiltrotor aircraft. Bell later withdrew from the BA609 project, which is now known as the AgustaWestland AW609.

In July 2000, Finmeccanica and GKN plc agreed to merge their respective helicopter subsidiaries (Agusta and GKN-Westland Helicopters), forming AgustaWestland.

It was reported on 12 February 2013 that the chief executive, Giuseppe Orsi, was arrested on corruption charges. Prosecutors allege he paid bribes to ensure the sale of 12 helicopters to the Indian government, when he was head of the group's AgustaWestland unit. In 2019, he was fully acquitted of all charges by the Italian judiciary.

On 13 February 2013, Finmeccanica's Board of Directors named Alessandro Pansa as chief executive officer and resolved to confer the role of vice chairman to Admiral Guido Venturoni.

Shortly after Pansa's appointment, Italian investigators discovered a case of bribery by Finmeccanica in its deal with India following which the government of India issued a show cause notice to the company.

A complaint was filed seeking an investigation into the sale of 21 civil helicopters worth over Rs 7,000 crore (US$1.6 billion) by AgustaWestland between 2005 and 2013 in India. As per the complaint Agusta Westland has been selling civil helicopters in India through. Tax authorities in India have been asked to probe the possibility of tax evasion by Sharp Ocean on the commission received for the sale of helicopters and foreign exchange deprivation to the country by off-shoring payments for the sale of helicopters in India.

Separately, the comptroller and auditor general, in its latest report, has indicted the Chhattisgarh government for overpaying Rs.65 lakh (US$120,000) for the purchase of a VVIP helicopter -an Agusta A-109 Power helicopter. Both companies are promoted by twin brothers Nayan Jagjivan and Nakul Jagjivan.

== Products ==
=== Aircraft ===
- A.101 prototype transport helicopter
- A.103 prototype single-seat light helicopter
- A.104 Helicar prototype light helicopter
- A.105 prototype light helicopter
- A.106 light ASW helicopter
- A109/AW109 multi-purpose helicopter
- A.115 prototype light helicopter
- AW119 Koala utility helicopter
- A129 Mangusta attack helicopter
- AZ8-L prototype propliner/airliner
- EMA 124 prototype light utility helicopter
- CP-110 prototype light propeller aircraft

Joint ventures

- AgustaBell AB139
- Bell/Agusta BA609 (50% share)
- EHI Industries EH101
- NH90 (32% share)

Licensed production

- AB 47
- AB102
- AB204
- AB205
- AB206 Jet Ranger
- AB212
- AB412
- AS-61
  - AS-61R

=== Aircraft engines ===
- Agusta GA.40
- Agusta GA.70

== See also ==
- List of Italian companies
- 2013 Indian helicopter bribery scandal
