= Agusta GA.70 =

GA.70
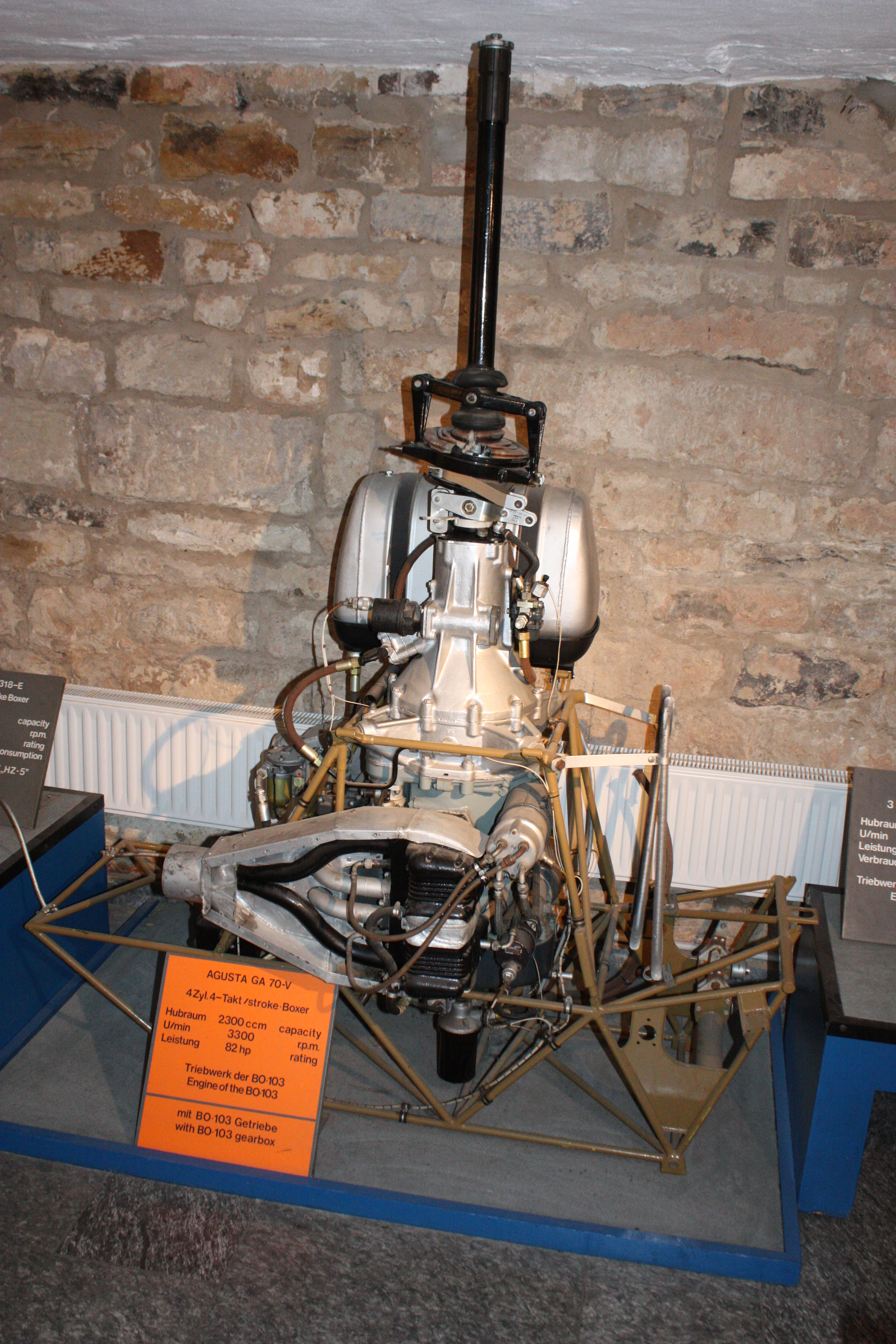
- GA.70 on display at the Hubschraubermuseum Bückeburg
- Type: 4-cylinder, air-cooled, horizontally opposed engine
- National origin: Italy
- Manufacturer: Agusta
- First run: 1955

The Agusta GA.70 was a four-cylinder, air-cooled, horizontally opposed engine developed in Italy for light aircraft and helicopter use. The GA.70/V featured a bottom sump for vertical applications and was rated at 61 kW (82 hp). It was produced in the 1950s and 1960s.

== Variants ==
GA.70/0
Horizontal mounting for light aircraft.
GA.70/V
Vertical mounting for helicopters.

== Applications ==
- Agusta A.103
- Bölkow Bo 103
- de Bernardi M.d.B. 02 Aeroscooter
- Phoenix Minor
- Phoenix Major

== Specifications (GA.70) ==
Data from Jane's All the World's Aircraft 1962-63.

=== General characteristics ===
- Type: 4-cylinder air-cooled horizontally opposed aircraft piston engine, (G.A.70/V - vertically mounted helicopter engine)
- Bore: 92 mm (3.6 in)
- Stroke: 86.5 mm (3.4 in)
- Displacement: 2.3 L (140.4 cu in)
- Length: 760 mm (29.9 in), (G.A.70/V - 470 mm (18.5 in))
- Width: 750 mm (29.5 in), (G.A.70/V - 540 mm (21.3 in))
- Height: 450 mm (17.7 in), (G.A.70/V - 470 mm (18.5 in))
- Dry weight: 80 kg (176 lb) dry
- Designer: M. Ginnini

=== Components ===
- Valvetrain: pushrod operated overhead valve, 2 x inlet + 2 x exhaust valves per cylinder
- Fuel system: Stromberg NAS 3 carburettor
- Fuel type: 80/87 octane
- Oil system: Pressure lubrication with a gear driven pump
- Cooling system: Air-cooled

=== Performance ===
- Power output: 54 kW (72 hp) at 3,100rpm, (G.A.70/V - 61 kW (82 hp) at 3,300rpm)
- Specific power: 23.35 kW/L (0.51 hp/cu in), (G.A.70/V - 26.6 kW/L (0.58 hp/cu in))
- Power-to-weight ratio: 0.67 kW/kg (0.41 hp/lb), (G.A.70/V - 0.765 kW/kg (0.465 hp/lb))
