= Giovanni Agusta =

Italian entrepreneur and aircraft pioneer

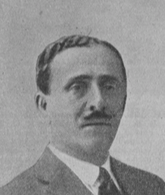
- Born: 1879
- Died: 1927 (aged 47–48)
- Known for: Formed the Agusta company

Count Giovanni Agusta (Parma, 1879 – Parma, 1927) was an italian entrepreneur and aircraft pioneer. He formed the Agusta company in 1923 which became part of AgustaWestland in 2000. He died in 1927. His son, Count Domenico Agusta, followed in the family business, Agusta. The MV Agusta motorcycle manufacturer began as an offshoot of the Agusta aviation company at the end of the Second World War as a means to save the jobs of employees of the Agusta firm.

In 1907, Agusta designed and built a biplane called the Ag1, and in 1912 he volunteered for the Italian-Turkish War in Libya; in 1913 he was hired by Caproni as an inspector in charge of delivering bombers to the front.
