= Partenavia Aeroscooter =

P.53 Aeroscooter
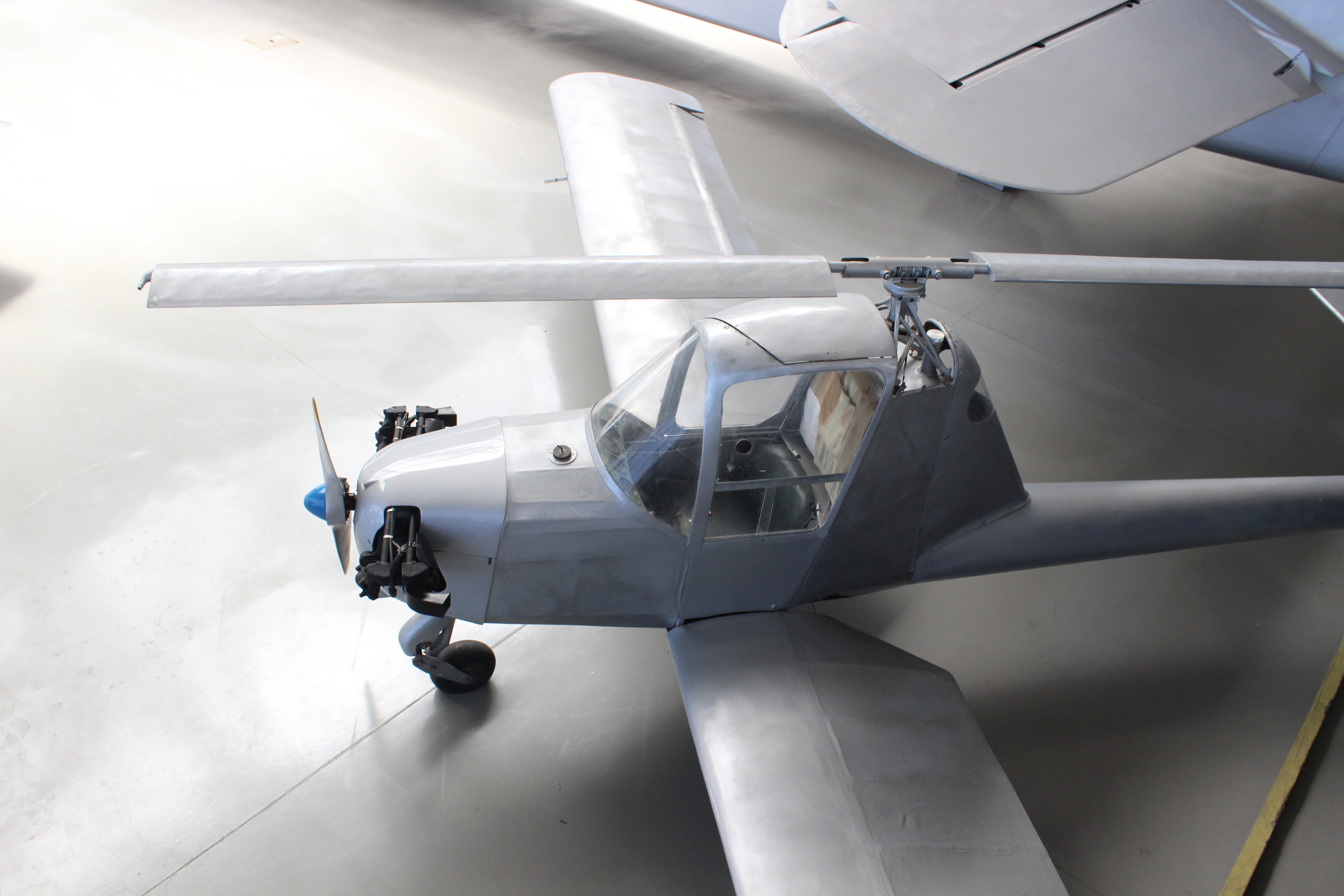

General information
- Type: Experimental hybrid monoplane
- National origin: Italy
- Manufacturer: Partenavia
- Designer: Mario de Bernardi
- Status: On display
- Number built: 1

History
- First flight: 2 April 1951
- Variant: de Bernardi M.d.B. 02 Aeroscooter

The Partenavia P.53 Aeroscooter was a 1950s Italian single-seat light aircraft fitted with a two-bladed rotor. It was designed by Luigi Pascale with Mario de Bernardi and built by Partenavia.

== Design and development ==
The Aeroscooter was low-wing monoplane powered by a 22 hp (16 kW) Ambrosini P-25 piston engine in the nose. It had a fixed nose-wheel landing gear. Above the enclosed single-seat cockpit a pylon was to have been fitted with an autorotating, unpowered two-bladed rotor which was to reduce the stalling speed and the rate-of-descent if the engine failed.

Only one Aeroscooter was built and it first flew on 2 April 1951 without the rotor fitted. The Aeroscooter survives and is on display at the Museo Storico Dell Aeronautico Militare Italiana. A two-seat derivative was produced by Mario de Baernardi as the de Bernardi M.d.B. 02 Aeroscooter.

== Variants ==
- De Bernardi M.d.B. 02 Aeroscooter – The two seat follow on aircraft designed by De Bernardi.

== Specifications (Ambrosini engine, no rotor) ==
Data from Jane's All the World's Aircraft 1957–58

General characteristics

- Capacity: 1
- Length: 5.12 m (16 ft 10 in)
- Wingspan: 8.28 m (27 ft 2 in)
- Height: 1.70 m (5 ft 7 in)
- Wing area: 8.3 m^{2} (89 sq ft)
- Airfoil: NACA 63-series
- Empty weight: 180 kg (397 lb)
- Gross weight: 280 kg (617 lb)
- Powerplant: 1 × Ambrosini P-25 , 16 kW (22 hp)
- Propellers: 2-bladed

Performance

- Maximum speed: 150 km/h (93 mph, 81 kn) at sea level
- Cruise speed: 120 km/h (75 mph, 65 kn)
- Stall speed: 60 km/h (37 mph, 32 kn)
- Range: 500 km (310 mi, 270 nmi)
- Service ceiling: 3,500 m (11,500 ft)
- Wing loading: 33.7 kg/m^{2} (6.9 lb/sq ft)
