= Agusta A.106 =

Anti-submarine helicopter by Agusta

A.106
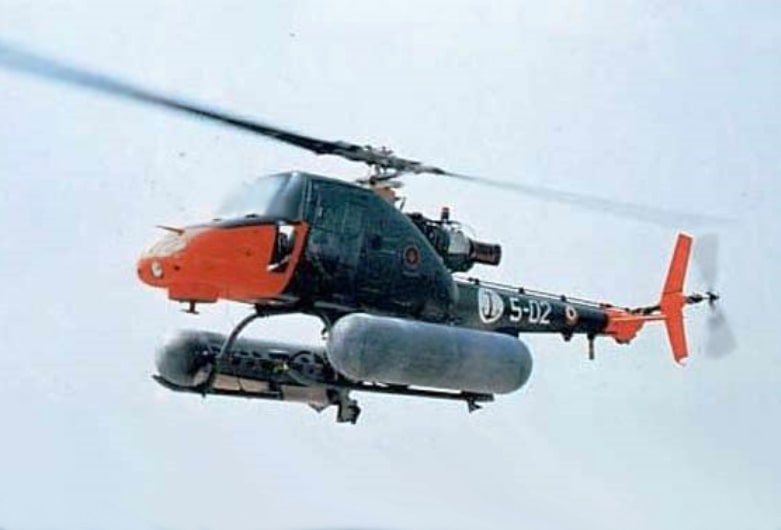
- Agusta A.106 maiden flight

General information
- Type: Light anti-submarine warfare helicopter
- Manufacturer: Agusta
- Status: Retired
- Primary user: Italian Navy
- Number built: 2

History
- First flight: November 1965
- Retired: 1973

The Agusta A.106 was a single-seat light helicopter designed to provide an anti-submarine warfare (ASW) platform for the Impavido-class destroyers of the Italian Navy. The aircraft was provided with a sophisticated electronics suite by Ferranti for autostabilisation and contact identification. Two torpedoes could be slung under the fuselage. The tail and two-bladed main rotor could be folded for shipboard stowage, and the skid undercarriage had fittings for flotation bags.

Two prototypes were built, the first flying in November 1965. A pre-production batch of five was cancelled by the Navy in 1973.

== Operators ==
Italy

- Italian Navy (Marina Militare) for evaluation only

== Specifications ==
Data from Jane's All The World's Aircraft 1969-70

General characteristics

- Crew: one, pilot
- Length: 8.00 m (26 ft 3 in)
- Height: 2.5 m (8 ft 2.5 in)
- Empty weight: 590 kg (1,300 lb)
- Gross weight: 1,400 kg (3,086 lb)
- Powerplant: 1 × Turbomeca-Agusta TA.230 , 224 kW (300 hp)
- Main rotor diameter: 9.50 m (31 ft 2 in)
- Main rotor area: 70.9 m^{2} (763 sq ft)

Performance

- Maximum speed: 176 km/h (109 mph, 95 kn)
- Range: 740 km (460 mi, 400 nmi)
- Endurance: 4 hours 30 minutes
- Service ceiling: 3,000 m (9,800 ft)
- Rate of climb: 6.2 m/s (1,220 ft/min)

Armament

- 2 × Mk.44 torpedoes or
- 10 × depth charges or
- 2 × 7.62 mm machine-guns and 10 × 80 mm rockets

== See also ==
Aircraft of comparable role, configuration, and era

- Westland Wasp
