= Agusta GA.40 =

- Type: 2-cylinder, air-cooled, horizontally opposed aircraft engine
- National origin: Italy
- Manufacturer: Agusta
- Designer: M. Ginnini
- First run: 1955

The Agusta GA.40 was a 2-cylinder, air-cooled, horizontally opposed engine developed in Italy by Agusta for light aircraft use. It was intended for use in motorgliders. The engine was produced in the 1950s and 1960s.

== Specifications ==
Data from Jane's All the World's Aircraft 1962-63

=== General characteristics ===
- Type: 2-cylinder air-cooled horizontally opposed aircraft piston engine
- Bore: 100 mm (3.94 in)
- Stroke: 95 mm (3.74 in)
- Displacement: 1.492 L (91.05 in^{3})
- Length: 613 mm (24.13 in)
- Width: 785 mm (30.91 in)
- Height: 450 mm (17.72 in)
- Dry weight: 56 kg (123 lb) dry
- Designer: M. Ginnini

=== Components ===
- Valvetrain: pushrod operated overhead valve, 1x inlet + 1x exhaust per cylinder
- Fuel system: Stromberg NAS 3A1 carburettor
- Fuel type: 80/87 octane
- Oil system: Pressure lubrication with a gear driven pump
- Cooling system: Air-cooled

=== Performance ===
- Power output: 31.32 kW (42 hp) at 2,700rpm
- Specific power: 20.99 kW/L (0.46 hp/in^{3})
- Power-to-weight ratio: 0.559 kW/kg (0.34 hp/lb)

== Applications ==
- Corby Starlet
- Kokkola Ko-04
