= De Bernardi M.d.B. 02 Aeroscooter =

M.d.B. 02 Aeroscooter

General information
- Type: Light aircraft
- National origin: Italy
- Designer: Mario de Bernardi
- Number built: 1

History
- First flight: 16 November 1957

The de Bernardi M.d.B. 02 Aeroscooter is a two-seat light sport aircraft designed by Mario De Bernardi as a follow-on to the single-seat Partenavia P.53 Aeroscooter.

== Development ==
Having developed the all-metal single-seat Partenavia Aeroscooter earlier, Mario de Bernardi sought to improve the design as the two-seat M.d.B. 02 Aeroscooter, which was developed as an aircraft to be built by CAP in Bergamo, Italy.

== Design ==
The Aeroscooter is a low-wing, two-seat monoplane. The partial welded steel tube fuselage uses aluminum skins. The wing uses a wood spar. The tricycle landing gear uses trailing link suspension. The single-piece plexiglas canopy slides forward to open. All fuel is housed in the 20 L (5.28 US gal; 4.40 imp gal) header tank and 50 L (13.21 US gal; 11.00 imp gal) main tank behind the passenger's seat.

== Operational history ==
The prototype was built by De Bernardi with the assistance of two mechanics. In April 1959, De Bernardi died of a heart attack after flying a demonstration of the prototype at Rome Urbe Airport.

An example is on display at Museo Aeronautico Caproni di Taliedo, Milano.

== Variants ==
The daughter of De Bernardi is offering plans for a modernized version of the Aeroscooter using a Rotax 912UL engine to be flown under Italian microlight category.

== Specifications (M.d.B. 02 Aeroscooter) ==
Data from Jane's All the World's Aircraft 1958-59, The Aircraft of the World

General characteristics

- Crew: 2
- Length: 5.5 m (18 ft 1 in)
- Wingspan: 9.5 m (31 ft 2 in)
- Height: 1.70 m (5 ft 7 in)
- Wing area: 8.300 m^{2} (89.34 sq ft)
- Empty weight: 260 kg (573 lb)
- Gross weight: 460 kg (1,014 lb)
- Fuel capacity: 60 L (15.85 US gal; 13.20 imp gal)
- Powerplant: 1 × Agusta GA.70/0 4-cylinder horizontally-opposed piston engine, 62 kW (83 hp)
- Propellers: 2-bladed fixed-pitch propeller

Performance

- Maximum speed: 210 km/h (130 mph, 110 kn)
- Cruise speed: 190 km/h (120 mph, 100 kn)
- Stall speed: 50 km/h (31 mph, 27 kn)
- Range: 600 km (370 mi, 320 nmi)
- Rate of climb: 6 m/s (1,200 ft/min) at sea level
- Take-off run: 50 m (164 ft)
- Landing run: 50 m (164 ft)

== See also ==
Aircraft of comparable role, configuration, and era

- Erco Ercoupe
