= Bell Agusta Aerospace Company =

Joint venture by Bell Helicopter and Agusta

- Company type: Aerospace
- Founded: 1998
- Defunct: 2011
- Successor: AgustaWestland Tilt-Rotor Company
- Headquarters: Fort Worth, Texas, United States
- Products: Tiltrotors
- Parent: Bell Helicopter and AgustaWestland

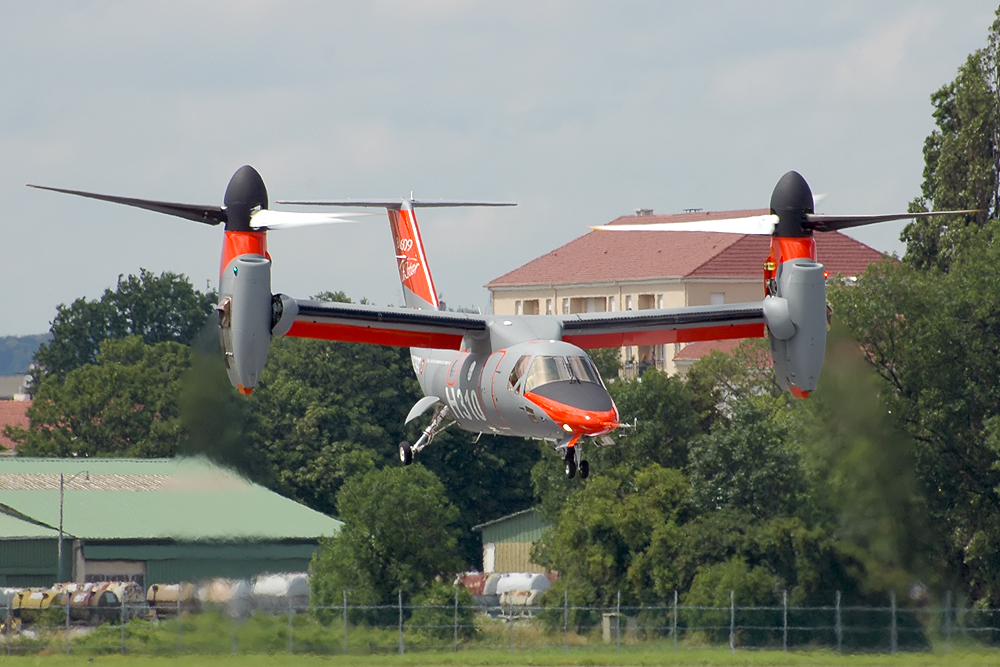
Bell-Augusta BA-609 in helicopter mode (2007 Paris airshow)

Bell Agusta Aerospace Company (BAAC) was a joint venture formed in 1998 by Bell Helicopter and Agusta (now AgustaWestland), who collaborated on a variety of products dating back to 1952. The joint venture was dissolved in 2011, when AgustaWestland took full ownership of the project, renaming it as the AgustaWestland Tilt-Rotor Company (AWTRC).

== History ==
Bell Helicopter has had a close association with AgustaWestland. The partnership dates back to separate manufacturing and technology agreements with Agusta (Bell 47 and Bell 206) and as a sublicense via Agusta with Westland (Bell 47). When the two European firms merged, the partnerships were retained, with the exception of the AB139, which is now known as the AW139.

In June 2011, AgustaWestland took full ownership of the BA609 tiltrotor program. Bell Agusta Aerospace Company (BAAC) was renamed as the AgustaWestland Tilt-Rotor Company (AWTRC), and will remain a US company being the new type certificate applicant to FAA. The new company is wholly owned by AgustaWestland and the BA609 tiltrotor has been rebranded as the AW609.

== Products ==
- AgustaWestland AW609 - a civil twin-engined tiltrotor vertical take-off and landing aircraft with a configuration similar to the Bell-Boeing V-22 Osprey (formerly the Bell/Agusta BA609, now 100% AgustaWestland).
- AgustaWestland AW139 helicopter (formerly 50/50 as the Agusta/Bell AB139, now 100% AgustaWestland)
