= Agusta A.103 =

1959 Italian prototype light helicopter

A.103
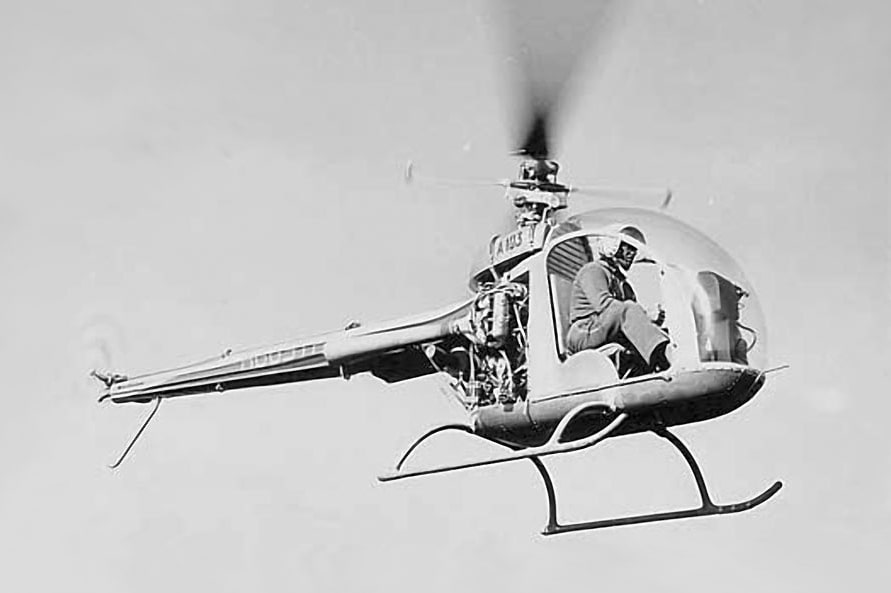

General information
- Type: Light helicopter
- Manufacturer: Agusta

History
- First flight: October 1959

The Agusta A.103 was an Italian prototype single-seat light helicopter flown in October 1959. The pilot was enclosed by a perspex bubble with the engine at the rear and the tail rotor carried on an enclosed boom.

== Specifications ==
Data from Jane's All The World's Aircraft 1961–62

General characteristics

- Crew: 1
- Length: 6.13 m (20 ft 1 in)
- Height: 2.23 m (7 ft 4 in)
- Empty weight: 280 kg (617 lb)
- Gross weight: 460 kg (1,014 lb)
- Powerplant: 1 × Agusta GA.70 air-cooled flat-four engine, 63 kW (85 hp)
- Main rotor diameter: 7.40 m (24 ft 3 in)

Performance

- Maximum speed: 150 km/h (93 mph, 81 kn)
- Cruise speed: 135 km/h (84 mph, 73 kn)
- Range: 450 km (280 mi, 240 nmi)
- Endurance: 3 hr 20 min
- Service ceiling: 2,000 m (6,600 ft) (hover ceiling in ground effect)
- Rate of climb: 4.0 m/s (787 ft/min)

== See also ==
Related lists

- List of rotorcraft
