= Agusta GA.140 =

Piston engine

GA.140
- Type: 4-cyl. horizontally opposed air-cooled piston engine
- National origin: Italy
- Manufacturer: Agusta

The Agusta GA.140/V is a 4-cylinder, air-cooled, horizontally opposed engine mounted vertically, developed in Italy for helicopter use and produced from 1962 to 1969.

== Specifications (G.A.140/V) ==
Data from Jane's All the World's Aircraft 1962–63

=== General characteristics ===
- Type: 4-cylinder air-cooled horizontally opposed helicopter piston engine
- Bore: 114.3 mm (4.50 in)
- Stroke: 88.9 mm (3.50 in)
- Displacement: 3.653 L (222.92 cu in)
- Length: 580 mm (22.83 in)
- Width: 800 mm (31.50 in)
- Height: 690 mm (27.17 in)
- Dry weight: 116 kg (256 lb) dry
- Designer: M. Ginnini

=== Components ===
- Valvetrain: pushrod operated overhead valve, 2x inlet + 2x exhaust per cylinder
- Fuel system: Marvel-Schebler MA 4.5 carburettor
- Fuel type: 91 octane minimum
- Oil system: Pressure lubrication with a gear driven pump
- Cooling system: Air-cooled

=== Performance ===
- Power output: 102.91 kW (138 hp) at 3,200 rpm
- Specific power: 28.173 kW/L (0.619 hp/cu in)
- Compression ratio: 8.2:1
- Power-to-weight ratio: 0.887 kW/kg (0.5395 hp/lb)

== Applications ==
- Agusta A.104
