= Domenico Agusta =

Italian entrepreneur

Count Domenico Agusta
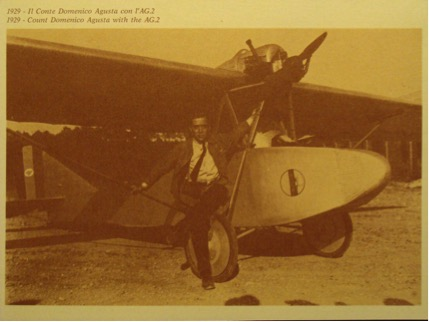
- Domenico Agusta standing by an Agusta AG.2 monoplane
- Born: 28 February 1907; Palermo, Kingdom of Italy
- Died: 2 February 1971 (aged 63); Milan, Italy
- Occupation: Entrepreneur

Count Domenico Agusta (28 February 1907 – 2 February 1971) was an Italian entrepreneur. He took over the running of the Agusta aeronautical company following the death of his father in 1927, and founded the MV Agusta motorcycle company in 1945.

== Biography ==
Son of Giovanni Agusta, an aeronautical entrepreneur and founder of the Agusta company, at the age of 6 he accompanied his father Giovanni to Northern Italy who moved to start his pioneering aviation career. The family settled near Cascina Costa, Lombardy. He soon became fond of motorcycles, in addition to aeroplanes. At 19, he was among the first to serve at Malpensa in the Regia Aeronautica, the new autonomous aviation armed force.

In 1927 his father died from the after-effects of an operation and Domenico assumed the responsibility of the company together with his mother and younger brother Vincenzo. From 1932 to 1945 he devoted himself totally to the aeronautical industry, with the construction of various models for military aviation.

In 1945, following the provisions of the peace treaty after WW2, which were later reiterated in the Paris Peace Treaties, 1947, the production of aircraft was forbidden to Italy and the company had to face a period of crisis that it tried to overcome, changing the production lines and adapting to build boats and buses. In that year Meccanica Verghera was founded, in order to mass-produce a light-weight motorcycle equipped with a 98 cc two-stroke engine, which had been designed in 1943, but development and production had been interrupted by the war. The MV Agusta models grew in popularity, and under the direct guidance of Domenico, the company developed competition motorcycles that won races and championships. Domenico would often work alongside his mechanics and engineers on the racing motorcycles.

The prohibition on Italian aircraft building was lifted in 1950. Realising the future of helicopters, Domenico entered into an agreement in 1952 to build Bell helicopters under licence. Similar arrangements were made in the 1960s with Sikorsky, Boeing and McDonnell Douglas.

In 1958 he became a Knight of the Order of Merit for Labour.

Domenico purchased the O.S.C.A. (Officine Specializzate Costruzione Automobili—Fratelli Maserati S.p.A.) company, manufacturers of racing and sports cars, from the Maserati brothers in 1963.

In the 1960s he was involved in a famous scandal: having denied his daughter Giovanna permission to marry the footballer José Germano de Sales despite being pregnant, the young couple moved to Liège where they married on 17 June 1967. Three years later the two divorced and Germano returned to Brazil, where he bought a farm with money from his former father-in-law.

On 29 January 1971, while he was accompanying the President of Finland, Urho Kekkonen, on a visit the Agusta plant, he suffered a heart attack: he died four days later, in his Milan apartment in Piazza Sant'Erasmo. The funeral took place on 4 February at Gallarate.

He was the brother of Mario Agusta, president of the Federazione Italiana Motonautica (Italian Powerboating Federation).

== Bibliography ==
- Falloon, Ian (2011). The Book of the Classic MV Agusta Fours. Veloce Publishing Ltd. ISBN 9781845842031.
- Frank, Aaron P. (2003). Honda Motorcycles. MotorBooks International. ISBN 9781610609586.
- McGowen, Stanley S. (2005). Helicopters: An Illustrated History of Their Impact. ABC-CLIO. ISBN 9781851094684.
- Walker, Mick (1998). Mick Walker's Italian Racing Motorcycles. Redline Books. ISBN 9780953131112.
- Dizionario biografico enciclopedico di un secolo del calcio italiano (in Italian). Baldini & Castoldi. 2000. ISBN 9788880898627.
