= Yakovlev Yak-140 =

Soviet prototype lightweight supersonic fighter

Yak-140
- Side view of a Yak-140 showing the tandem undercarriage and outriggers

General information
- Type: Fighter
- National origin: Soviet Union
- Manufacturer: Yakovlev
- Status: Cancelled
- Number built: 1

The Yakovlev Yak-140 was a Soviet prototype lightweight supersonic fighter developed during the 1950s. The prototype was completed in 1954, but it was denied authorization to enter flight testing and the program was cancelled in 1956.

== Development ==
The Yak-140 was developed around the Mikulin AM-11 turbojet (rated at 40 kN (9,000 lb_{f}) thrust dry and 50 kN (11,000 lb_{f}) with afterburner) to meet a specification issued in 1953 requiring a supersonic fighter with a maximum speed of 1,650–1,750 km/h (1,030–1,090 mph) and a range of 1,800 km (1,100 mi). It was to be armed with three 30 mm (1.2 in) cannon with 75 rounds per gun and was to be capable of carrying air-to-ground rockets as well as 200 kg (440 lb) of bombs. Its fully loaded weight was to be 4,850 kg (10,690 lb) and it was to be ready to be submitted for State acceptance trials in March 1955.

The fighter had a semi-monocoque circular-section fuselage with a nose air intake. A range-only radar was fitted in the conical inlet cone of the air intake. The wings had a sweep angle of 55° at quarterchord. Two wing fences were fitted on the upper surface of each wing. The horizontal stabilizer was midway down the rear fuselage and two air brakes were fitted on its underside. The cockpit canopy was faired into the spine that ran the length of the top of the fuselage. The tandem landing gear had a single wheel on the forward unit and twin wheels on the main unit with outrigger struts that retracted aft into wingtip fairings.

The aircraft's State acceptance trials were delayed until the first quarter of 1956 for lack of a flight-ready AM-11 engine, but it had to be adapted to use a less powerful Mikulin AM-9D engine with only 26 kN (5,800 lb_{f}) of dry thrust. The gun armament was reduced to only two 23 mm (0.91 in) Nudelman-Rikhter NR-23 guns with 75 rounds per gun in compensation, but the estimated speed dropped by about 400 km/h (250 mph) regardless. This was deemed to be acceptable as it sufficed to begin flight testing.

The prototype was completed in December 1954 and it passed all the necessary ground tests by 10 February 1955 when it was cleared to begin flight trials. However, the Ministerstvo Aviatsionnoy Promyshlennosti (Ministry of Aviation Industry (MAP)) denied Yakovlev authorization to begin flight tests as it favored competing designs from Sukhoi and Mikoyan-Gurevich. A Council of Ministers directive was issued on 28 March 1956 to terminate the program and the corresponding MAP order followed on 6 April.

== Specifications (with AM-9D (estimated)) ==
Data from Gordon, et al., OKB Yakovlev: A History of the Design Bureau and its Aircraft

General characteristics

- Crew: 1
- Length: 13.34 m (43 ft 9 in)
- Wingspan: 7.395 m (24 ft 3 in)
- Wing area: 19 m^{2} (200 sq ft)
- Empty weight: 3,315 kg (7,308 lb)
- Max takeoff weight: 4,850 kg (10,692 lb)
- Powerplant: 1 × Mikulin AM-9D axial flow afterburning turbojet, 26 kN (5,800 lbf) thrust dry, 32.5 kN (7,300 lbf) with afterburner

Performance

- Maximum speed: 1,275 km/h (792 mph, 688 kn) at sea level
- Range: 1,900 km (1,200 mi, 1,000 nmi)
- Service ceiling: 18,000 m (59,000 ft)
- Time to altitude: 2.1 minutes to 10,000 metres (32,808 ft)

Armament

- Guns: 2 x 23 mm (0.91 in) Nudelman-Rikhter NR-23 guns

== Bibliography ==
- Gordon, Yefim; Komissariov, Dmitry and Sergey (2005). OKB Yakovlev: A History of the Design Bureau and its Aircraft. Hinckley, England: Midland Publishing. ISBN 1-85780-203-9.
- Gunston, Bill (1995). The Osprey Encyclopedia of Russian Aircraft 1875-1995. London: Osprey. ISBN 1-85532-405-9.
