= Schröder AS-140 Mücke =

German autogyro

AS-140 Mücke

General information
- Type: Autogyro
- National origin: Germany
- Manufacturer: Schröder Expeditions Gyrocopter
- Status: In production (2013)

The Schröder AS-140 Mücke (English: Mosquito) is a German autogyro, designed and produced by Schröder Expeditions Gyrocopter of Akelsbarg as a portable, man-packable aircraft, supplied as a kit for amateur construction or as a complete ready-to-fly-aircraft.

== Design and development ==
The AS-140 Mücke was designed to be broken down into loads and man-packed on expeditions or shipped to destination and then assembled for use. When broken down the aircraft can be packed as 125 cm (49.2 in) length X 80 cm (31.5 in) width X 70 cm (27.6 in) height package that weighs 55 kg (121 lb). It features a single main rotor, a single-seat open cockpit without a windshield, a T-tail, tricycle landing gear without wheel pants and a 25 hp (19 kW) Limbach Flugmotoren or 24 hp (18 kW) Rockwell International engine in pusher configuration.

The aircraft fuselage is made from bolted-together aluminum tubing, augmented by stainless steel sheet components. Its 6 m (19.7 ft) diameter two-bladed rotor has a chord of 18 cm (7.1 in). The permissible installed engine power range is 24 to 40 hp (18 to 30 kW), but due to centre of gravity considerations the engine fitted must weigh no more than 13 kg (29 lb). With its empty weight of 55 kg (121 lb) and a gross weight of 190 kg (419 lb) the AS-140 has a useful load of 135 kg (298 lb).

The aircraft is supplied assembled, but the manufacturer can supply kits upon request.

== Specifications (AS-140 Mücke) ==
Data from Bayerl

General characteristics

- Crew: one
- Empty weight: 55 kg (121 lb)
- Gross weight: 190 kg (419 lb)
- Fuel capacity: 20 litres (4.4 imp gal; 5.3 US gal)
- Powerplant: 1 × Limbach Flugmotoren air-cooled aircraft engine, 19 kW (25 hp)
- Main rotor diameter: 6.0 m (19 ft 8 in)
- Propellers: 2-bladed wooden

Performance

- Maximum speed: 105 km/h (65 mph, 57 kn)
- Cruise speed: 75 km/h (47 mph, 40 kn)
- Rate of climb: 3.5 m/s (690 ft/min)
