= List of Grand Prix motorcycles =

The machines participating in Grand Prix motorcycle racing, since its origin in 1949, have been entered into distinct classes depending primarily on engine capacity. The smallest engines and two-stroke engines have been phased out over the years.

== MotoGP class ==
=== 1000cc (2012–present) ===
- Aprilia RS-GP
- Ducati Desmosedici
- Honda RC213V
- Honda RCV1000R
- Honda RC213V-RS
- KTM RC16
- Suzuki GSX-RR
- Yamaha YZR-M1

=== 800 cc (2007–2011) ===
- Ducati Desmosedici
- Honda RC212V
- Ilmor X3
- Kawasaki Ninja ZX-RR
- Suzuki GSV-R
- Team Roberts KR212V
- Yamaha YZR-M1

=== 990 cc (2002–2006) ===
- Aprilia RS Cube
- Ducati Desmosedici
- Harris WCM
- Honda RC211V
- Kawasaki Ninja ZX-RR
- Moriwaki MD211VF
- Proton KR5
- Proton KTM
- Suzuki GSV-R
- Team Roberts KR211V
- Yamaha YZR-M1

== 500 cc class (1949–2002) ==
- Aermacchi Ala d'Oro 402
- AJS Porcupine
- Aprilia RSW-2 500
- BMW RS500 Type 255
- BSA Gold Star
- BSL 500 V3
- Cagiva 1C2
- Cagiva 2C2
- Cagiva 3C2
- Cagiva 4C3
- Cagiva C9
- Cagiva C10
- Cagiva C587
- Cagiva C588
- Cagiva C589
- Cagiva C590
- Cagiva C591
- Cagiva C592
- Cagiva C593
- Cagiva C594
- ČZ500 V4 Type 860
- Ducati 500 GP
- ELF-Honda
- ELF 500 ROC
- Gilera 500 4C
- Gilera 500 GP
- Gilera 4
- Gilera 500 Saturno "Piuma"
- Harris-Yamaha
- Honda RC181
- Honda NR500
- Honda NS500
- Honda NSR500
- Honda NSR500V
- Honda NX500
- Honda RS500
- Horex 500
- Jawa Factory Racer
- Kawasaki H1A R
- Kawasaki H1R
- Kawasaki KR500
- LinTo 500 GP
- Matchless G50
- Modenas KR3
- Morbidelli 500
- Moto Guzzi 500 Four
- Moto Guzzi 500 3C
- Moto Guzzi V8
- MuZ 500
- MV Agusta 500 4C
- MV Agusta 500 Six
- MV Agusta 500 Three
- MV Agusta 500 Four
- Nougier 500
- Norton Manx
- Norton NRS588
- Paton 500 GP
- Paton V115
- Paton V70
- Paton PG500R
- Paton PG500RC
- Pulse 500
- ROC-Yamaha GP1
- Sabre V4
- Sanvenero 500 GP
- Seeley G50
- Suzuki TR500
- Suzuki TSR500
- Suzuki RG500
- Suzuki RGA500
- Suzuki RGB500
- Suzuki RG 500 gamma
- Suzuki RGV500
- TSR-Honda AC50M
- Velocette Thruxton
- Vincent Grey Flash
- Yamaha TZ500
- Yamaha YZR500

== 350 cc class (1949–1982) ==
- Aermacchi Ala d'Oro 350
- AJS 7R
- Bianchi 350
- ČZ 320 DOHC
- ČZ 350
- ČZ 350 V4
- Ducati 350 Desmo GP
- Harley-Davidson RR350
- Honda RC170
- Honda RC171
- Honda RC172
- Honda 2RC172
- Honda RC173
- Honda RC174
- Jawa 350 Twin
- Jawa 350 V4
- Kawasaki KR350
- MV Agusta 350 Twin
- MV Agusta 350 4C (1954–1964)
- MV Agusta 350 Six
- MV Agusta 350 3C
- MV Agusta 350 4C (1972–1976)
- MZ 350 Twin
- Norton Kneeler
- Yamaha 350 Triple
- Yamaha TZ 350
- Yamaha TR2
- Yamaha TR3
- Yamaha YZR350

== Moto2 class (2010–present) ==
- AJR Moto2
- AJR EVO 2012
- ADV AT02
- Bimota HB4
- Boscoscuro B-21
- Boscoscuro B-22
- Boscoscuro B-23
- Boscoscuro B-24
- Boscoscuro B-25
- Boscoscuro B-26
- BQR-Moto2
- Force GP210
- Forward F2
- Forward KLX
- FTR Moto M210
- FTR Moto M211
- FTR Moto M212
- FTR Moto M213
- Harris Moto2
- IAMT Moto2
- I.C.P. Textra
- Kalex Moto2
- KTM Moto2
- MIR Moto2
- Moriwaki MD600
- Motobi TSR6
- MV Agusta F2
- MZ Moto2
- NTS NH6
- NTS NH7
- Nykos Moto2
- RBB Moto2
- RSV Motor DR600
- Speed Up SF7
- Speed Up SF8
- Speed Up S12
- Speed Up SF13
- Speed Up SF14
- Speed Up SF15
- Speed Up SF16
- Speed Up SF19T
- Speed Up SF20T
- Suter MMX
- Suter MMX2
- Suter MMXI
- Suter MMXII
- TaylorMade Carbon 2
- Tech 3 Mistral 610
- Ten Kate Moto2
- TransFIORmers Moto2
- Triumph Moto2
- TSR TSR6

== 250 cc class (1949–2009) ==
- Aprilia AF1 250
- Aprilia RSV 250
- Aprilia RSW 250
- Aprilia RSA 250
- Benelli 250 DOHC
- Bianchi 250
- Bultaco 250
- ČZ 250
- Gilera 250
- Gilera GFR 250
- Harley-Davidson RR250
- Honda 220cc prototype (1954)
- Honda 250 6 Cyls
- Honda 250 4 Cyls
- Honda RC160
- Honda RC161
- Honda RC162
- Honda RC163
- Honda CR72
- Honda RC164
- Honda 3RC164
- Honda RC165
- Honda RC166
- Honda RS250R
- Honda RS250RW
- Honda NSR250
- Jawa 250 Single
- Jawa 250 Twin
- JJ-Cobas JC2
- JJ Cobas TR1
- Kawasaki KR250
- Kobas MR1
- KTM 250 FRR
- Motobi 250
- Moto Guzzi 250
- Moto Guzzi Albatross
- Moto Guzzi Gambalunghino
- Moto Guzzi Dondolino 500
- Moto Guzzi Gambalunga
- Montesa 250
- Morbidelli 250
- MV Agusta 203 Bialbero
- MV Agusta 220 Bialbero
- MV Agusta 250 Monocilindrica Bialbero
- MV Agusta 250 Bicilindrica
- MZ RZ 250 Twin
- New Imperial 250
- Ossa 250
- Puch 250
- Rudge 250 Sports
- Suzuki 250 RGV-XR Twin
- Suzuki RGV250
- Villa 250
- Walter 250
- Yamaha YD1
- Yamaha RD48
- Yamaha RD56
- Yamaha 250 Twin
- Yamaha 250 V4
- Yamaha TZ 250
- Yamaha TZR250
- Yamaha YZR250

== Moto3 class (2012–present) ==
- CFMoto Moto3
- EvL250
- FGR 250 GP
- FTR M312
- FTR M313
- FTR M314
- FTR M315
- GasGas RC250GP
- Honda NSF250R
- Honda NSF250RW
- Husqvarna FR250GP
- Ioda TR002
- Kalex KTM Moto3
- KRP M3-01
- KRP M3-02
- KTM RC250GP
- KTM RC250R
- Mahindra MGP3O
- MIR Racing Moto3
- Oral M3
- Peugeot MGP3O
- Suter MMX3
- TSR TSR3
- TSR3C
- TVR Moto3

== 125 cc class (1949–2011) ==
- Aprilia RS125R
- Aprilia RSW125
- Aprilia RSA125
- Bultaco 125
- ČZ 125
- ČZ 125 Twin
- Derbi 125 GP
- Derbi 125 V-Twin
- Gilera 125 GP
- Gilera Mosca Bianca 125
- Honda RC142
- Honda RC143
- Honda 2RC143
- Honda RC144
- Honda RC145
- Honda CR93
- Honda 2RC146
- Honda 4RC146
- Honda RC148
- Honda RC149
- Honda MT125R
- Honda RS125
- Honda RS125R
- Italjet F125
- Italjet Vampire
- Jawa 125 Twin
- JJ Cobas TB1
- JJ Cobas TB5
- JJ Cobas TB6
- JJ Cobas TB7
- KTM 125 FRR
- Loncin 125
- Lube 125
- Malaguti 125
- Maxtra 125
- Mondial 125SS
- Mondial 175 DOHC
- Morbidelli 125
- Motobécane 125
- Motobi 175
- Motobi 125
- MV Agusta 125 Motore Lungo
- MV Agusta 125 Bialbero
- MV Agusta 125 SOHC
- MV Agusta 125 Monoalbero
- MV Agusta 125 Disc Valve
- MZ RD 125 Triple
- MZ RE 125
- MZ RZ 125 Tandem
- Parilla 175 Production Racer
- Puch 125
- Suzuki 125 V4
- Yamaha RA41
- Yamaha RA75
- Yamaha RA97
- Yamaha 125 V4
- Yamaha RA31A
- Yamaha AS1
- Yamaha AS3
- Yamaha TA125
- Yamaha TZ125

== 80 cc class (1984–1989) ==
- Derbi 80 GP
- HuVo-Casal
- Zündapp RSM 80 - also as Krauser from 1985
- Gnani
- Seel
- JJ Cobas TA1
- JJ Cobas TA2
- Fantic
- LCR
- Ziegler 80 GP
- BBFT
- Unimoto
- Eberhardt

== 50 cc class (1962–1983) ==
- Bultaco TSS 50
- Derbi 50
- Ducson 50
- Gilera 4
- Honda CR110
- Honda RC110
- Honda RC111
- Honda RC112
- Honda RC113
- Honda RC114
- Honda RC115
- Honda RC116
- Itom 50
- Jamathi 50
- Kreidler 50 GP
- Kreidler 50 Van Veen
- Monark 50
- Morbidelli 50
- MZ RE 50
- Suzuki 50 Single
- Suzuki 50 Twin
- Tomos D3
- Tomos D5
- Tomos D6
- Tomos D7
- Tomos D9
- Tomos DMPG
- Tomos DMPG GP75
- Tomos DMPG GP78
- Tomos DMPG GP79
