= Yamaha TZ350 =

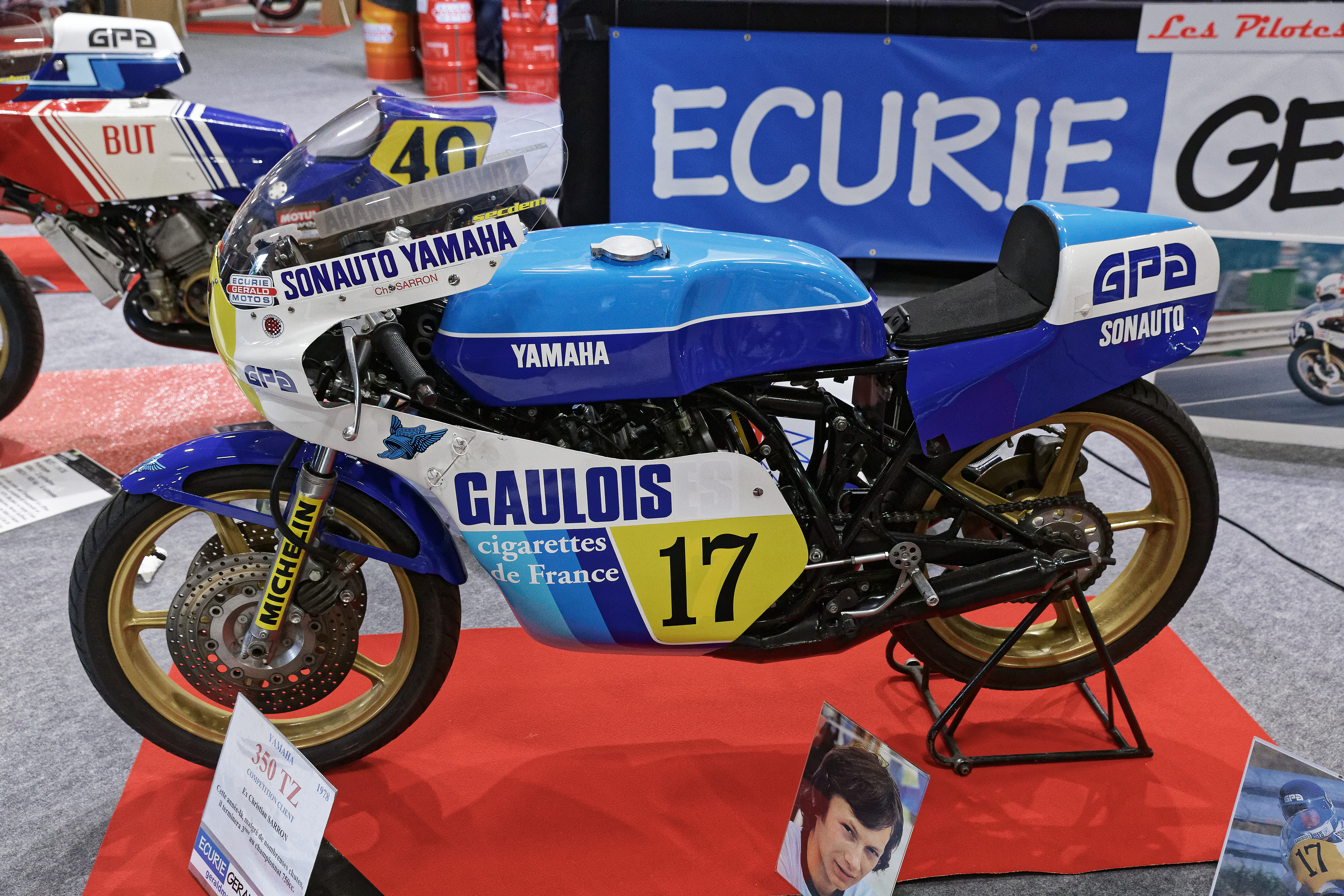
- Manufacturer: Yamaha
- Production: 1973 (TZ 350A) till 1980 (TZ 350 G)
- Class: Grand Prix motorcycle racing
- Engine: 347 cc (21.2 cu in) air-cooled, two-stroke parallel twin
- Bore / stroke: 64 mm × 54 mm (2.5 in × 2.1 in)
- Top speed: over 289 km/h (180 mph)
- Power: 60 bhp (45 kW) @ 9,500 rpm (A) to 72 bhp (54 kW) @ 11,000 rpm (H)
- Torque: 35 N⋅m (26 lbf⋅ft) @ 9,440 rpm
- Transmission: 6-speed
- Suspension: Rear: Twin Shock (A&B); Mono-Shock (C-H)
- Brakes: Front: 2 x Twin L-Shoe (A&B); Disc (since Model C); Rear:1 x Single L-Shoe (A&B) ; Disc (since Model C)
- Tires: Front: 2.75" x 18" (A&B); 3.0" x 18" (Since C); Rear: 3.0" x 18" (A-E);3.5" x 18" (F-H)
- Rake, trail: 27.5°, 4.3 inches (110 mm) (Model A-E)
- Wheelbase: 1,331 mm (52.4 in) (diff per model)
- Dimensions: L: 1,946 mm (76.6 in); W: 510 mm (20 in) (between 510 and 635)
- Weight: 115 kg (dry)
- Fuel capacity: 23 L (5.1 imp gal; 6.1 US gal)
- Related: Yamaha TZ750; Yamaha TZ250; Yamaha TZ125

The Yamaha TZ350 was a racing motorcycle produced by the Yamaha Motor Company from 1973 to 1981 for competition in the Grand Prix motorcycle racing series. The motorcycle was powered by a 350 cc two stroke engine.ACU

== Model history ==
Production of the motorcycle started in 1973 with Model A (60 bhp @9,500rpm) and ended 1981 with Model H (72 bhp @ 11,000rpm) when the GP series came to an end.

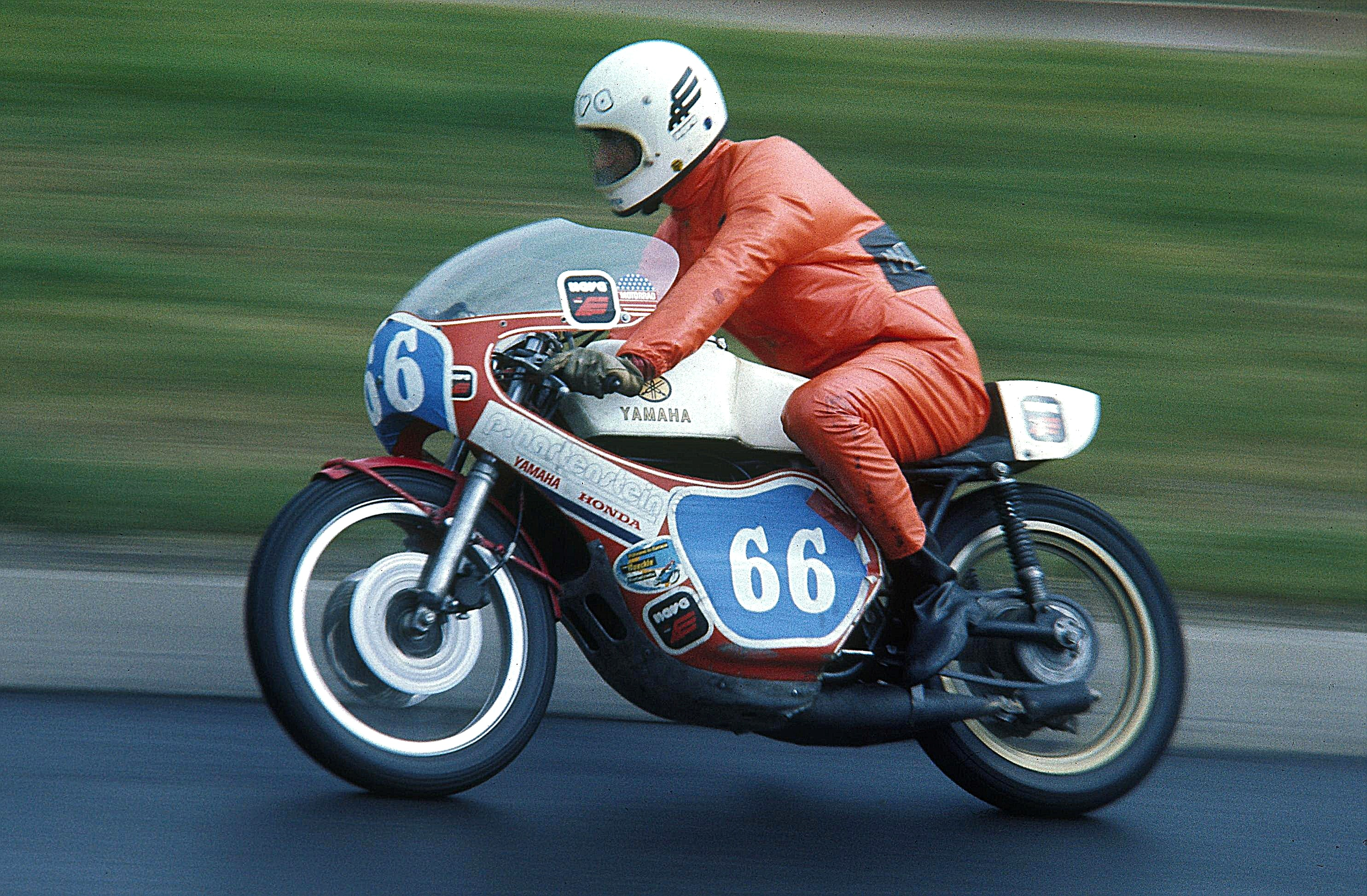
Helmut Dähne on a Yamaha TZ 350 (1976)

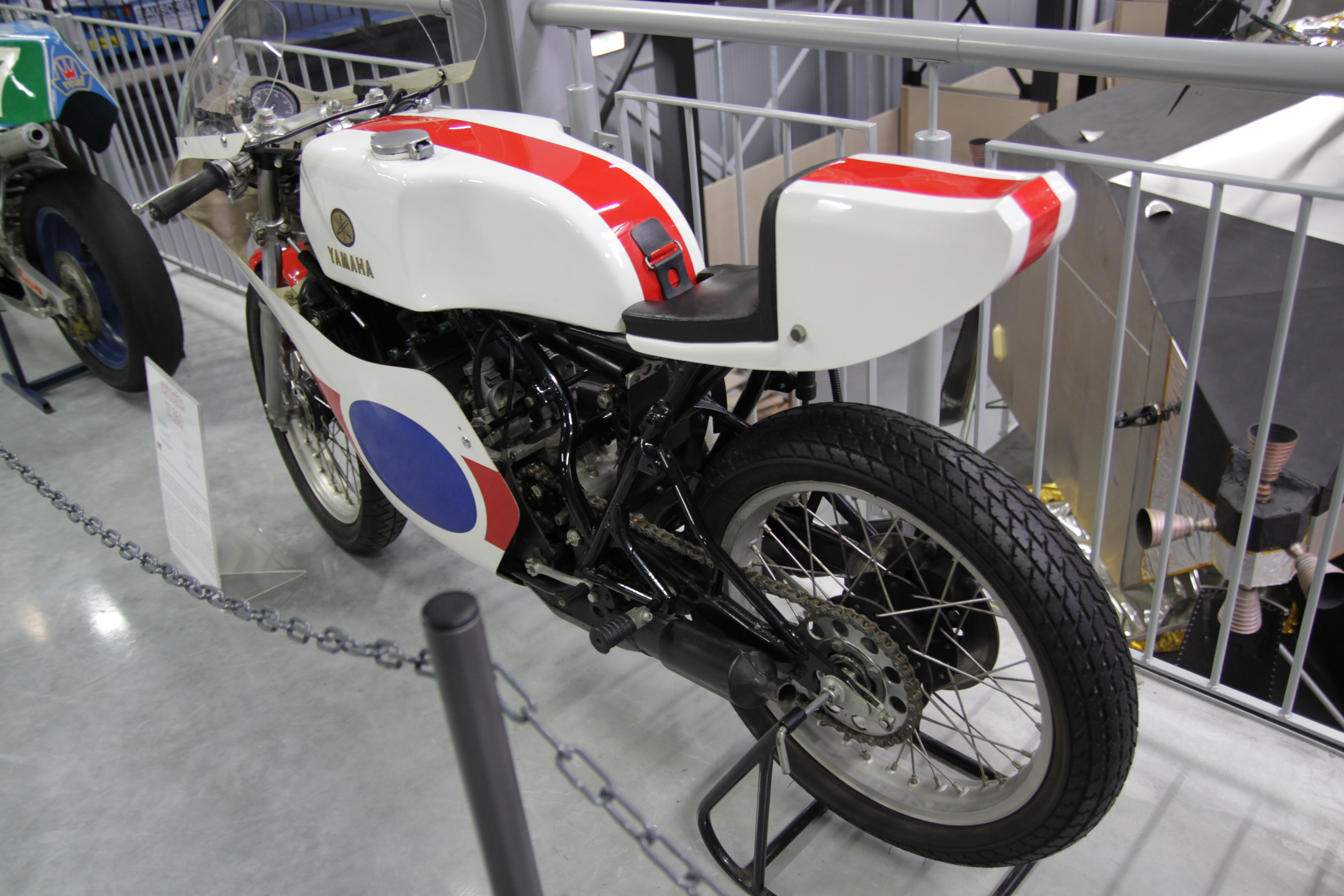
Yamaha TZ 350 (1977)

Production Racer were series manufactured racing bikes. Two Yamaha TZ 350 models are part of the motorcycle collection of the Technikmuseum Speyer.

Yamaha often leveraged the marketing of their RD and RZ series road motorcycles by referencing the TZ series. See also: RD250, RD350, RD400, RZ250, RZ350. The TZ motors provided the inspiration and engineering basis of Yamaha's contemporaneous road going two strokes.

== See also ==
- Honda RC174
- Kawasaki KR350
- MV Agusta 350 Six
