= Moto Guzzi Museum =

- The museum in 2026
- Established: June 2, 2012
- Location: Mandello del Lario, Italy
- Coordinates: 45.9151°N 9.322902°E
- Type: Transport museum
- Collection size: 150 motorcycles
- Website: www.motoguzzi.com/uk_EN/passion/Museum/

The Moto Guzzi Museum is a transport museum in Mandello del Lario, Italy. The collection includes a number of important Moto Guzzi street motorcycles and motorcycle racing machines, as well as examples of rare engines like the Moto Guzzi V8. A section of the museum is devoted to historic Guzzi racer Bill Lomas.
