= MV Agusta 500 Six =

Italian prototype racing motorcycle

MV Agusta 500 6 cilindri
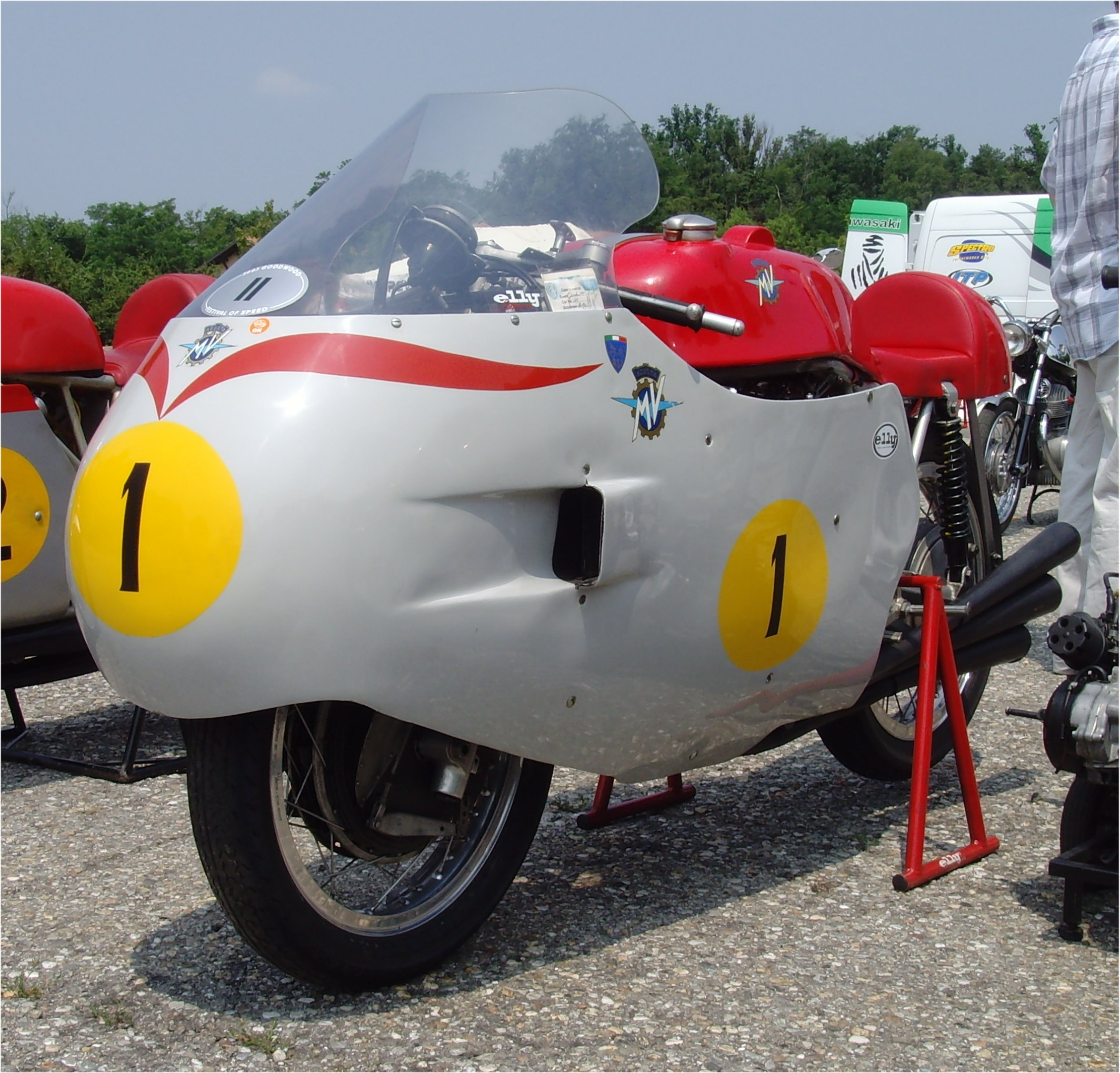
- 1958 MV Agusta 500 GP 6 Cilindri prototype
- Manufacturer: MV Agusta
- Class: Racing prototype
- Engine: 499 cc transverse DOHC in-line six-cylinder engine
- Bore / stroke: 48 mm × 46 mm (1.9 in × 1.8 in)
- Compression ratio: 10.8:1
- Top speed: 240 km/h (150 mph)
- Power: 75 bhp (56 kW) @ 15.000 rpm
- Ignition type: Lucas magneto
- Transmission: 7 speed
- Frame type: Double cradle
- Suspension: Front: Telescopic forks Rear: Swingarm with hydraulic shock absorbers
- Brakes: Front: 4 cam 260 mm drum brake Rear: 190 mm drum brake
- Tires: Front: 3,00x18 Rear: 3,50x18
- Wheelbase: 1350 mm
- Weight: 145 kg (dry)

The MV Agusta 500 6 cilindri (MV Agusta 500 6-cylinder) was a prototype racing motorcycle built by the Varese company MV Agusta in 1957. Only one prototype was made.

== Background ==
MV Agusta had won the championship in the 500, 250 and 125 cc classes of the 1956 season. However, the 1957 season promised stiff competition, especially in the premier 500 class, where the Moto Guzzi V8 and the Gilera 500 4C had shown great potential.

Undecided whether to go down the road of evolutionary refinement, as Gilera had, or innovation, like the Moto Guzzi, Count Agusta opted for a dual strategy that included the development of the victorious "500 4C" and, simultaneously, the commissioning of a new multi-cylinder engine.

== Development and Technology ==
The outline of the project was conceived in the first months of 1956. Sporting director Nello Pagani was in charge of the project, which was carried out with the maximum secrecy.

The engine had cylinders and cylinder head made of light alloy was equipped with separate cylinders with cast iron liners. Like the four-cylinder models it featured double overhead camshafts with two valves per cylinder. Six Dell'Orto SS26A carburettors were used. The frame was derived from the "500 4C": a double cradle in steel tubes, with detachable front tubes to facilitate assembly and maintenance.

Development proceeded until the machine was ready for a track test in the summer of 1957. In order to maintain total secrecy, it was Pagani himself who took on the role of test rider at the Monza circuit. The test gave encouraging results, both for handling qualities, although they needed improvement, and for the power of the engine. Its power of 75 bhp at 15,000 rpm gave a top speed of 240 km/h (150 mph).

== Racing ==
The 500 Six made its debut during practice at the 1957 Nations Grand Prix at Monza, but was not considered ready to use in the race. In 1958 it was tested at Modena and Monza by John Surtees, ahead of its official debut at the GP of Nations, the last race in the 1958 World Championship. The bike was entrusted to the British driver John Hartle who was forced to retire with a broken connecting rod after lap nineteen of the thirty-five lap race (the press were told the problem was with the gearbox).

Engine and chassis development work resumed, but the announcement of the abstention agreement had already radically changed the balance amongst teams, giving MV Agusta a position of technical supremacy that it maintained for over a decade. Surtees (as Arturo Magni revealed later) did not like the six cylinder machine which was wider and heavier than the "four".

The six-cylinder reappeared during the 1959 Nations Grand Prix practice sessions, but was not used in the race. The last evolution of the "500 6C" was prepared in the first months of 1960, but was then abandoned, given the futility of supporting its high development costs.

== Bibliography ==
- Rauch, Siegfried (1980). Berühmte Rennmotorräder (in German) (2nd ed.). Motorbuch. ISBN 978-3879435906.
- Spahn, Christian (1986). MV Agusta : Technik und Geschichte der Rennmotorräder (in German) (Aufl ed.). SERAG-AG, Verl.-Unternehmen. ISBN 978-3908007135.
