= MV Agusta 350 Six =

MV Agusta 350 6 cilindri
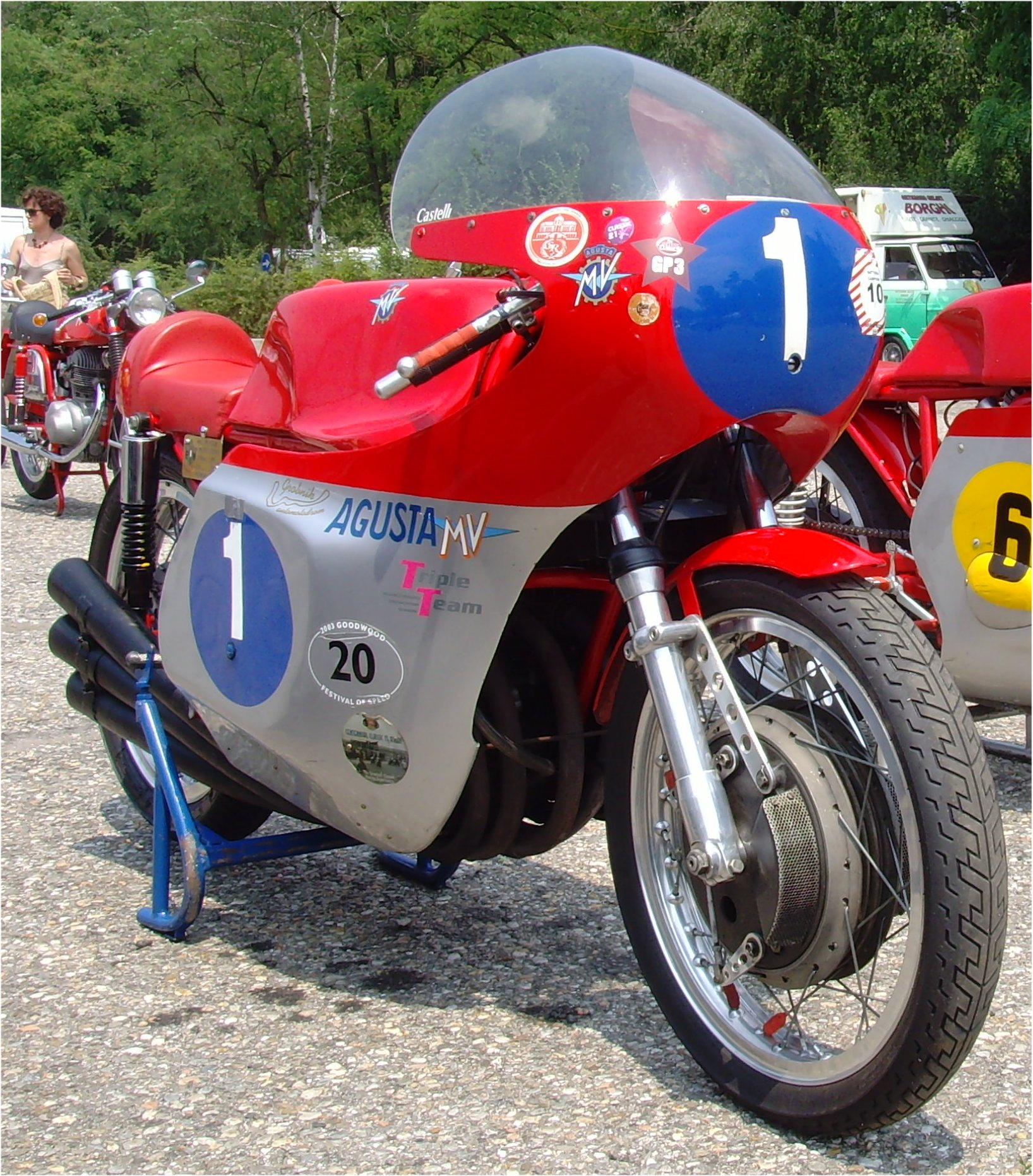
- MV Agusta 350 6C GP, 1969
- Manufacturer: MV Agusta
- Production: 1957, 1968
- Class: Racing prototype
- Engine: 349 cc transverse DOHC inline six
- Bore / stroke: 1957: 44 mm × 38.25 mm 1968: 46 mm × 35 mm
- Compression ratio: 1968: 11:1
- Top speed: 1968: 155 mph (249 km/h)
- Power: 1957: 70 bhp (52 kW) @ 16.000 rpm 1968: 75 bhp (56 kW) @ 16.000 rpm
- Transmission: Wet multi-plate clutch, Chain drive 1957: 7 speed 1968: 6 speed
- Frame type: Double cradle
- Suspension: Front: Telescopic forks Rear: Swingarm
- Brakes: 1957: Drum brakes 1968: Disc brakes

The MV Agusta 350 6 cilindri (MV Agusta 350 6-cylinder) was a prototype racing motorcycle built by the Varese company MV Agusta in 1957, for the 350 cc class of the FIM Motorcycle World Championship. The project was resurrected in 1968. Neither version was ever used in a race. The only surviving model is now in the MV Agusta factory museum.

== 1957 prototype ==
=== Background ===
MV Agusta had won the championship in the 500, 250 and 125 cc classes of the 1956 season. However, the 1957 season promised stiff competition, especially in the premier 500 class, where the Moto Guzzi V8 and the Gilera 500 4C had shown great potential.

Undecided whether to go down the road of evolutionary refinement, as Gilera had, or innovation, like the Moto Guzzi, Count Agusta opted for a dual strategy that included the development of the victorious "500 4C" and, simultaneously, the commissioning of a new multi-cylinder engine that could produce higher revs and therefore outperform the proven four-cylinder.

The outline of the project was conceived in the first months of 1956. Sporting director Nello Pagani was in charge of the project, which was carried out with the maximum secrecy.

The engine had cylinders and cylinder head made of light alloy was equipped with separate cylinders with cast iron liners. Like the four-cylinder models it featured double overhead camshafts with two valves per cylinder. Six Dell'Orto SS26A carburettors were used. The frame was derived from the "500 4C": a double cradle in steel tubes, with detachable front tubes to facilitate assembly and maintenance.

=== 350 cc version ===
The 350 cc was a logical development from the 500 cc version. The machine provided enough power, but this did not outweigh the extra weight. The twin camshaft engine (the camshafts were driven by spur gears between cylinders 3 and 4) had two valves per cylinder. The bore was 44 mm and the stroke 38.25 mm. Six Dell'Orto carburetor supplied the mixture which was ignited from a Lucas magneto. A Double cradle frame was used, the lower tubes of which could be detached for easy removal of the engine.

In 1957, the six-cylinder 350 cc was used only once, in practice for the 1957 Grand Prix of Nations in Monza by Nello Pagani. After Moto Guzzi, Gilera and Mondial retired from racing at the end of the 1957 season, the project was shelved.

== 1968 prototype ==
=== Background ===
The remarkable success of the two-stroke Yamaha twins had greatly impressed Count Agusta who, at the end of the 1967 season, needed to find a counter to the predictable supremacy of Japanese motorcycles in the years to come.

Discarding the idea of a two-stroke engine, considered unsuitable for the prestige of the brand, the best solution seemed to him to further split the 4-stroke engine, doubling the number of cylinders the "350 3C", following the example of the fearsome Honda RC174 with which Mike Hailwood had won the 350 class in the 1967 World Championship.

=== Development ===
Taking advantage of the past experience of the "350 six cylinder", abandoned in the previous decade, the MV technicians quickly prepared a prototype, following the same six-cylinder DOHC, light alloy format, but with a new 4-valve head. The engine now had a 46 mm bore and a 35 mm stroke.

To overcome the previous problems due to overheating of the lubricant, a radiator was provided for cooling the oil. The chassis included the best components from specialists, such as the Borrani wheel rims, Ceriani brakes and suspension.

Equipped with the 7-speed gearbox and six Dell'Orto SS16 carburettors, the prototype had a dry weight of 149 kg and developed a power of 75 bhp 75 bhp (56 kW) @ 16.000 rpm, giving a top speed of 155 mph (249 km/h).

Mike Hailwood rode this bike in 1968 at Monza in testing.

The bike was tested in the early months of 1969 by Giacomo Agostini at Modena, who rejected it due to the heavy weight, the difficulty in tuning and, above all, the increased width. Despite the great power, the greater weight and frontal area entailed a noticeable decrease in manoeuvrability and cornering; qualities on which the Brescia-born champion based his driving style.

Agostini's rejection of the prototype and refusal to participate in its development gave the company management serious problem. In other circumstances, as had previously happened, any rider who had refused to follow the instructions of the MV team would have been replaced immediately, but Agostini now drew the favour and admiration of a good part of the sports audience from all over Europe and moreover, he had won six world titles with the MV, some of which were taken from Mike Hailwood and his Hondas.

Not being able to fire him and, at the same time, not wanting to abandon the project, the decision was taken to recruit a second driver with good technical knowledge and a decidedly aggressive driving style. Angelo Bergamonti was hired for development of the six-cylinder prototype and to be a teammate to Agostini in the World Championship.

In 1970 a single 350 6C bike was built in the motorcycle workshop. It was continuously developed, but was not obtaining the desired results, precisely because of the defects already identified by Agostini who in that year, achieved double success in the 350 and 500 championships with the "tricilindriche". Giacomo Agostini tested it again in 1971 while testing in Modena.

=== Abandonment ===
The development of the "350 6C" continued into the first months of 1971, to be finally abandoned after the opening race of the Temporada Romagnola, in which Bergamonti lost his life, and new regulations that limited the maximum number of cylinders to four in the world championship.

== See also ==
- MV Agusta 350 racers

== Bibliography ==
- Colombo, Mario; Patrignani, Roberto (2000). Moto MV Agusta. Giorgio Nada Editore. ISBN 9788879111805.
- Piggott, David; Taulbut, Derek. "Grand Prix Motorcycle Engine Development, 1949 – 2008" (PDF).
- Rauch, Siegfried (1980). Berühmte Rennmotorräder (in German) (2nd ed.). Motorbuch. ISBN 978-3879435906.
- Spahn, Christian (1986). MV Agusta : Technik und Geschichte der Rennmotorräder (in German) (Aufl ed.). SERAG-AG, Verl.-Unternehmen. ISBN 978-3908007135.
- Walker, Mick (2002). Mick Walker's Japanese Grand Prix Racing Motorcycles. Redline Books. ISBN 9780953131181.
