= Yamaha TZ750 =

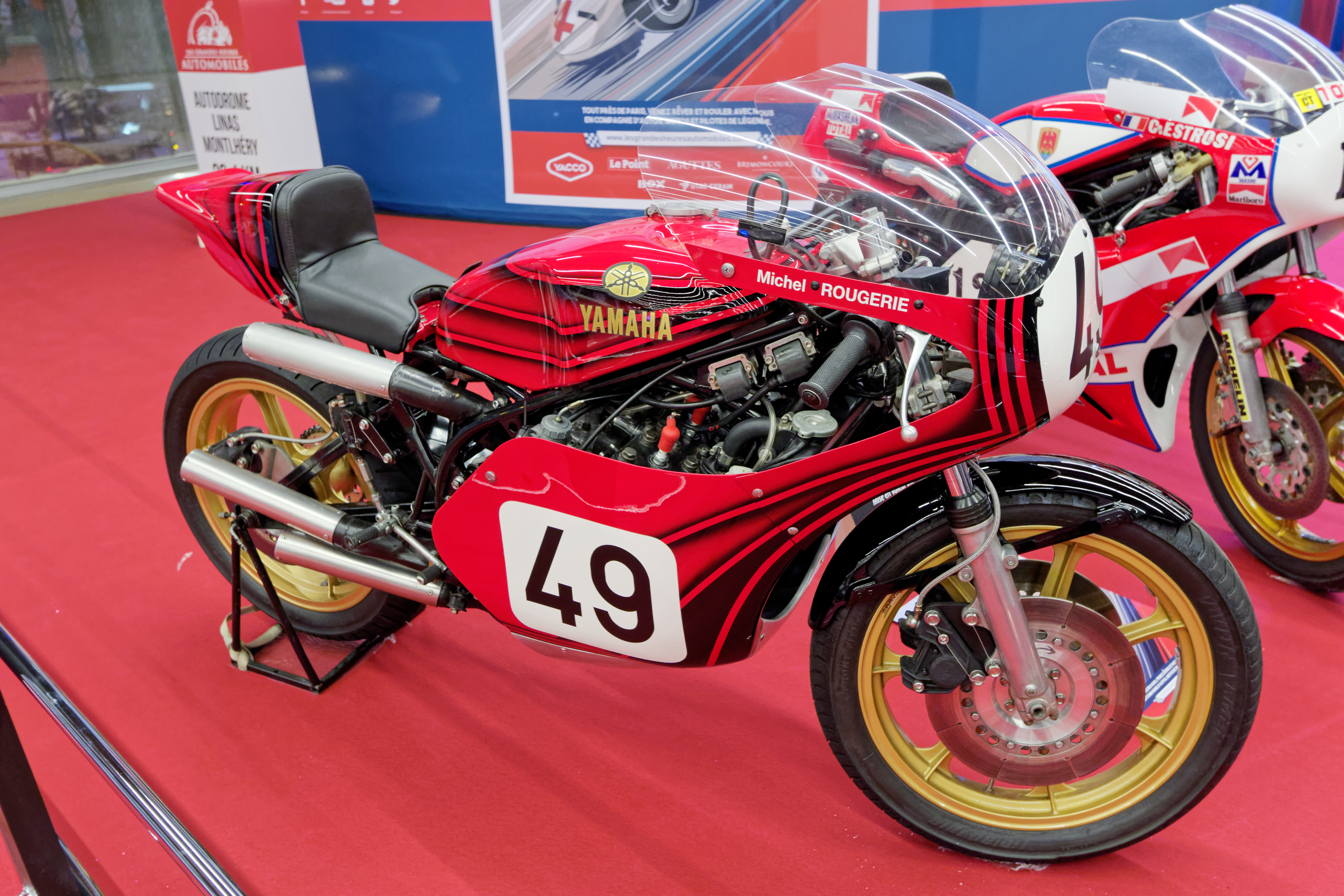
- Yamaha TZ750 (1977)
- Manufacturer: Yamaha Motor Company
- Production: 1974–1979
- Engine: 747 cc (45.6 cu in) two-stroke inline-4
- Bore / stroke: 66.4 mm × 54 mm (2.61 in × 2.13 in)
- Power: 120 hp (89 kW) @ 10,500 rpm
- Wheelbase: 1,390 mm (55 in)
- Weight: 152 kg (335 lb) (dry)
- Related: Yamaha TZ350; Yamaha TZ250; Yamaha TZ125

The Yamaha TZ750 is a series production two-stroke race motorcycle built by Yamaha to compete in the Formula 750 class in the 1970s. Motorcyclist called it "the most notorious and successful roadracing motorcycle of the 1970s". Another journal called it the dominant motorcycle of the era, noting its nine consecutive Daytona 200 wins, starting in 1974.

Another triumph of note was when Joey Dunlop rode to victory in the 1980 Classic TT during the process of which he upped the lap record on the Snaefell Mountain Course to an average speed of 115.22 mph (185.43 km/h). This is also the fastest recorded lap of the Mountain Course by a Yamaha 750cc two-stroke machine.

It was rated by journalist Kevin Cameron as one of the five most influential motorcycle designs: its monoshock suspension, high-strength frame and wide tires were necessary to handle the high engine output, and became standard for sportbikes.

Twin TZ750 engines powered the Silver Bird motorcycle land-speed record setting streamliner motorcycle, the first to break 300 miles per hour (480 km/h).

== Specifications ==
	TZ 750 A	TZ 750 B	TZ 750 C	TZ 750 D	TZ 750 E	TZ 750 F
Year	1974	1975	1976	1977	1978	1979
Displacement	694 cm^{3}	747 cm^{3}	747 cm^{3}	747 cm^{3}	747 cm^{3}	747 cm^{3}
Bore/stroke	64 × 54 mm	66,4 × 54 mm	66,4 × 54 mm	66,4 × 54 mm	66,4 × 54 mm	66,4 × 54 mm
Power	90 PS (89 hp) @ 10,500 RPM	90 PS (89 hp) @ 10,500 RPM	90 PS (89 hp) @ 10,500 RPM	120 PS (120 hp) @ 10,500 RPM	120 PS (120 hp) @ 11,000 RPM	120 PS (120 hp) @ 11,000 RPM
Wheelbase	1407 mm	1407 mm	1407 mm	1390 mm	1390 mm	1390 mm
Steering angle (grad)	63	63	63	64	64	64
Trail in mm				97	97	97
Dry weight in kg	157	157	157	152	152	152
Production (units)	213	46	40	30	162	76

== Museum examples ==
A 1974 example is displayed in the Communication Plaza at the corporate headquarters of the Yamaha Motor Company in Iwata, Shizuoka, Japan. Another 1974 TZ750A is at the Barber Vintage Motorsports Museum in Alabama.

== See also ==
- Kawasaki H2R
- BSA/Triumph racing triples
