= Yamaha RA75 =

- Manufacturer: Yamaha
- Production: 1963
- Class: 125cc
- Engine: 125 cc single-cylinder 2-stroke
- Power: 25 bhp (19 kW) @ 12,000 rpm
- Transmission: 6-speed
- Suspension: Telescopic hydraulic fork (front) dual-shock absorbers with adjustable preload (rear)
- Brakes: Drum brakes

The Yamaha RA75 is a racing motorcycle produced by Yamaha, for the 125cc class of Grand Prix motorcycle racing, in 1963.

== RA 75 ==
After Yamaha did not appear in the 125cc world championship competitions in 1962, the RA75 was presented in 1963 which, compared to the previous one, had a slight increase in stroke and an increase in power to 25 hp delivered at a higher rpm. high, at 12,000 rpm; the gearbox was also brought to 8 reports. It was the last series equipped with a single-cylinder engine.
