= MV Agusta 350 racers =

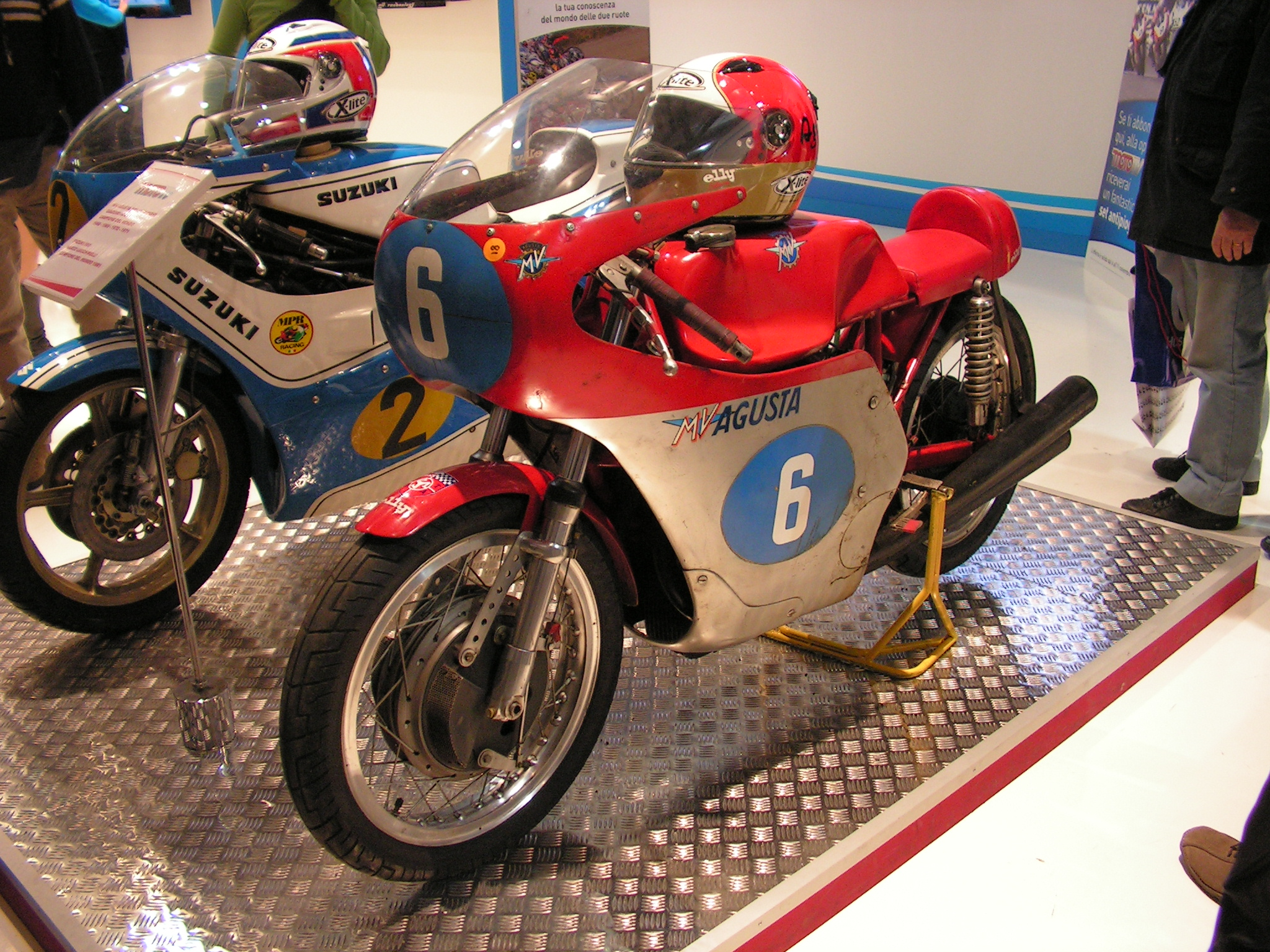
- Angelo Bergamonti's 1970 MV Agusta 350 3C
- Manufacturer: MV Agusta
- Production: 1954–1976
- Class: Racer
- Engine: 350 cc

The MV Agusta 350 cc racers were motorcycles produced by MV Agusta between 1954 and 1976 and raced in the 350 cc motorcycle GP championships. 10 world titles were achieved by riders John Surtees, Gary Hocking and Giacomo Agostini on these machines.

== MV Agusta 350 4C 1954–1964 ==
Count Domenico Agusta never released technical data of his machines and personnel, technical staff and riders were forbidden to divulge anything about the machines. Because a number of newer machines were later sold through auctions, data is known about these, but the machines from the early years sometimes remain a mystery. Of the original 350 4C is really only known that it was a reduced version of the MV Agusta 500 4C. Designer Piero Remor initially provided that machine with experimental and often useless technology, but rider Leslie Graham made some improvements. In 1953 that machine had a telescopic forks and a double cradle frame. It had a Four-stroke transverse in-line four-cylinder engine with DOHC with two valves per cylinder.

=== Technical data MV Agusta 350 4C 1954–1964 ===
| MV Agusta 350 4C | 1954 | 1955 | 1956 | 1957 | 1958 | 1959 | 1960 | 1961 | 1962 | 1963 | 1964 |
|---|---|---|---|---|---|---|---|---|---|---|---|
| Valvetrain | DOHC with two valves per cylinder | | | | | | | | | | |
| Engine configuration | Four-stroke transverse in-line four-cylinder engine | | | | | | | | | | |
| Engine cooling | Air cooling | | | | | | | | | | |
| Bore | 47.5 mm | | | | | | | | | | |
| Stroke | 49.3 mm | | | | | | | | | | |
| Engine displacement | 349 cc | | | | | | | | | | |
| Lubrication system | Wet sump | | | | | | | | | | |
| Carburetors | 4 Dell'Orto SSI 28A | | | | | | | | | | |
| Max power | c. 40 bhp (30 kW) | 50 bhp (37 kW) @ 12,000 rpm | | | | | | | | | |
| Top speed | 210 km/h (130 mph) | | | | | | | | | | |
| Primary drive | Gear | | | | | | | | | | |
| Clutch | Wet multi-plate | | | | | | | | | | |
| Gears | 5 | | | | | | | | | | |
| Final drive | Chain drive | | | | | | | | | | |
| Frame | Double cradle | | | | | | | | | | |
| Front forks | Telescopic forks | | | | | | | | | | |
| Rear forks | Swingarm | | | | | | | | | | |
| Brakes | Drum brakes | | | | | | | | | | |

=== Results 1954–1964 ===
1954

Bill Lomas and Dickie Dale received MV Agustas for the 500 cc Senior TT on the Isle of Man, but also started with the 350 cc version in the Junior TT. It was not a success: Lomas was only 7th and Dale was 25th. For the time being, MV Agusta still had to bow to the AJS 7R and the Norton Manx.

1955

In 1955 the 350 cc MV Agustas did not start in GPs, possibly because they were concentrating on the 250 cc class.

1956

When John Surtees came to MV Agusta in 1956, he brought his knowledge of the Norton Featherbed frame with him. The improvements to the 500 cc MV Agusta were also applied to the 350 cc four-cylinder. Surtees finished second in the 350 cc TT in Assen and won the Grand Prix of Belgium, but after a nasty fall in the Grand Prix of Germany, breaking an arm, he was eliminated for the rest of the season. Umberto Masetti rode a send MV in the Belgian and Nations Grand Prix at Monza. Carlo Bandirola also raced an MV at Monza. Surtees finished fourth in the 350 cc world championship.

1957

Surtees drove the MV Agusta 350 four-cylinder in almost all the 1957 GPs, but the machine was hopelessly unreliable. He finished fourth in the Junior TT, but dropped out in five other GPs. He finished 10th in the Championship.

1958

At the end of 1957, the Italian brands Gilera, FB Mondial, Moto Guzzi and MV Agusta announced that they would stop road racing. Racing was simply too expensive, especially for the companies that had to live off motorcycle sales. For Count Domenico Agusta however, the situation was different. He earned his money by building helicopters and motorcycles were just a hobby. With the loss of the biggest competitors (the British brands had stopped earlier), the fortunes for MV Agusta turned. The development of new prototypes was stopped, because it was clear that the four-cylinder MV Agusta would now be strong enough for the world title. That turned out to be the case in 1958: the brand won all the world titles in the solo classes, including the manufacturer's titles. Surtees won all six 350 cc races he started in, and won the championship. John Hartle was runner-up in the world championship as MV's second rider.

1959

In 1959 John Surtees won all six of the GPs and the Championship. Again his teammate John Hartle was runner-up in the world championship.

1960

The 1960 season was exciting due to the battle between the two teammates from MV Agusta, John Surtees and Gary Hocking. Both riders finished with 22 points. They both had two wins and one second place. Surtees had also achieved third place, which made Surtees world champion. At the end of the season John Surtees left to pursue a Formula One career.

1961

In 1961, Gary Hocking was the sole rider for MV Agusta in the 350 cc class. He skipped the first race (Germany) but then started collecting points. He was second in the Junior TT, and this was followed by victories in the Netherlands, the GDR, Ulster and Italy. He missed the last Grand Prix in Sweden, as his world title was already won by then.

1962

In 1961 Honda had not competed in the 350 cc class, but for the 1962 season the Honda RC 162 was bored out to 284.5 cc and designated RC 170. Bob McIntyre and Tom Phillis rode the machine in the Junior TT. Phillis crashed during that race and McIntyre retired. Mike Hailwood won the race with the MV Agusta. He was second in the TT of Assen and the Grand Prix of the GDR, but the Hondas won all the races and Jim Redman (Honda) became world champion ahead of Tommy Robb (Honda) and Mike Hailwood (MV Agusta).

1963

Honda took a step back in 1963 and no new models were introduced. After the Ulster GP the mechanics were called back to Japan. Hailwood then won in the GDR and in Finland, but by then the world title was already decided in favour of Jim Redman and Honda.

1964

In 1964, MV Agusta focused primarily on the 500 cc class, where there was still no significant opposition. In the 350 cc class, Hailwood only started in Assen where he finished second.

== MV Agusta 350 3C 1965–1973 ==
In 1965 the new three-cylinder MV Agusta appeared. Count Agusta had wanted a 350 cc three-cylinder because he was impressed by the three-cylinder two-stroke DKW RM 350. Arturo Magni and designer Mario Rossi tried to dissuade him, but the count insisted. He even suggested adding an extra cylinder to the MV Agusta 250 Bicilindrica. When the three-cylinder engine seemed ready, Count Agusta was displeased because there were only two valves per cylinder. Within a week the technicians converted the engine to four valves per cylinder and that immediately yielded an extra 6 horsepower. In 1966 a version with the engine enlarged to 420 cc was produced for the 500 cc class.

=== Technical data MV Agusta 350 3C ===
| MV Agusta 350 3C | 1965 | 1966 | 1967 | 1968 | 1969 | 1970 | 1971 | 1972 | 1973 |
|---|---|---|---|---|---|---|---|---|---|
| Valvetrain | DOHC with four valves per cylinder | | | | | | | | |
| Engine configuration | Four-stroke transverse in-line three-cylinder engine | | | | | | | | |
| Engine cooling | Air cooling | | | | | | | | |
| Bore | 56 mm | | | | | | | | |
| Stroke | 47.2 mm | | | | | | | | |
| Engine displacement | 349 cc | | | | | | | | |
| Lubrication system | Wet sump | | | | | | | | |
| Carburetors | 3 x Dell'Orto 28 mm | | | | | | | | |
| Max power | 65 bhp (48 kW) @ 13.500 tpm | | | | 68 bhp (51 kW) @ 14.000 - 15.000 rpm | | | | |
| Top speed | 270 km/h (170 mph) | | | | | | | | |
| Primary drive | Gears | | | | | | | | |
| Clutch | Dry multi-plate | | | | | | | | |
| Gears | 7 | | | | 6 | | | | |
| Final drive | Chain Drive | | | | | | | | |
| Frame | Double cradle | | | | | | | | |
| Front forks | Telescopic fork | | | | | | | | |
| Rear forks | Swingarm | | | | | | | | |
| Brakes | Drum brakes | | | | | | | | |

=== Results 1965–1973 ===
1965

In 1965 MV Agusta used the new 350 three-cylinder engine, but reliability was a problem. MV had two top drivers: Mike Hailwood and Giacomo Agostini, who took points off each other, while Honda put everything on Jim Redman. In the first 350 cc race of 1965 at the Nürburgring, Agostini won ahead of his teammate Hailwood and Gustav Havel on a Jawa, while Redman (Honda) crashed in the rain and broke his collarbone. During the Junior TT, Redman was out for his third win in a row, but Hailwood led by 20 seconds after the opening round with the new MV three-cylinder. He then made a long pit stop, allowing Redman to take the lead. The MV Agusta of Hailwood stopped at Sarah's Cottage on the fourth lap, giving Redman the win. Phil Read was second with the 250 cc Yamaha and Agostini took third place after Derek Woodman with the MZ had dropped out on the final lap.

In Assen, Redman won again, with Hailwood in second and Agostini in third. In East Germany, both Hailwood and Agostini dropped out. Redman won the race, Woodman (MZ) came in second and Havel came in third (Jawa). In Czechoslovakia, both MV Agustas dropped out again. Redman won again from Woodman. After two races without points, MV Agusta didn't enter the 350 cc race at the Ulster Grand Prix. In retrospect, this turned out to have been a major mistake as Honda did not enter either. MV Agusta didn't intend on travelling to the Finnish Grand Prix, but when Redman broke his collarbone again in Ulster, MV seized the advantage and took part. Agostini won the 350 cc race ahead of Honda's second man Bruce Beale. Honda blundered by letting Redman know that there would be no motorcycles at Monza, so he stayed in his native Rhodesia. In the end it turned out that a 350 cc Honda was ready for Redman in Monza, but it remained on the sidelines. Agostini won the race, which started dry. It rained in the final laps, causing Hailwood to fall. Just like in the 125cc class, two drivers were on 32 points before the start of the 350 cc race in Suzuka: Jim Redman and Giacomo Agostini. An exciting race for the world title was expected, but Agostini's engine started running poorly due to a broken Contact breaker spring. Hailwood took the lead and Redman was content to follow having been stung above his eye by a bee just before the start and his eye was almost closed. Second place was enough for Redman to win the world title.

1966

Mike Hailwood switched to Honda for 1966. At the season open race in the 350 cc class, the German Grand Prix at Hockenheimring, Giacomo Agostini retired and Mike Hailwood won on the Honda RC 173. In France, Hailwood won again, with Agostini 20 seconds behind. At Assen, Hailwood set a new lap record in practice, a full second faster than his own record lap from 1965 that he had set on a 500 cc MV Agusta. In the race, in conditions of rain and wind, Hailwood won with Agostini 45.2 seconds behind. In the GDR, Hailwood was entered in the 250, 350 and 500 cc classes. This would have involved riding more than 500 km in one day, which was not allowed. Hailwood had to replace the Jim Redman in the 500 cc class and, because he had won all the previous races in the 350 cc class, he dropped this class. Agostini won the race comfortably without the opposition from Honda.

A close battle between Hailwood and Agostini took place in Czechoslovakia, with Hailwood eventually coming out on top. The 350 cc race in Imatra, Finland, was won by Hailwood, while Agostini dropped out. The 350 cc Ulster Grand Prix started in the rain and Hailwood won comfortably. With this victory, Hailwood had secured his seventh world title. The Hailwood Honda did not go well during the Junior TT. At Ballacraine, 13 km into the race, he was overtaken by Agostini who started 20 seconds after him. Agostini won the race. At Monza, Hailwood didn't start and Agostini won his 3rd victory of the season.

1967

Only MV Agusta and Benelli brought full 350 cc machines into the 1967 season. Honda used the RC 174, a 250 cc six-cylinder bored to 297 cc. Hailwood won the German 350 cc Grand Prix with Giacomo Agostini almost a minute behind on his MV Agusta. After the first lap of the Junior TT, Hailwood had 48 seconds over Agostini, and by the end of the race more than three minutes lead. Hailwood won again in Assen, at the Sachsenring and at Brno securing the world title. In Ulster, Hailwood concentrated on the classes in which he was not yet a world champion, the 250 and 500 cc, and Ralph Bryans rode his six-cylinder Honda. Bryans led for five laps, but was passed by Agostini, who quickly established a lead. Now that the title had been decided in favour of Honda, the 350 cc race at Monza was more for the Italian honour for Agostini and Renzo Pasolini (Benelli). They fought a hard fight, but for second place as Ralph Bryans was already way out in front on the Honda. Agostini did not start in Japan.

1968

Honda withdrew from racing after the 1967 season and again, as in 1958, MV Agusta had little opposition in the 1968 season. Honda had paid Hailwood £50,000 not to ride for another team. Renzo Pasolini on the Benelli was the nearest competitor, but Agostini won all seven Grands Prix, sometimes lapping the whole field.

1969

In 1969 Yamaha had its TR 2 ready, but the machine did not pose a threat to Agostini with his MV Agusta. Bill Ivy started the new Jawa 350 cc V4. The Jawa was fast, but less reliable and Ivy crashed and was killed during practice for the DDR. Agostini won the first eight races, but because Count Agusta did not agree with the move of the GP des Nations to Imola, he did not ride there. This allowed Phil Read to win on the Yamaha. In Opatija, Agostini didn't start and Silvio Grassetti won on the Jawa V4.

1970

MV Agusta was dominant in the 1970 season. Agostini won all races in the 350 and 500 cc classes except the last race in Spain. His new teammate Angelo Bergamonti won both classes there.

1971

The 1971 season started sadly for MV Agusta, when Angelo Bergamonti was killed in a crash during the spring race in Riccione. Agostini won in Austria, Germany, the Netherlands, the GDR, Finland and Sweden. His machine suffered breakdowns at the Isle of Man TT, Czechoslovakia and in Italy (where Alberto Pagani rode the machines that had been intended for Angelo Bergamonti). Agostini did not compete at Ulster and Spain, but his six wins gave him the championship. Yamaha were beginning to mount a strong challenge in the form of Jarno Saarinen in the new Yamaha TR3. His first 350 cc Grand Prix was in Czechoslovakia after Agostini's motorcycle had a mechanical failure. He then finished second to Agostini in the Finnish Grand Prix before winning the Nations Grand Prix in Italy. Saarinen finished second to Agostini in the 350 cc Championship.

== MV Agusta 350 4C 1972–1976 ==
With the two-stroke Yamahas rapidly challenging MV Agusta's dominance, more power was needed from the engine. The three cylinder engine was at the limit of its development, so leading engineer Ruggero Mazza designed an ultra-short-stroke (54 x 38mm) inline-four that safely revved to 16,500 rpm. To offset the weight of the complex engine compared to the simpler Yamaha twins, the cycle parts were made as light as possible. The frame, designed by Arturo Magni was made of titanium. Magnesium forks were sourced from Ceriani and magnesium cast wheels from Morris. Disc brakes were used front and rear.

=== Technical data MV Agusta 350 4C 1972–1976 ===
| MV Agusta 350 4C | 1972 | 1973 | 1974 | 1975 | 1976 |
|---|---|---|---|---|---|
| Valvetrain | DOHC with four valves per cylinder | | | | |
| Engine configuration | Four-stroke transverse in-line four-cylinder engine | | | | |
| Engine cooling | Air cooling | | | | |
| Bore | 54 mm | | | | |
| Stroke | 38.2 mm | | | | |
| Engine displacement | 349.8 cc | | | | |
| Lubrication system | Wet sump | | | | |
| Carburetors | 4 x Dell'Orto 34 mm | | | | |
| Max power | 77 bhp (57 kW) @ 16.400 rpm | | | | |
| Primary drive | Gear | | | | |
| Clutch | Dry multi-plate | | | | |
| Gears | 6 | | | | |
| Final drive | Chain drive | | | | |
| Frame | Double cradle | | | | |
| Front forks | Telescopic fork | | | | |
| Rear forks | Swingarm | | | | |
| Brakes | Disc brakes | | | | |

=== Results 1972–1976 ===
1972

The 1972 season did not start well for MV Agusta. In the opening race Germany, Agostini was defeated by Saarinen in a direct head-to-head. With his new water-cooled Yamaha YZ 634, Saarinen set a new absolute lap record. In France, the difference in weight between the water-cooled Yamaha YZ 634 (approx. 90 kilos) and the MV Agusta 350 3C (approx. 140 kilos). Saarinen won and Teuvo Länsivuori on an air-cooled Yamaha TR 3 finished second, 1½ minutes behind Saarinen. Renzo Pasolini on the Aermacchi-Harley-Davidson was third and Agostini forth. He took his loss, however, sportingly, but stated that the three-cylinder MV Agusta had become too slow.

After two wins for Yamaha, Agostini came to Austria with the new MV Agusta 350 4C. In the race, the Saarinen's engine lost some power, leaving him in fourth place. Agostini won the race. MV Agusta hired Phil Read to support Agostini in Imola. Agostini won the race, but the star of the race for the Italian home crowd was Renzo Pasolini on the Aermacchi-Harley-Davidson. Pasolini had a bad start and was tenth after the first lap, but fought through the field to finish second. Read finished fourth. In the Junior TT, where Saarinen refused to ride due to the risks, Agostini led from start to finish, while his team-mate Phil Read dropped out on the second lap with shift problems. Both MV drivers rode the three-cylinder machines.

Agostini dropped out in the Yugoslavia GP. Phil Read finished the race, but could not keep up with the Yamaha TR 3 of the Hungarian János Drapál. Read finished third. In Assen, Agostini won after a fight with Drapál, Pasolini and Read. (Agostini was on the four-cylinder, Read on the three-cylinder). Agostini dropped out in the GDR, but Phil Read now also had a four-cylinder MV Agusta at his disposal and won, setting a new lap record. His time was the same as that of Agostini in the 500 cc race.

In Brno, Agostini fell, leaving Read in the lead. Saarinen passed Read to win the race. In Anderstorp, Agostini and Read fought hard in the first laps against Jarno Saarinen. Agostini took the lead and retained it throughout the race. Agostini's sixth win in Finland gave him the 1972 world title, with Saarinen in second place.

1973

For 1973, Phil Read was given contract with MV Agusta, but as No 2 rider to Agostini. Yamaha withdrew from the 350 cc class, concentrating on the 250 and 500 cc classes with Jarno Saarinen and Hideo Kanaya, but when Saarinen died in Monza, the factory team was withdrawn. Some privateers contested the 350 cc class with Yamaha TZ 350s. Due to the poor reliability of the MV Agusta 350 4C, even in 1973, the team sometimes rode the "old" three-cylinder.

Agostini led the opening race in France race from start to finish Phil Read came second. Although it had been sunny in Austria during practice, race day was wet. Phil Read retired because of a problem with his visor. Agostini built up a large lead over János Drapál, but on the penultimate lap the MV Agusta stopped due to water in the ignition, giving the victory to Drapál. In Germany, the Harley-Davidson factory team was missing, working hard on getting water-cooled machines ready. In the practice sessions private driver John Dodds (Yamaha TZ 350) was fastest. In the race Read fell on the fifth lap and on the eleventh lap the same happened to Agostini whilst he was in the lead. Teuvo Länsivuori won the race.

The 350 cc race in Monza was initially quite exciting. The Harley-Davidson team had skipped the German GP to work on the new water-cooled machines and that paid off: Pasolini was less than a second slower than Agostini in practice. The race was initially led by Agostini and Read, but Read went into the pit with a bad running engine and Agostini won. Read, Agostini and Länsivuoridid not race in Yugoslavia, where János Drapál won. The 350 cc race in Assen led to a great fight between Agostini, Read and Länsivuori, until the latter had problems with his gearbox and had to quit. Agostini won with a 0.1 second lead over Read and Länsivuori was still third. Länsivuori won the 350 cc GP of Czechoslovakia with a big lead over Agostini and Read and also in Sweden, Länsivuori won, while Agostini came in second and Phil Read third. In Imatra, Agostini used the four-cylinder again. Teuvo Länsivuori had to win this race to still have a chance of winning the world title, but he was expertly kept in third place by Phil Read, who thus allowed Agostini to stay on top. In the end Länsivuori fell on the 9th lap and so Agostini was able to grab first place and the 350 cc world title.

1974

Giacomo Agostini left for the Yamaha team at the end of 1973 and Phil Read became No 1 at MV Agusta. He was supported by Franco Bonera, but only in the 500 cc class. MV Agusta started the first three races in the 350 cc class, but withdrew from the fourth race, the GP des Nations. The MV Agusta 350 4C was considered uncompetitive and a new machine that was under development was by no means ready. Read did not finish in any race and MV Agusta remained without points in the 350 cc class.

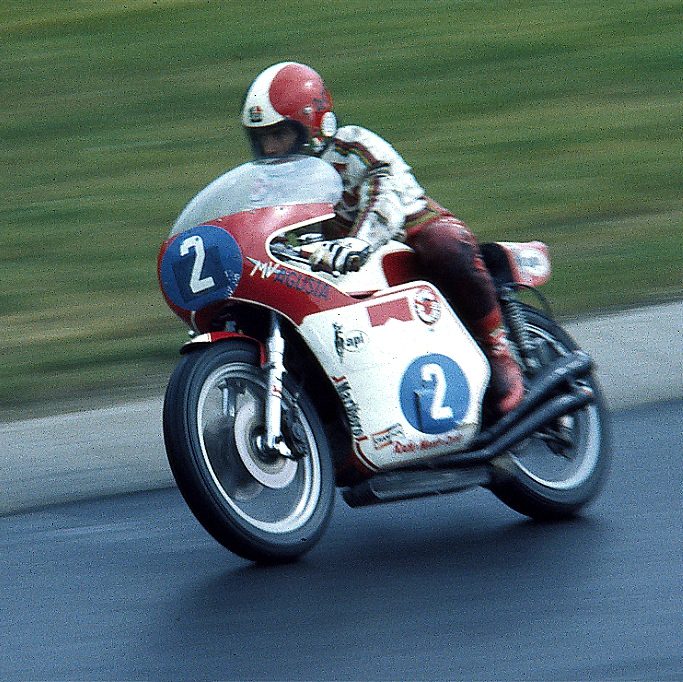
Giacomo Agostini on the 350 cc MV Agusta during practice for the 1976 West German Grand Prix at the Nürburgring.

1975

In 1975 the MV Agusta 350 cc racers were not entered.

1976

For the 1976 opening race in France, Agostini had a 350 cc Yamaha hastily brought from Amsterdam. The MV had failed the new noise limit of dB(A) (the MV was measured at 132 dB(A)). The FIM admitted, however, that this new rule had been announced too late, giving the MV Agusta a little respite. The machine almost never reached the finish. In France a stone hit the distributor cap, in Austria the clutch slipped, in Italy, Yugoslavia, Czechoslovakia and Germany, Ago stopped for unknown reasons and in Finland the ignition broke down. The organisation had even done everything there to get the MV Agusta through the noise inspection. A false statement of the team's bore / stroke ratio was then accepted, while it was still fairly well-known: 54 x 38 mm. As a result, the measurement was carried out at a specific corrected piston speed at 7,000 rpm, while that should have been 10,000 rpm. The measurement was 113 dB(A) and MV Agusta claimed a power loss of 3 hp. The only time the MV scored points that season was Agostini's win in Assen. At the end of the season, MV Agusta announced it would stop road racing.

== Prototypes ==
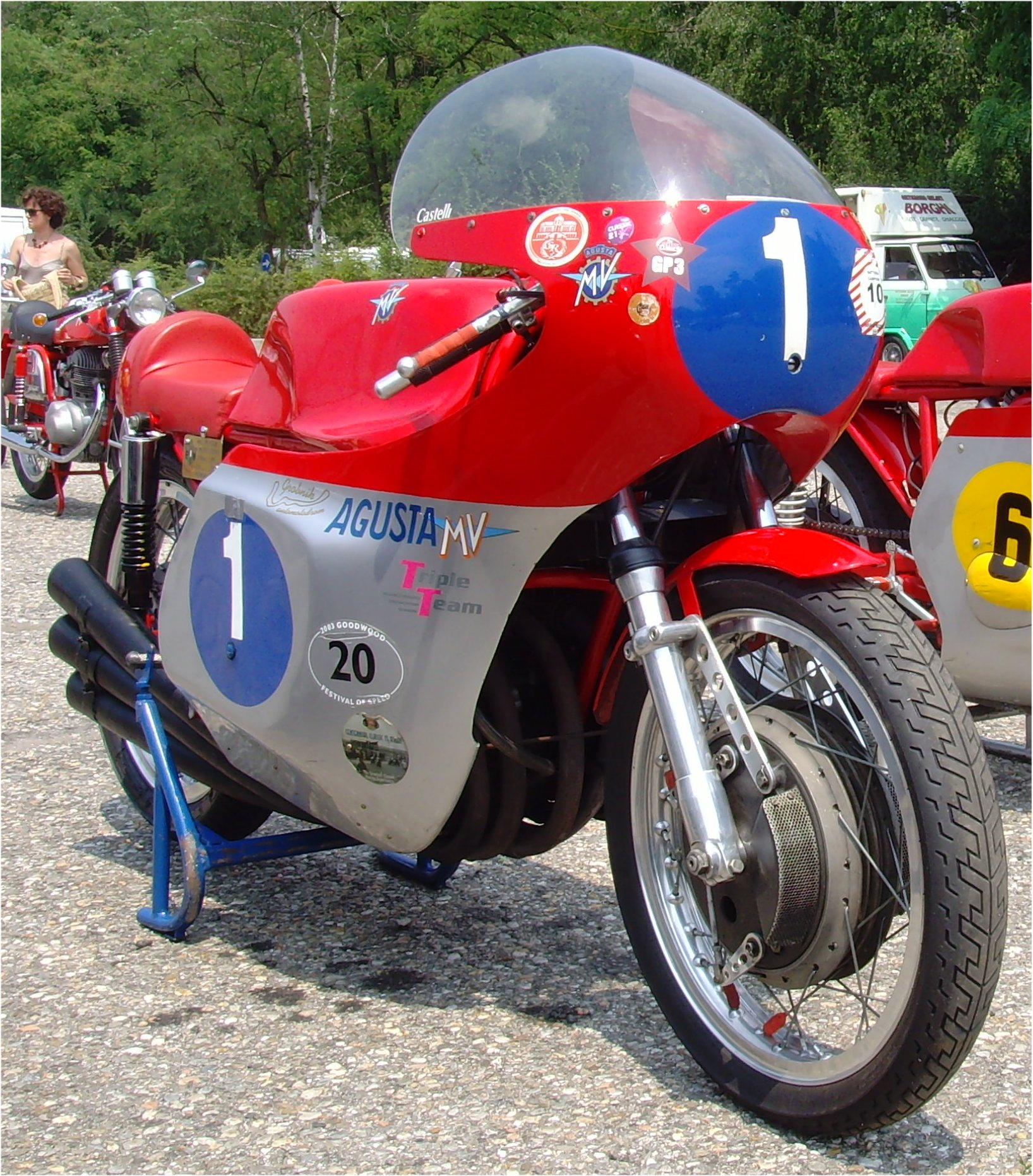
MV Agusta 350 6C GP, 1969

In 1957, MV Agusta developed two prototypes for the 350 cc class, a six-cylinder and a two-cylinder. Nello Pagani rode the six-cylinder unsuccessfully in the last race of 1957, the GP des Nations at Monza. The two-cylinder was never raced.

=== MV Agusta 350 6C 1957 ===
The six-cylinder in- line engine was a logical development because MV Agusta built a 500 cc version in response to the Moto Guzzi Otto Cilindri. The machine provided enough power, but this did not outweigh the extra weight. The machine had a six-cylinder in-line engine with only two valves per cylinder. The air-cooled six-cylinder engine still had double overhead camshafts and a double cradle frame, the lower tubes of which could be detached for easy removal of the engine block.

=== MV Agusta 350 2C 1957 ===
A completely different techniques were used with the 350 cc two-cylinder, especially with regard to the frame. This machine had a trellis frame that consisted of triangular constructions of thin tubes, and where the engine was a structural part. The cylinders leaned sharply forward and the machine used the old-fashioned Earles front fork again, probably because using the same thin tubes it was lighter than a telescopic fork. By applying two external flywheels, the engine block could be made compact and strong. The engine also had a dry-sump system and delivered around 47 hp at 12,000 rpm.

=== MV Agusta 350 6C 1968 ===
In 1968 they wanted to continue developing the six-cylinder engine, but the FIM ruled that from now on the 350 and 500 cc racers should not have more than four cylinders. A prototype was built, this time with four valves per cylinder, but that could not be used in the world championship. Sometimes the drivers did practice on it: in 1971 both Giacomo Agostini and Angelo Bergamonti did that in the spring race in Modena.

=== Technical data MV Agusta prototypes ===
| MV Agusta | 350 2C | 350 6C | 350 6C |
|---|---|---|---|
| Year | 1957 | | 1968 |
| Valvetrain | DOHC with two valves per cylinder | | DOHC with four valves per cylinder |
| Engine configuration | Four-stroke transverse Straight-twin engine | Four-stroke transverse Straight-six engine | |
| Engine cooling | Air cooling | | |
| Bore | 62 mm | 44 mm | 46 mm |
| Stroke | 58 mm | 38,25 mm | 35 mm |
| Engine displacement | 350 cc | 349 cc | 349 cc |
| Lubrication system | Dry sump | Wet sump | |
| Carburetors | 2 x Dell'Orto 29 mm | 6 x Dell'Orto 24 mm | 6 Dell'Orto 16 mm |
| Max power | 47 bhp (35 kW) @ 12.000 rpm | 70 bhp (52 kW) @ 16.000 rpm | 75 bhp (56 kW) @ 16.000 rpm |
| Primary drive | Gear | | |
| Clutch | Wet multi-plate | | |
| Gears | 5 | 7 | 6 |
| Final drive | Chain drive | | |
| Frame | Trellis | Double cradle | |
| Front forks | Earles forks | Telescopic forks | |
| Rear forks | Swingarm | | |
| Brakes | Drum brakes | | |

== Bibliography ==
- Büla, Maurice; Schertenleib, Jean-Claude (2001). Continental Circus 1949-2000 (in French). Chronosports. ISBN 9782940125760.
- Burgers, Jan; Burgers, Hetty; Weeink, Frank (2002). Continental circus : the races and the places, the people and the faces : pictures and stories from the early seventies (2nd ed.). Mastix Press. ISBN 978-90-818639-5-7.
- Cook, R.A.B., ed. (1956). Motor Cycling Sports Yearbook 1956. Temple Press Ltd.
- Noyes, Dennis; Scott, Michael (1999). Motocourse: 50 Years Of Moto Grand Prix. Hazleton Publishing Ltd. ISBN 1-874557-83-7.
