= Yamaha RA97 =

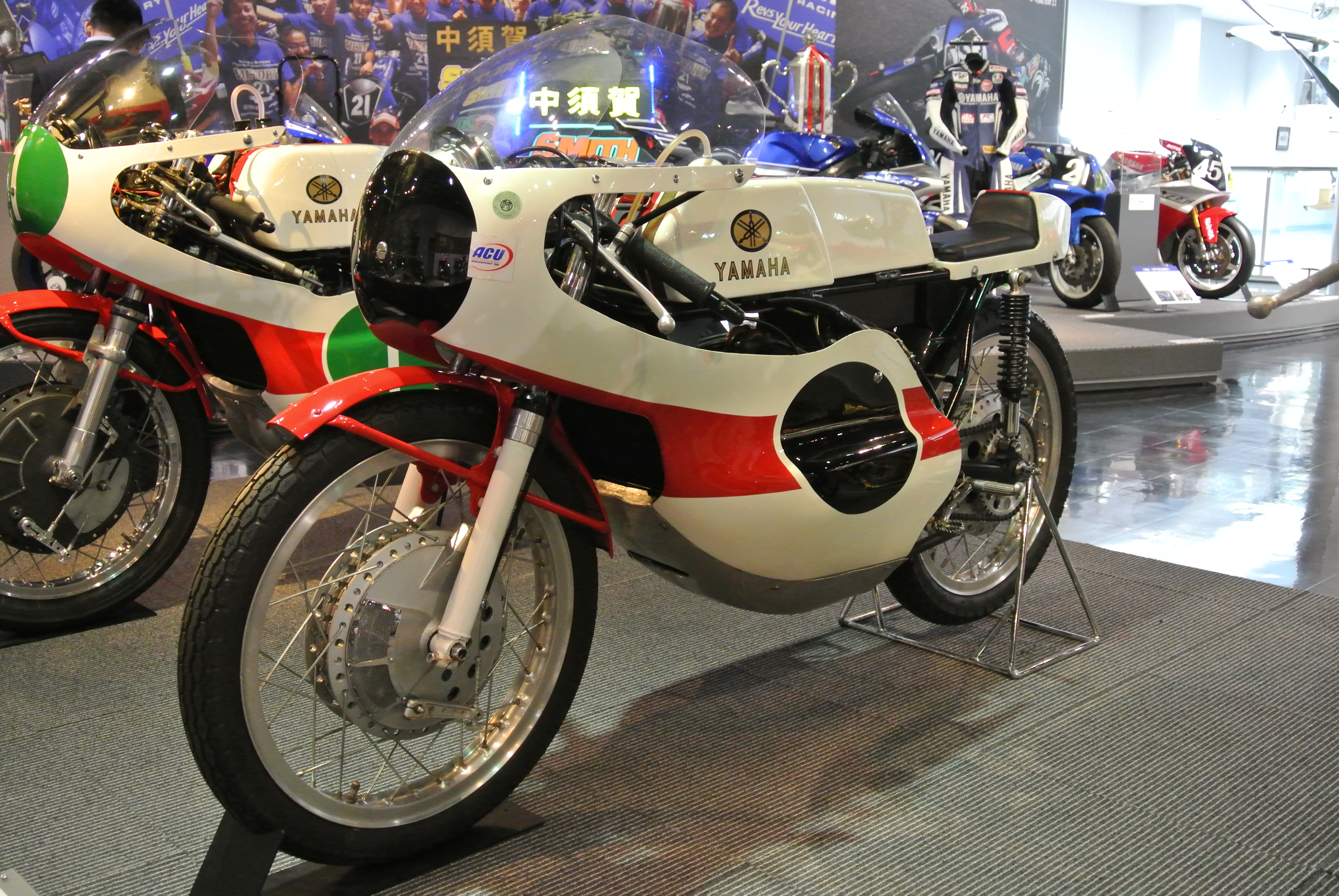
- Manufacturer: Yamaha
- Production: 1966
- Class: 125cc
- Engine: 124.7 cc (7.61 cu in), twin-cylinder, 2-stroke
- Bore / stroke: 44 mm × 41 mm (1.7 in × 1.6 in)
- Power: 34 bhp (25 kW) @ 13,500 rpm 38 bhp (28 kW) @ 14,000 rpm
- Transmission: 9-speed
- Suspension: Telescopic hydraulic fork (front) dual-shock absorbers with adjustable preload (rear)
- Brakes: Drum brakes

The Yamaha RA97 is a racing motorcycle produced by Yamaha, for the 125cc class of Grand Prix motorcycle racing, in 1966.

== RA 97 ==
In 1964, a new model was presented, the RA97, equipped with a twin-cylinder engine which in the first version maintained air cooling, replaced by liquid cooling starting in 1965.

This latest version was initially credited with 34 horsepower, which rose to 38 in the latest evolution in 1966; the rotation speed had also undergone an elevation to 13,500/14,000 rpm.

Compared to the previous single-cylinder versions, this model began to obtain good results also in world competitions: in the 1964 season with Phil Read as top driver, it managed to get a second place in the Dutch GP still in its air-cooled version before its evolution was brought to its debut in the Japanese motorcycle Grand Prix.

In the 1965 world championship, again driven by Phil Read, it won the Tourist Trophy, and the other official riders, Mike Duff and Bill Ivy obtained good results, with the former winning the Dutch GP and finishing in 6th place in the world championship standings.

In 1966, the last year of racing before the definitive replacement with the new model, the bike was equipped with a 9-speed gearbox and obtained various victories (4 with Ivy and 1 with Read) with Ivy finishing second in the general classification, preceded only by Luigi Taveri with a Honda.
