= Yamaha TZ125 =

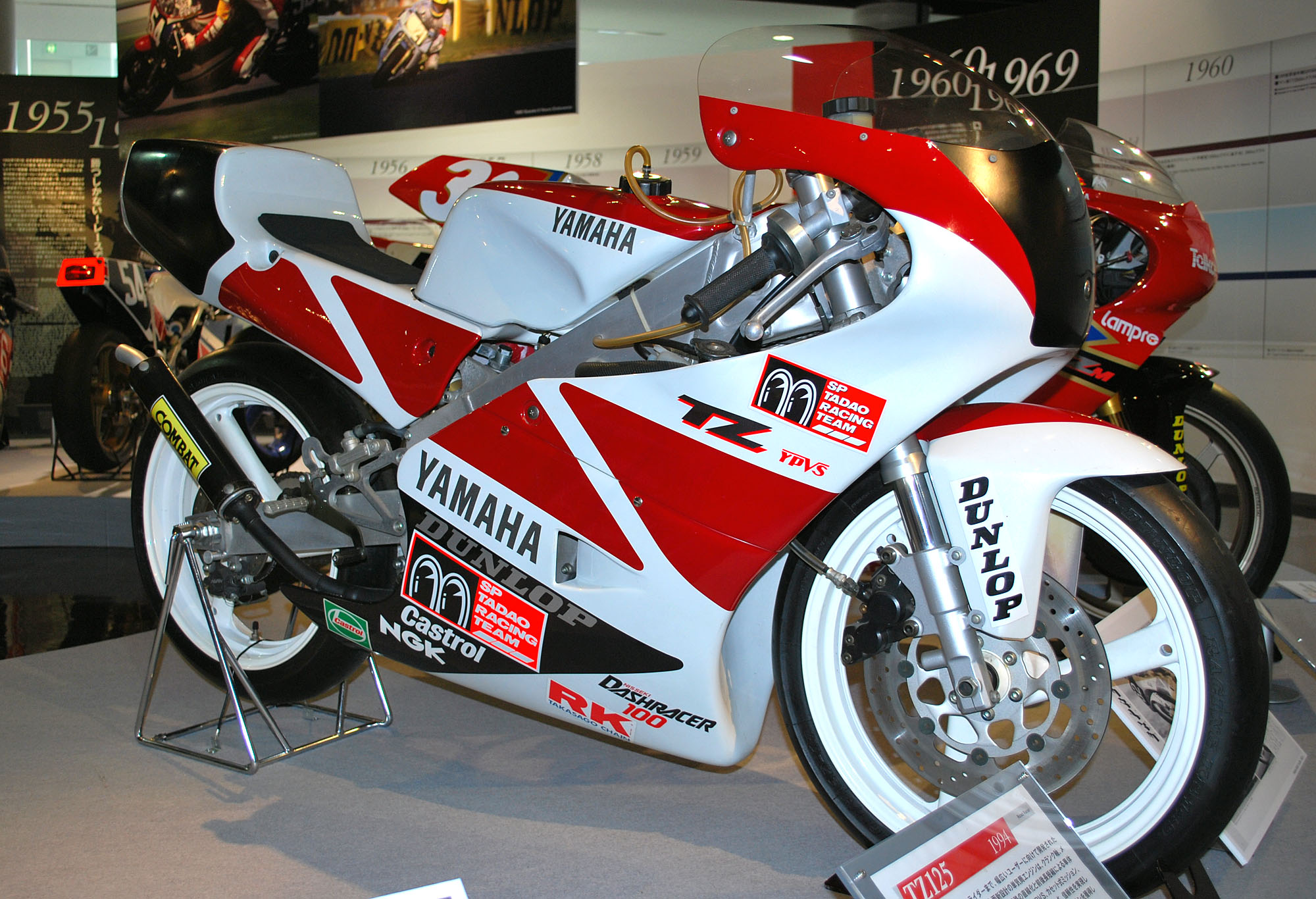
- Manufacturer: Yamaha
- Production: 1980-2010
- Class: Grand Prix motorcycle racing
- Engine: 125 cc, 1-cylinder, 2-stroke
- Power: 44 bhp (33 kW) @ 12,250 rpm
- Transmission: 6-speed
- Tires: 18"
- Dimensions: L: 1,790 mm (70 in); W: 520 mm (20 in)
- Weight: 72 kg (dry)
- Related: Yamaha TZ750; Yamaha TZ350; Yamaha TZ250

The Yamaha TZ125 was a racing motorcycle produced by the Yamaha Motor Company from 1980 to 2010. The motorcycle was powered by a two stroke 125 cc engine.

The first water cooled two stroke 125cc roadracer from Yamaha was released late in 1979 in the shape of the TZ125G.

Japanese rider Yoshiaki Katoh became All Japan Road Race champion in 1993 on a Yamaha TZ125.
