= MV Agusta 125 Motore Lungo =

Italian motorcycle

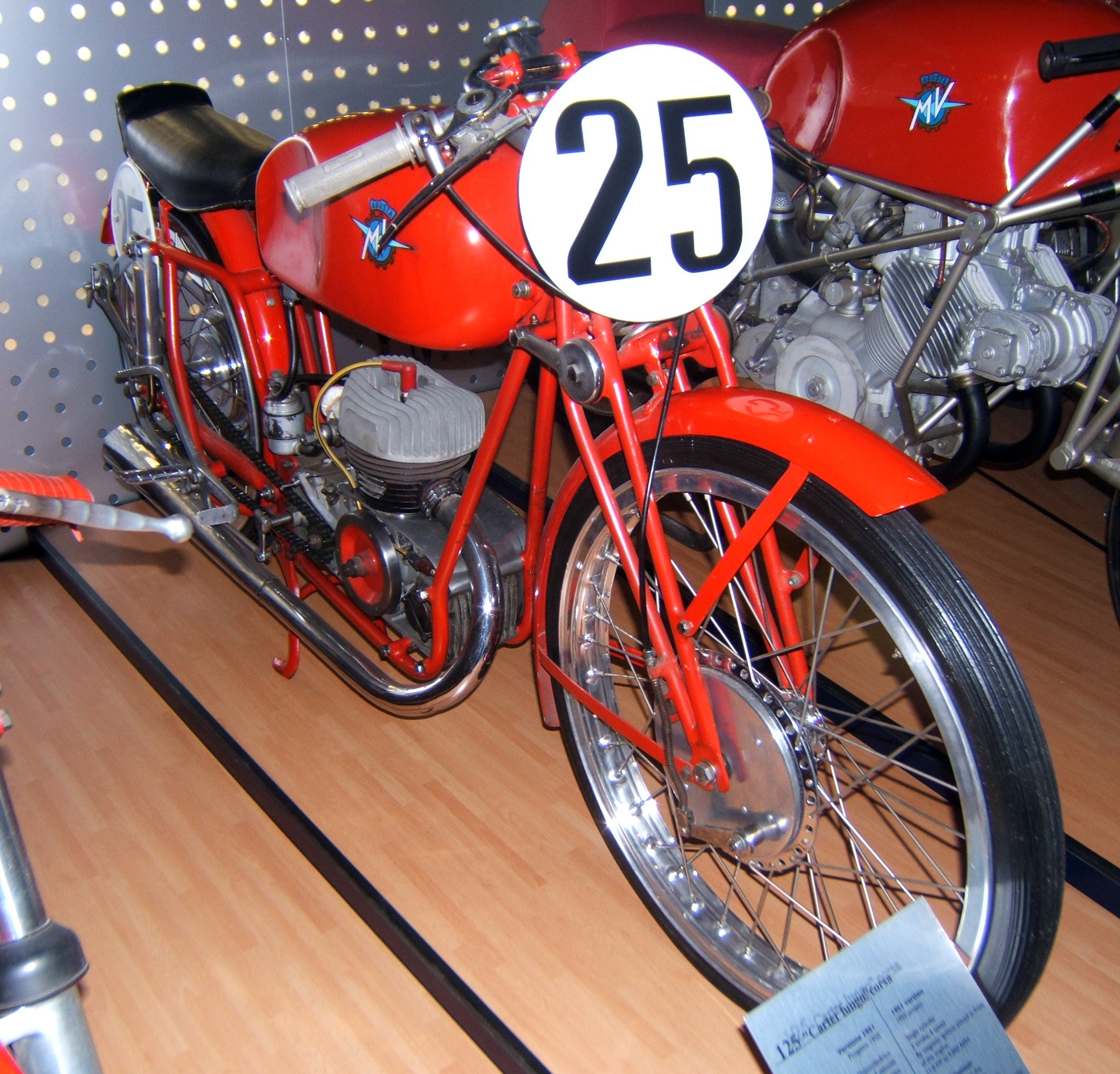
- MV Agusta 125 Motore Lungo "competizione", MV Agusta Museum of Cascina Costa
- Manufacturer: MV Agusta
- Production: 1950–1953
- Predecessor: MV Agusta 125 "4 velocita"
- Class: Sport bike
- Engine: 123.5 cc Two-stroke
- Bore / stroke: 53 × 56 mm
- Compression ratio: 9:1
- Top speed: 120 km/h
- Power: 12 bhp @ 9000 rpm
- Ignition type: Magneto
- Transmission: Wet multi-plate clutch, 4 gears, chain drive
- Frame type: Double cradle frame
- Suspension: Front: Girder forks Rear: Swinging arm with friction dampers
- Brakes: Drum brakes: 190mm front, 160 mm rear
- Tires: 2,75 x 19 front & rear
- Wheelbase: 1300 mm
- Weight: 95 kg (dry)
- Fuel capacity: 14 l

The MV Agusta 125 Motore Lungo (long engine), more commonly known as the "carter lungo" (long crankcase), was a 125 cc, lightweight two-stroke motorcycle manufactured between 1950 and 1953 by Italian motorcycle manufacturer MV Agusta. The machine was often used in racing.

== History ==
MV Augusta started making lightweight motorcycles in 1946. In 1948, a 125 cc class was added to the Italian national motorcycle racing championship (Campionato Italiano di Velocità). MV produced a 3 speed two-stroke machine to compete in this class, the 125 "Valenza". This was superseded in 1949 by the 125 "4 velocita" (4 speed). For 1950, the improved 125 "Motore Lungo" was introduced, which produced 12 bhp @ 9000 rpm.

== Details ==
The term "long engine" derives from the elongated crankcase in front of the cylinder, which housed a special Magneti Marelli magneto. The previous model, the 125 "4 velocita", was retrospectively known as the "short crankcase" to differentiate it from the "long crankcase".

The engine was an air-cooled single-cylinder two-stroke with a bore and stroke of 53 × 56 mm giving a displacement 123.5 cc. The compression ratio was 9:1, and the engine was fed by a Dell'Orto SS 25 A carburetor.

A Wet multi-plate clutch was driven by gears from the crankshaft, and a four-speed gearbox sent drive to the rear wheel by chain.

The MV Agusta had a double cradle frame and girder forks. At the rear there was a swinging arm with friction dampers. Drum brakes were fitted front and back, 190 mm diameter at the front and 160 mm at the rear.

Two versions of the bike were made: the road version, complete with lights, and the sports version, called the "competizione" (competition) model.

== Racing ==
The machine was especially popular in the national 125 cc racing class, where its characteristics of competitiveness and low price appealed to the needs of those who were beginning their career as a rider, and it became the most popular sports bike of the time.
