= Suzuki 50 GP racers =

Suzuki 125 GP racers
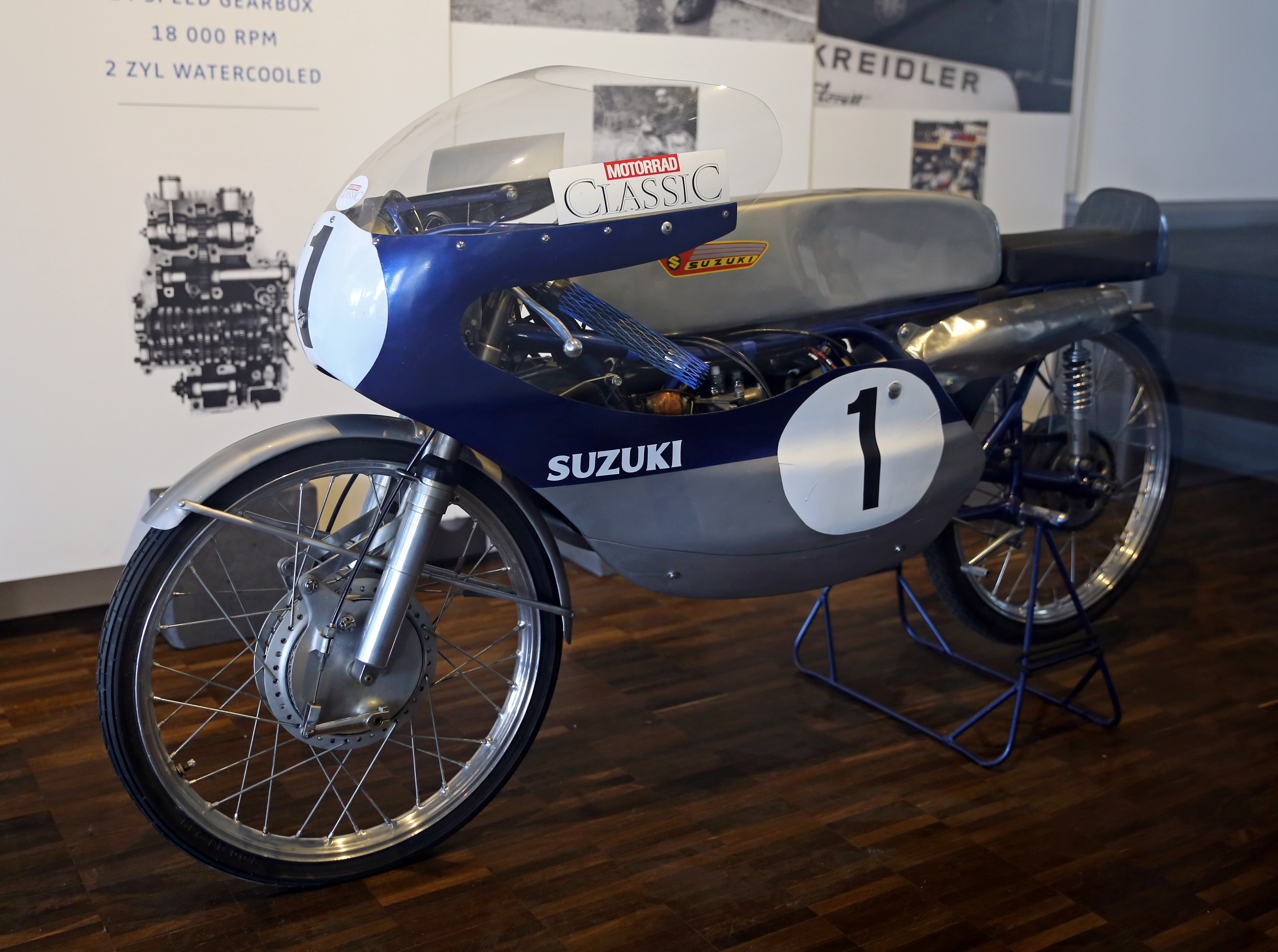
- Manufacturer: Suzuki
- Production: 1962-1968
- Class: 50 cc
- Engine: 2-stroke, air-cooled/liquid-cooled, single-cylinder/parallel-twin/inline-triple
- Top speed: 145–176 km/h (90–109 mph)
- Power: 17.5 hp (13 kW) @ 17,300 rpm to 19 hp (14 kW) @ 20,000 rpm
- Transmission: 8/9/14-speed, chain final drive
- Suspension: Telescopic forks (front); swing arm with twin spring/shock absorbers (rear)
- Brakes: Twin leading-shoe drum (front & rear)
- Tires: 2.50-18 / 2.50-18

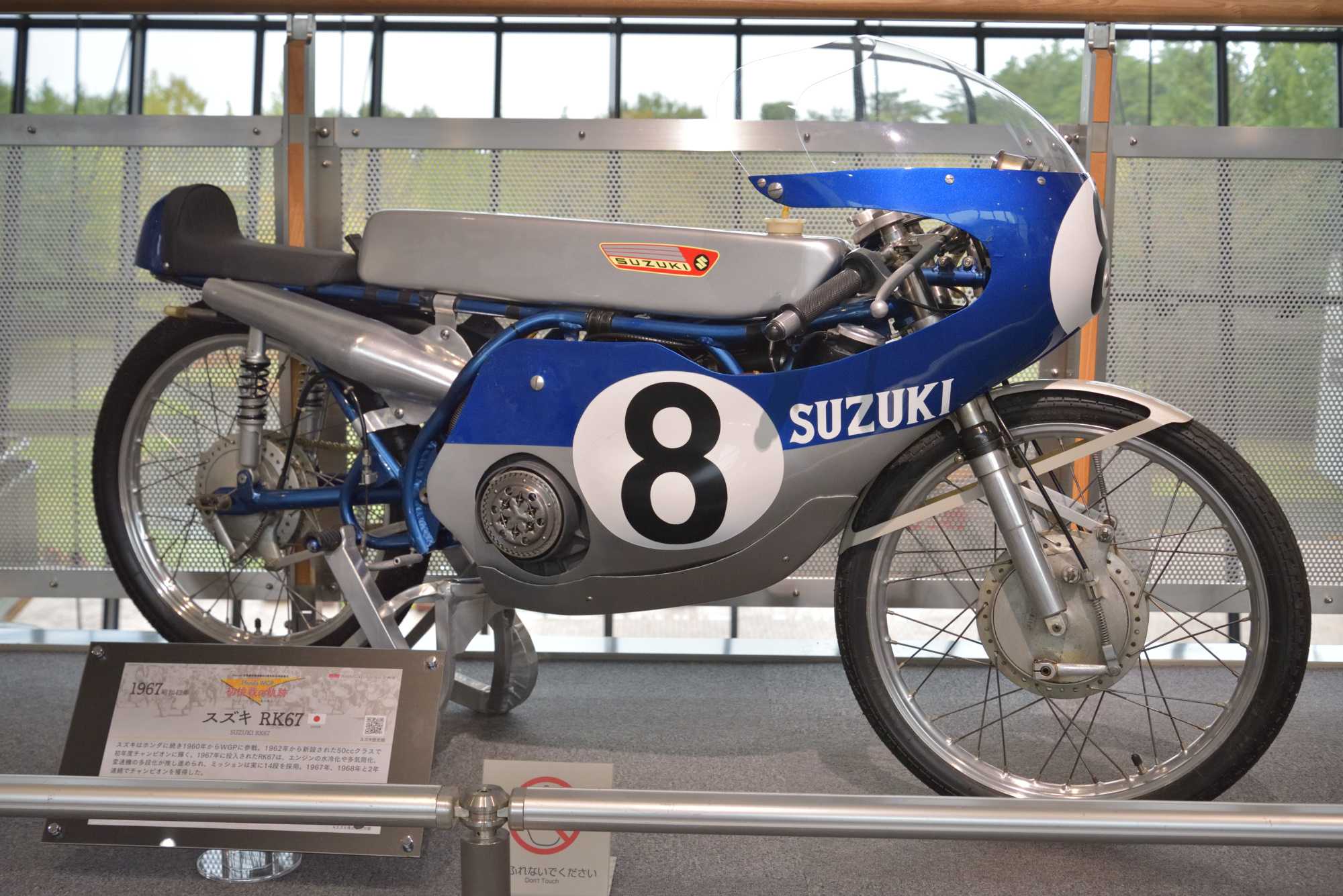
#8 1967 RK67 on display.

The Suzuki 50 GP racers were a series of 50cc racing motorcycles designed, developed, and built by Suzuki, to compete in the Grand Prix motorcycle racing world championship, between 1962 and 1968.
