= Yamaha TZ250 =

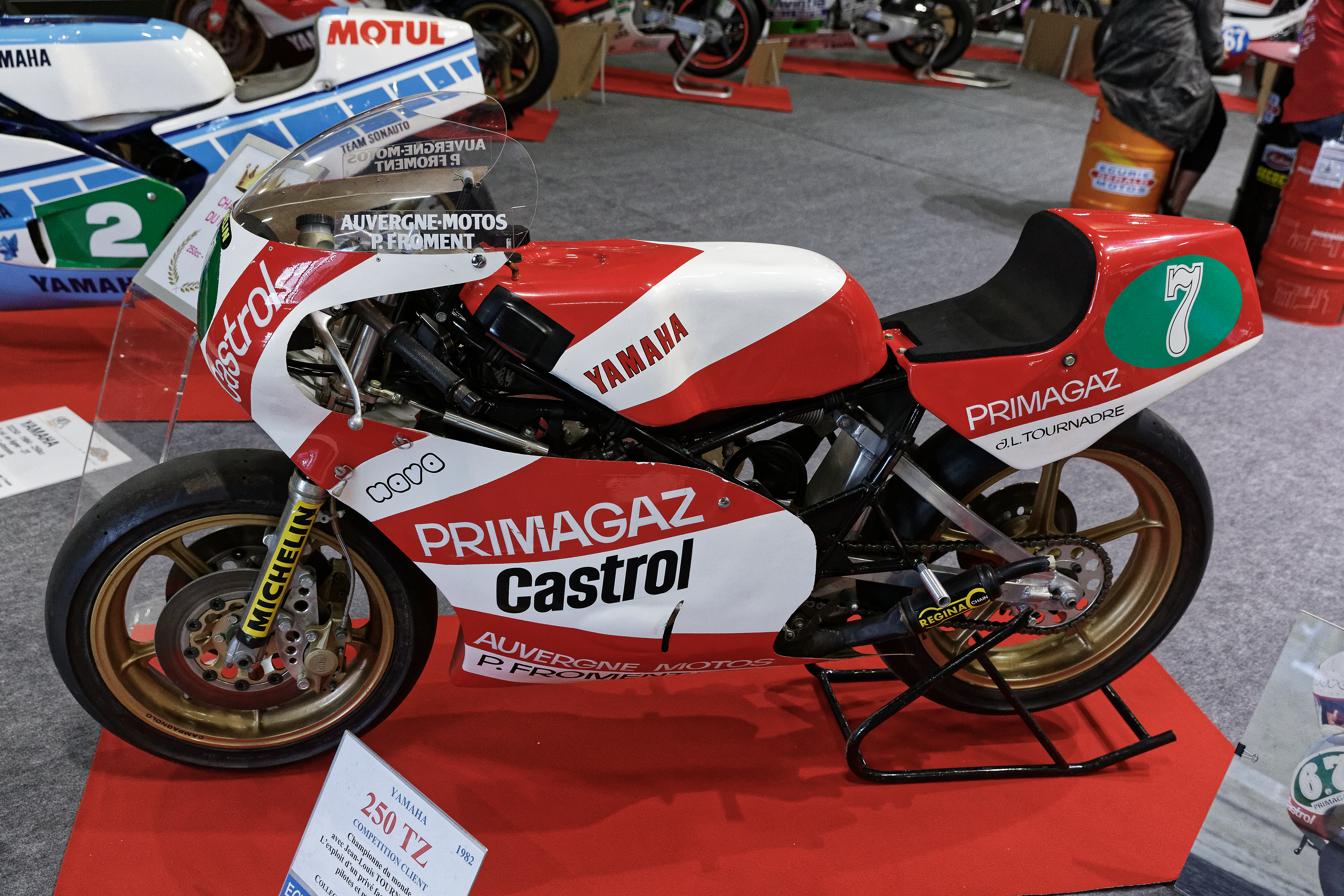
- Manufacturer: Yamaha
- Production: 1973–2004
- Class: Grand Prix motorcycle racing
- Engine: 247–249 cc (15.1–15.2 cu in), 2-cylinder, 2-stroke
- Bore / stroke: 56 mm × 50.7 mm (2.20 in × 2.00 in)
- Top speed: over 240 km/h (150 mph)
- Power: 51 bhp (38 kW) @ 10,500 rpm to 76 bhp (57 kW) @ 11,750 rpm
- Torque: 47.1 N⋅m (34.7 lb⋅ft) @ 11,500 rpm
- Transmission: 6-speed
- Brakes: Front: Dual 280 mm (11 in) discs Rear: Single 210 mm (8.3 in) disc
- Tires: Front: 3.25/4.75 R17; Rear: 3.80/6.00 R17
- Wheelbase: 1,312–1,328 mm (51.7–52.3 in)
- Dimensions: L: 1,920 mm (76 in); W: 650 mm (26 in); H: 1,085 mm (42.7 in)
- Weight: 98–108 kg (216–238 lb) (dry)
- Fuel capacity: 23.5 L (5.2 imp gal; 6.2 US gal)
- Related: Yamaha TZ750; Yamaha TZ350; Yamaha TZ125

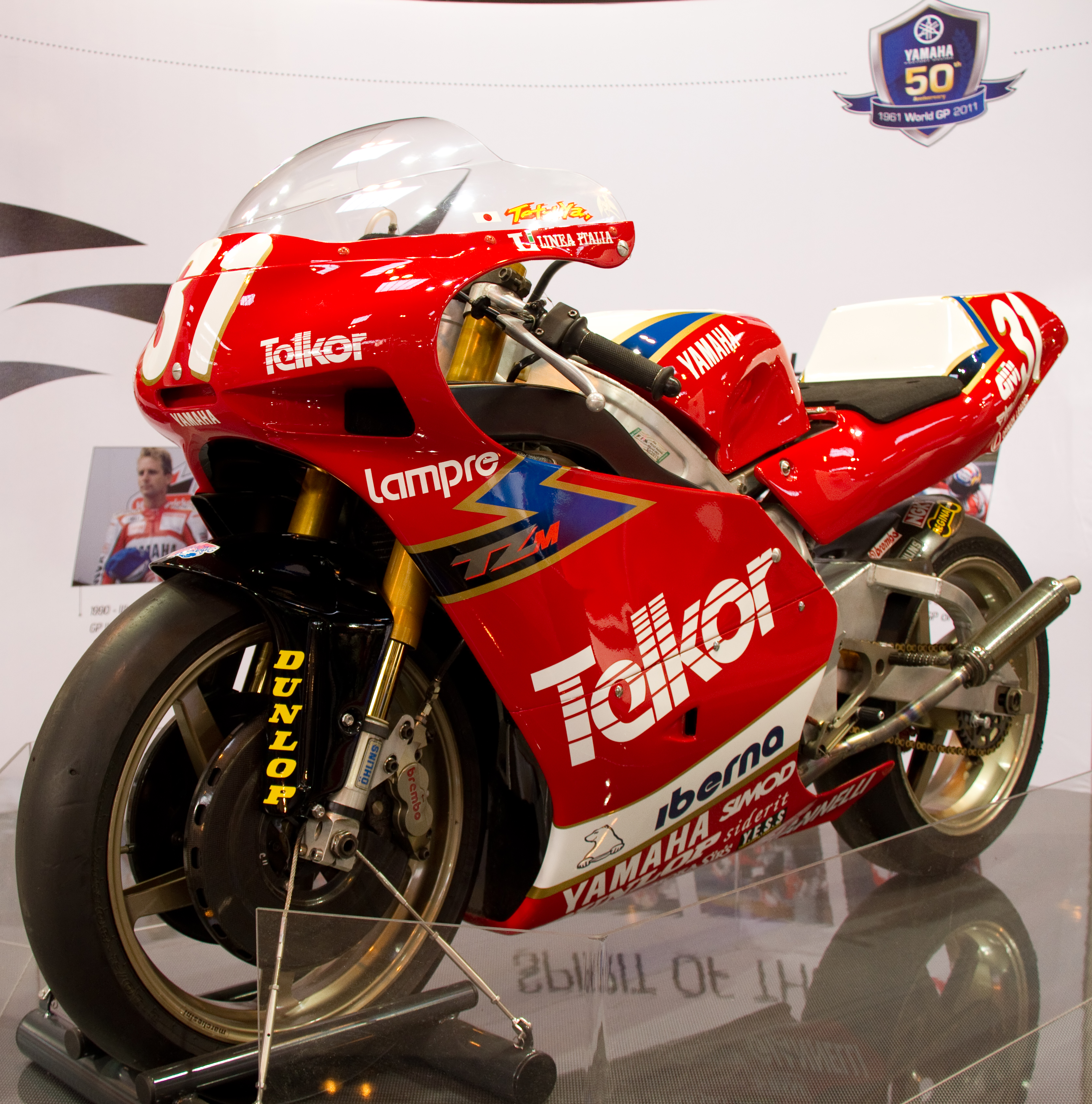
1993 version of the TZ250M

The Yamaha TZ250 was a commercially available racing motorcycle with a watercooled, two-stroke, 250 cc engine produced by the Japanese manufacturer Yamaha.

The basis of the production-volume racer was the OW17 factory machine from Yamaha, which was used in the motorcycle world championship from 1973 to 1990, and with which Dieter Braun became motorcycle world champion in the 250cc class in 1973. The almost identical Yamaha TZ 350 was manufactured with a larger bore (64 instead of 54 mm).

== Background and technology ==
The water-cooled TZ series of production-volume racing machines in the up to 250 cm^{3} class was unveiled in June 1973 and replaced the air-cooled variants of the TD1 and TD2 series. The bore-stroke ratio of 54 × 54 mm was adopted from the TD 3, which appeared in 1972. With the model year 1981 (TZ 250 H) a completely new design was brought onto the market. Instead of a modified standard housing, a sand-cast housing specially developed for racing was used; the two cylinders were no longer cast in a block, but standing individually. The bore/stroke ratio changed to 56 mm × 50.7 mm (2.20 in × 2.00 in). In addition, the cylinders received a so-called Yamaha Power Valve System (YPVS). The first model series (TZ 250 A) of the water-cooled twin with contactless thyristor magneto ignition had a power output of 51 HP, the last expansion stage, the TZ 250 A (3TC) from 1990, 76 HP.

While the diaphragm control was taken over into series production, Yamaha decided to use the piston edge control for the Production Racer up to model year 1984 (TZ 250 L). With the TZ 250 N model, the inlet diaphragm was also controlled in the TZ engine. The fresh oil system provided by Yamaha was easily converted to mixed lubrication (1:20) by some private drivers.

The power was transmitted via a chain to the rear wheel via a six-speed gearbox. The chassis consisted of a double-loop tubular frame with a telescopic fork and two spring struts on the rear swing arm. At the front, a worried Duo-duplex brake on the rear wheel a duplex brake for the delay. With the model TZ 250 C (1975), the chassis was revised, and a cantilever swing arm with central spring strut and disc brakes were introduced. The petrol tank held 23 liters, the oil supply was 1.5 liters.

In 1991, the engine of the TZ 250 was thoroughly revised and adapted to the factory racing machine (YZR 250). The new model series, now with a V-engine, was delivered to selected riders until 2004.
