= Suzuki 250 GP racers =

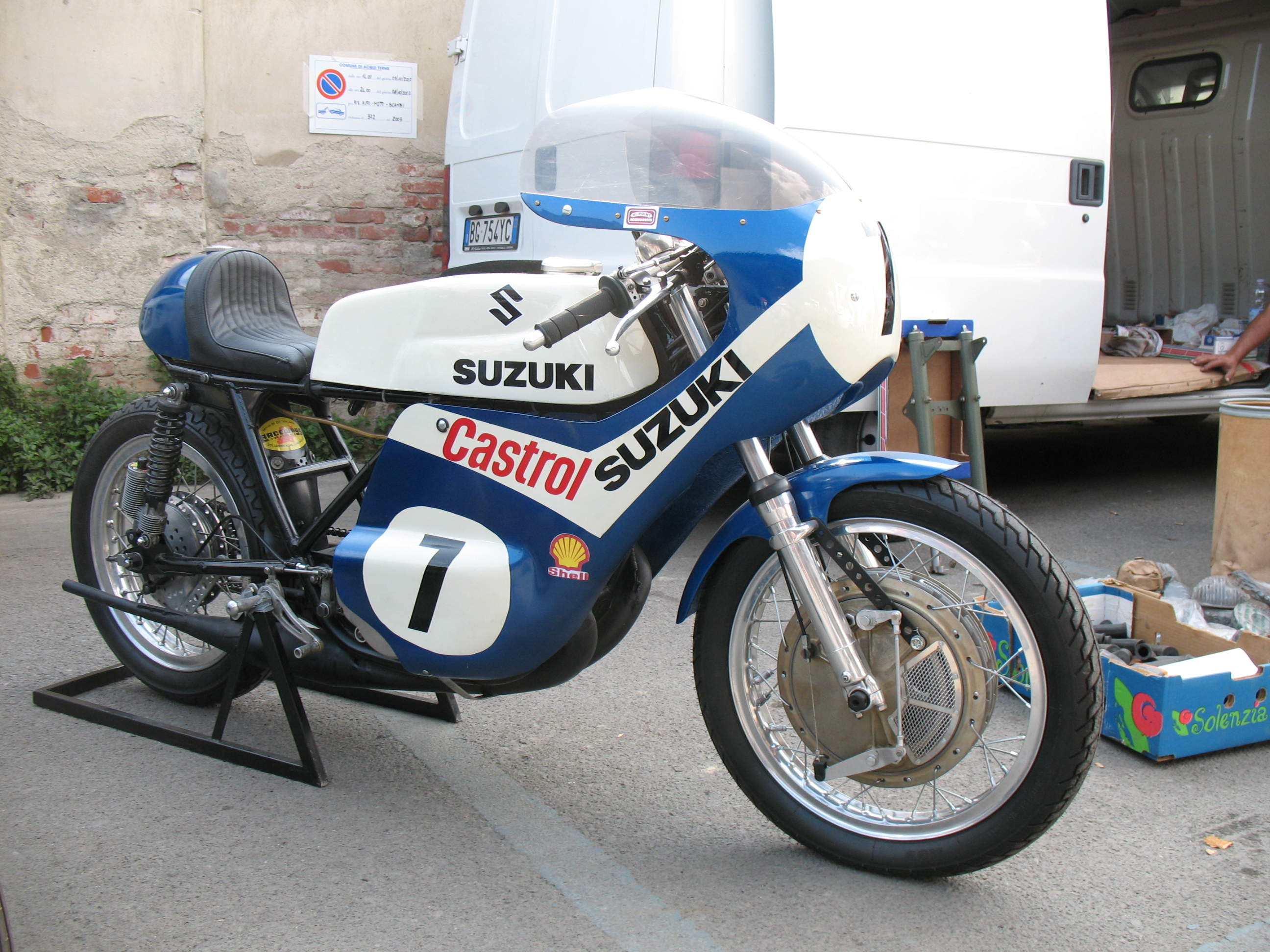
- Manufacturer: Suzuki
- Production: 1962–1970
- Class: 250 cc
- Engine: 2-stroke, liquid-cooled, single-cylinder/parallel-twin/I4
- Top speed: 190–225 km/h (118–140 mph)
- Power: 15 hp (11 kW) @ 10,000 rpm to 55 hp (41 kW) @ 12,500 rpm
- Transmission: 6-speed, chain final drive
- Suspension: Telescopic forks (front); swing arm with twin spring/shock absorbers (rear)
- Brakes: Twin leading-shoe drum (front & rear)
- Tires: 2.75-18 / 3.00-18

The Suzuki 250 GP racers were a series of 250cc racing motorcycle designed, developed and built by Suzuki, to compete in the Grand Prix motorcycle racing world championship, between 1962 and 1970.
