= Yamaha RA41 =

- Manufacturer: Yamaha
- Production: 1961
- Class: 125cc
- Engine: 124 cc, single-cylinder, 2-stroke
- Power: 20 bhp (15 kW) @ 10,000 rpm
- Transmission: 6-speed
- Suspension: Telescopic hydraulic fork (front) dual-shock absorbers with adjustable preload (rear)
- Brakes: Drum brakes

The Yamaha RA41 is a racing motorcycle produced by Yamaha, for the 125cc class of Grand Prix motorcycle racing, in 1961.
