= MV Agusta 125 SOHC =

MV Agusta 125 Sohc
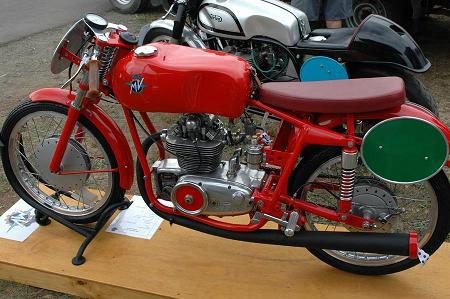
- Manufacturer: MV Agusta
- Also called: MV Agusta 125 Monoalbero
- Production: 1953–1956
- Class: 126
- Engine: Four stroke, single cylinder, single over head camshaft
- Top speed: 93 mph (150 km/h)
- Power: 16 hp (12 kW) @ 10,300 rpm
- Transmission: Unit Construction 4-speed
- Suspension: Front: Telescopic fork with central hydraulic damper Rear: Swingarm with hydraulic dampers
- Brakes: Front: Central Drum 180 mm Rear: Central Drum 150 mm
- Tires: Front: 2.00 x 19; Rear: 2.50 X 19
- Wheelbase: 1250 mm
- Weight: 75 kg (165 lb) (dry)
- Fuel capacity: 14 L (3.7 US gal)

The MV Agusta 125 SOHC, also called the MV Agusta 125 Monoalbero was a motorcycle produced by MV Agusta as a "Catalog" racer for the public in 1953. Privateer racers could purchase this race bike and be competitive with a machine that was very similar to MV Agusta's motorcycles built for racing. The motorcycle remained in production until 1956.

== Specifications ==
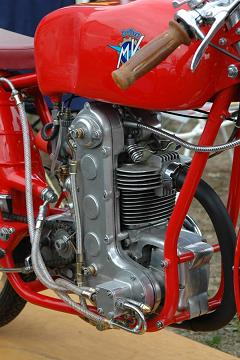
125cc Sohc engine

- Bore Stroke: (4-stroke Single cylinder 53 X 56 - 123.5 cm)
- Compression Ratio: 9.2 : 1
- Ignition: Magnito
- Clutch: Wet, Multi plate
- Carburetors: Dell’ Orto SS 27A
- Wheels: Light Alloy, Wire spoke. Front: 1.75 X 19” Rear: 2.25 X 19”
- Oil Tank capacity: 2 kg.
- Transmission: Geared Primary, Final Drive. Chain
- Valve Configuration: Inclined overhead
- Lubrication: Geared Pressure pump

== Fairing ==
In 1953 many racers adopted the dustbin fairing design on the MV Agusta 125 Bialbero. The dustbin was a very large fairing that was built with air flow in mind. In 1957, the dustbin fairing was banned due to riders being injured when strong crosswinds blew the racers off the track.

== See also ==
- List of motorcycles of the 1950s
