= Yamaha 125 V4 =

Yamaha 125 V4 (RA31A)
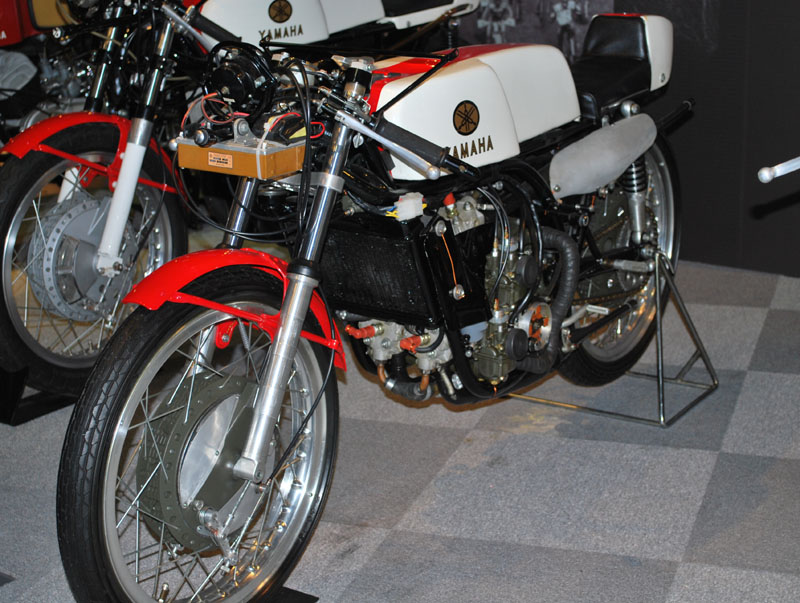
- Manufacturer: Yamaha
- Production: 1966–1970
- Class: 125cc
- Engine: 124.7 cc (7.61 cu in), 60° V4, 2-stroke
- Bore / stroke: 35 mm × 32.4 mm (1.38 in × 1.28 in)
- Power: 44 bhp (33 kW) @ 17,000 rpm
- Transmission: 8/9-speed
- Suspension: Telescopic fork suspension
- Brakes: Drum brakes

The Yamaha 125 V4, also known as the RA31A, is a racing motorcycle produced by Yamaha, for the 125cc class of Grand Prix motorcycle racing, between 1966 and 1970.

== RA31A ==
Already previewed in the competitions of the second half of 1966, in 1967 the last of the "RA" series was officially launched, the RA31, with a four-cylinder V engine with two crankshafts, connected to each other by means of a gear. where the cylinders are liquid-cooled and with a useful arc of use of the engine ranging from 15,000 to 17,000 rpm.

It will be with this model, used in the 1967 and 1968 world championships, that Yamaha will get its first world titles in the 125 class, the first year with Bill Ivy and the second (with the 31A version) with Phil Read.
