= Kawasaki KR250 and KR350 =

Kawasaki KR250
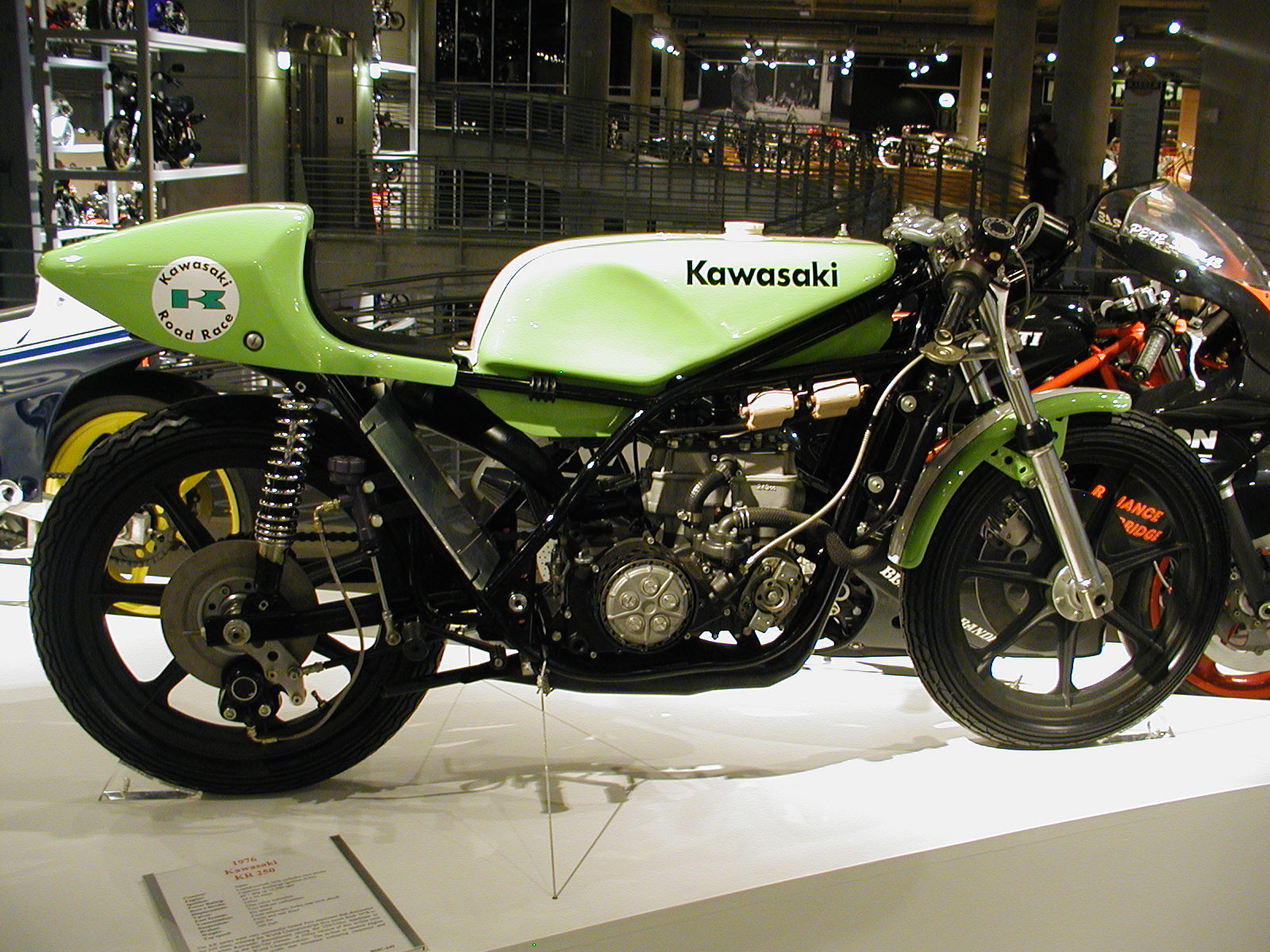
- 1976 KR250 at the Barber Vintage Motorsports Museum
- Manufacturer: Kawasaki
- Production: 1975-1982
- Class: Racing (250 cc class)
- Engine: 247.3 cc (15.09 cu in) Tandem twin cylinder liquid cooled two stroke
- Bore / stroke: 54 mm × 54 mm (2.1 in × 2.1 in)
- Power: 56 hp (42 kW)@ 10,000 rpm
- Transmission: 6-Speed
- Related: Kawasaki KR500

The Kawasaki KR250 was a racing motorcycle built by Kawasaki from 1975 to 1982 for the 250 cc class of Grand Prix motorcycle racing. It was powered by a two-stroke "tandem twin" engine The motorcycle won four world championships, in 1978 and 1979 with Kork Ballington and in 1980 and 1981 with Anton Mang.

Kawasaki first started to develop the motorcycles in 1974, under the direction of Nagato Sato, and chose the layout in order to minimise the frontal area of the machine and allow a disc valve engine design. In its first years, it was ridden by Mick Grant and gained little success but in 1977 it won the Dutch TT at the Assen racing circuit.

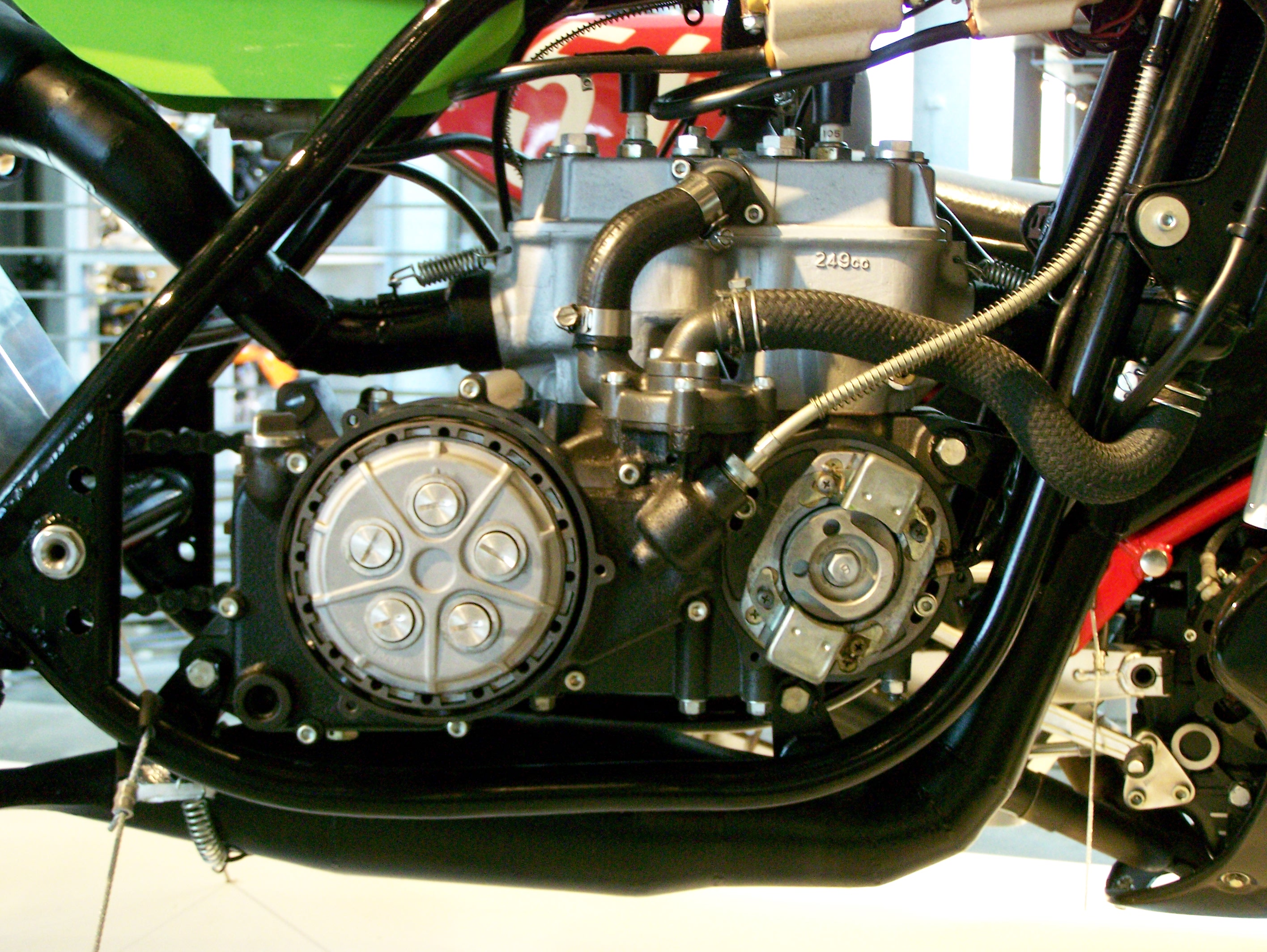
Kawasaki KR250 1976 Tandem twin cylinder

The engine design was also used for a road going motorcycle inspired by the racer.

== Kawasaki KR350 ==
Kawasaki KR350
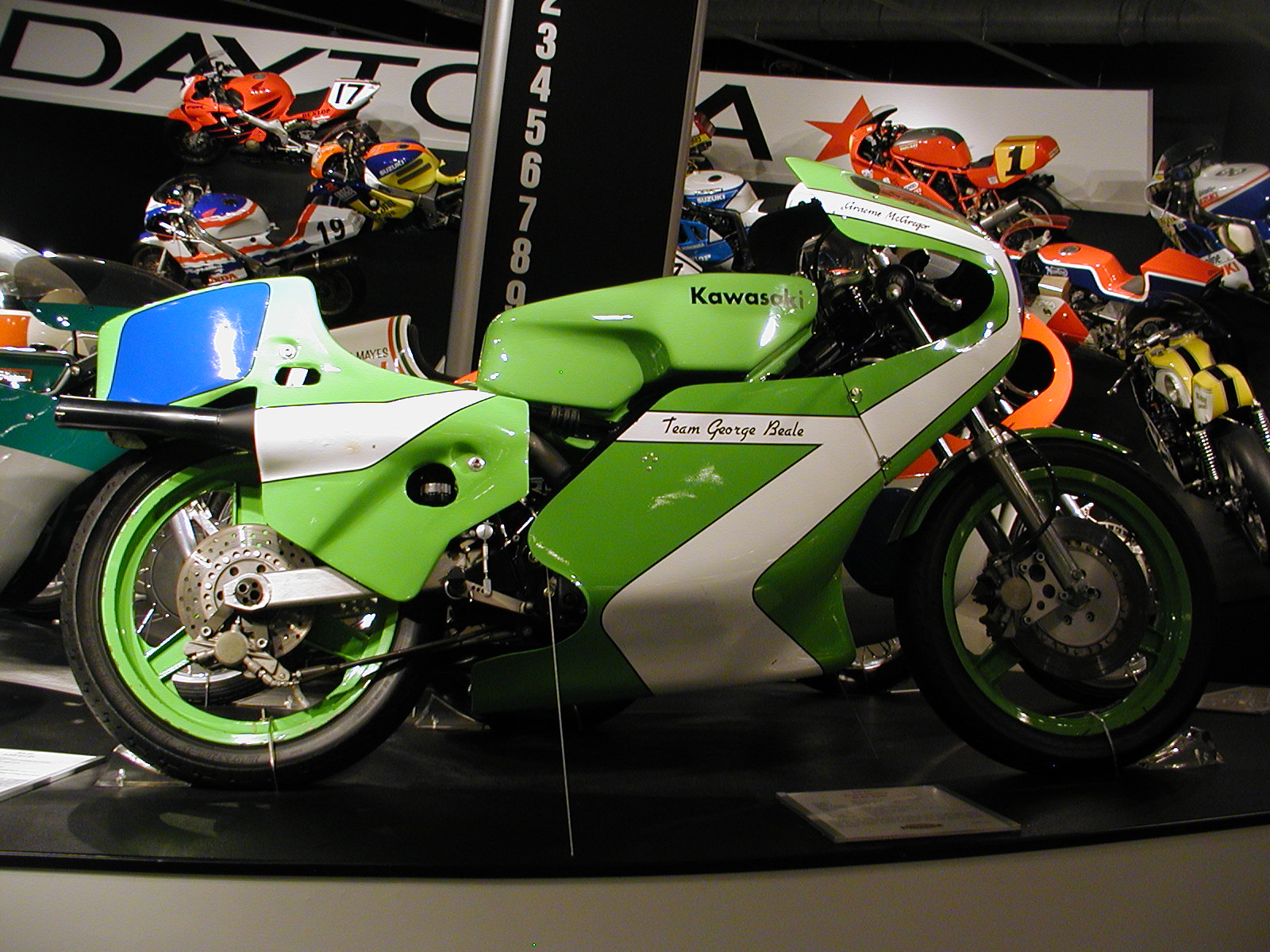
- Kawasaki KR350 1975
- Production: 1978-1982
- Class: Racing (350 cc class)
- Engine: 347.4 cc (21.20 cu in) Tandem twin cylinder liquid cooled two stroke
- Bore / stroke: 64 mm × 54 mm (2.5 in × 2.1 in)
- Power: 65 hp (48 kW)@ 11,500 rpm
- Transmission: 6 gears
- Weight: 104 kg (dry)

The KR350 was built by Kawasaki from 1978 to 1982 for the 350 cc class of Grand Prix motorcycle racing. The motorcycle was very similar to the smaller KR250. It won four world championships, in 1978 and 1979 with Kork Ballington and in 1981 and 1982 with Anton Mang.

== In popular culture ==
The KR250 (road version) was featured in Dragon Ball.

== See also ==
- Kawasaki KR-1/KR-1S
