= Moto Guzzi V8 =

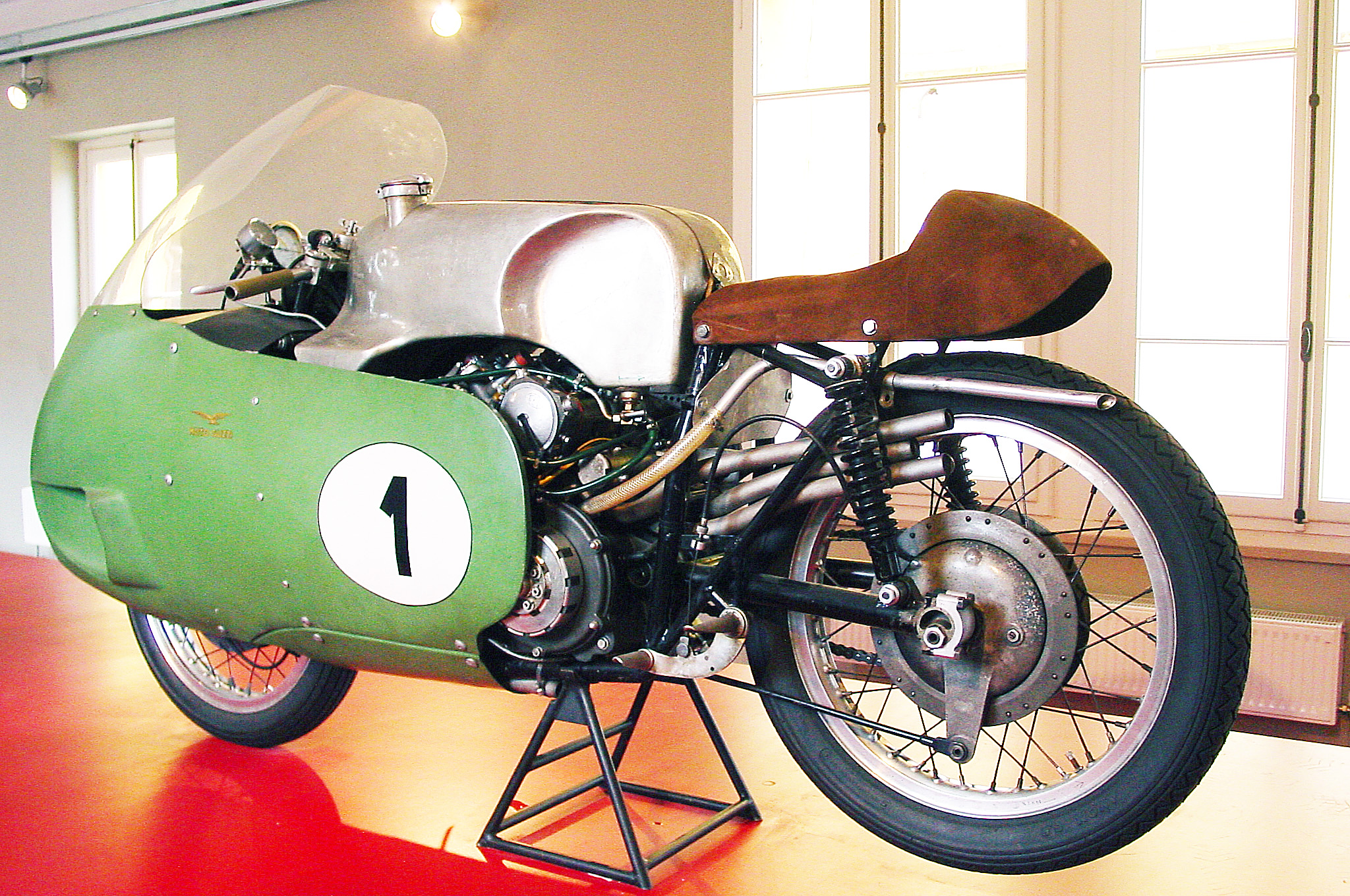
- Manufacturer: Moto Guzzi
- Also called: Otto Cilindri, the Otto
- Production: 1955–1957
- Class: Grand Prix racing motorcycle
- Engine: 499 cc (30.5 cu in) 4-stroke 90° V8 liquid cooled, DOHC, 8 Dell'Orto 20 mm carburettors
- Bore / stroke: 44 mm × 41 mm (1.7 in × 1.6 in)
- Top speed: 275 km/h (171 mph)
- Power: 78 hp (58 kW) at 12000 rpm
- Transmission: choice of 4, 5 or 6 gears
- Brakes: drum
- Tires: Front: 2.75" x 19"; Rear: 3.00" x 20
- Weight: 148 kg (326 lb) (dry)

The Moto Guzzi V8, Moto Guzzi Otto Cilindri (original name in Italian, meaning "eight cylinders") or "the Otto" motorcycle was designed by Giulio Cesare Carcano specifically for the Moto Guzzi Grand Prix racing team for the 1955 to 1957 seasons. Though following the two-stroke Galbusera V8 of 1938, the Moto Guzzi Otto motorcycle and its engine represent a unique and historically significant engineering milestone.

The Discovery Channel ranked the Moto Guzzi Otto as one of the ten greatest motorbikes of all time.

== History ==
By 1955, Moto Guzzi had already demonstrated its engineering prowess, creating motorcycles with a wide breadth of configurations: horizontal singles, parallel twins, V-twins in in-line and transverse layouts, 3-cylinders, and 4-cylinders in horizontal and in-line form. The Moto Guzzi V8 reinforced Moto Guzzi's commitment to pushing engineering boundaries. The engine was conceived by Giulio Carcano just after the 1954 Monza Grand Prix and designed by Dr. Carcano.

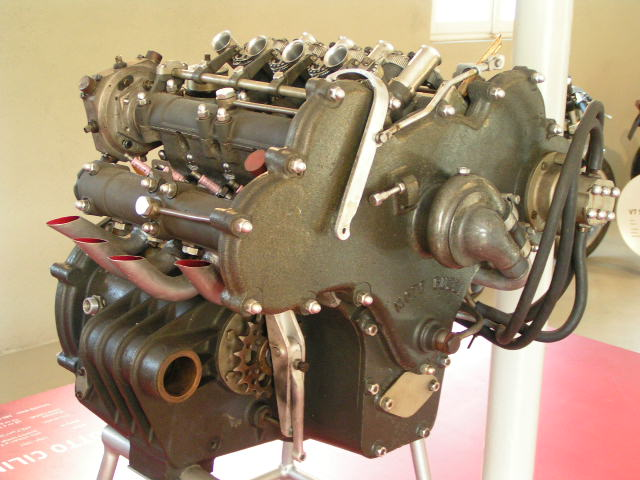
The DOHC V8 at the Moto Guzzi Museum, Mandello del Lario

To introduce the bike, and build publicity, Moto Guzzi's racing team manager released a letter to the international motorcycle press announcing Moto Guzzi's plans for the 1955 Grand Prix season—attaching a drawing of the new Otto and challenging them to guess the configuration of Moto Guzzi's then very secret racing bike. Very few guessed correctly, and the Otto made a stunning public debut a few months later.

The engine and the bike were without precedent: a water-cooled, 500 cc (31 cu in) V-8 motorcycle — with dual overhead cams and a separate carburetor for each of the eight cylinders. Weighing only 45 kg (99 lb) (overall bike weight 148 kg (326 lb)), its miniaturized components tightly packed, the engine produced 78 hp (58 kW) at 12000 rpm. The motorcycle proved capable of achieving 275 km/h (171 mph), setting a precedent in Grand Prix motorcycle racing that would remain unsurpassed for twenty years.

Tyre, brake and suspension technology, however, lagged behind the powerful engine—making race course field testing difficult and actual racing dangerous. Fergus Anderson crashed the motorcycle on its maiden run in Modena. Only Fergus Anderson, Stanley Woods, Dickie Dale, Ken Kavanagh, Keith Campbell, Giuseppe Colnago, Bill Lomas and Alano Montanari were ever able to even ride the V8 motorcycle. Several of the riders experienced spectacular falls—Bill Lomas suffering a head injury at the 1956 Senigallia Grand Prix. Ken Kavanagh refused to ride the motorcycle after the 1956 race at Spa-Francorchamps.

The Otto Cilindri also proved complex and expensive to build, in addition to the danger the bike posed to the racers themselves. By 1957 there were two bikes available and no one willing to race the bike without further development. Instead, the Otto remained undeveloped, as Moto Guzzi and other manufacturers withdrew from racing entirely in the 1957 season. Speculation suggests that with further development, the V8 could have proved a formidable Grand Prix contender.

Two authentic examples of the engine remain in the possession of Moto Guzzi, at the Moto Guzzi Museum in Mandello. For the 2013 Guzzi World Days (Giornate Mondiali Guzzi, GMG) gathering, the racing bike was rolled out and started for the crowd to hear the sound of the unmuffled V8's exhaust.

== See also ==
- List of motorcycles of the 1950s
