= Clymer (surname) =

Clymer and Climer is a surname. Notable people with the surname include:

- Adam Clymer (1937–2018), American journalist
- Ben Clymer (born 1978), ice hockey player
- Benjamin Clymer (born 1982), American business executive
- Charlotte Clymer (born 1986), American activist
- Eleanor Clymer (1906–2001), children's author
- Ella Maria Dietz Clymer (1847–1920), American actress, poet
- Floyd Clymer (1895–1970), motorcycle racer, dealer, publisher
- George Clymer (1739–1813), Declaration of Independence signatory
- George Clymer (inventor) (c. 1754–1834), printer and inventor
- Hiester Clymer (1827–1884), Pennsylvania politician of the Hiester Family
- John Clymer (1907–1989), American artist
- John B. Clymer (1887–1937), screenwriter
- Mary Willing Clymer (1770–1852), Philadelphia socialite
- Paul Clymer (born 1937), Pennsylvania politician
- Otis Clymer (1876–1926), baseball player
- Reuben Swinburne Clymer (1878–1966), American occultist
- Wayne K. Clymer (1917–2013), American United Methodist bishop

== Climer ==
- David Climer (1953–2020), American reporter
- Naomi Climer (born 1964), British engineer
