= Caburn Engineering =

British automobile manufacturer

Caburn Engineering Limited
- Company type: Limited company
- Industry: Automobiles
- Founded: 1997
- Founder: Andrew Michael Hitchings; David Hitchings
- Headquarters: Haywards Heath, West Sussex
- Website: http://caburn.uk/

Caburn Engineering Limited is a British manufacturer of automobiles.

== Company history ==
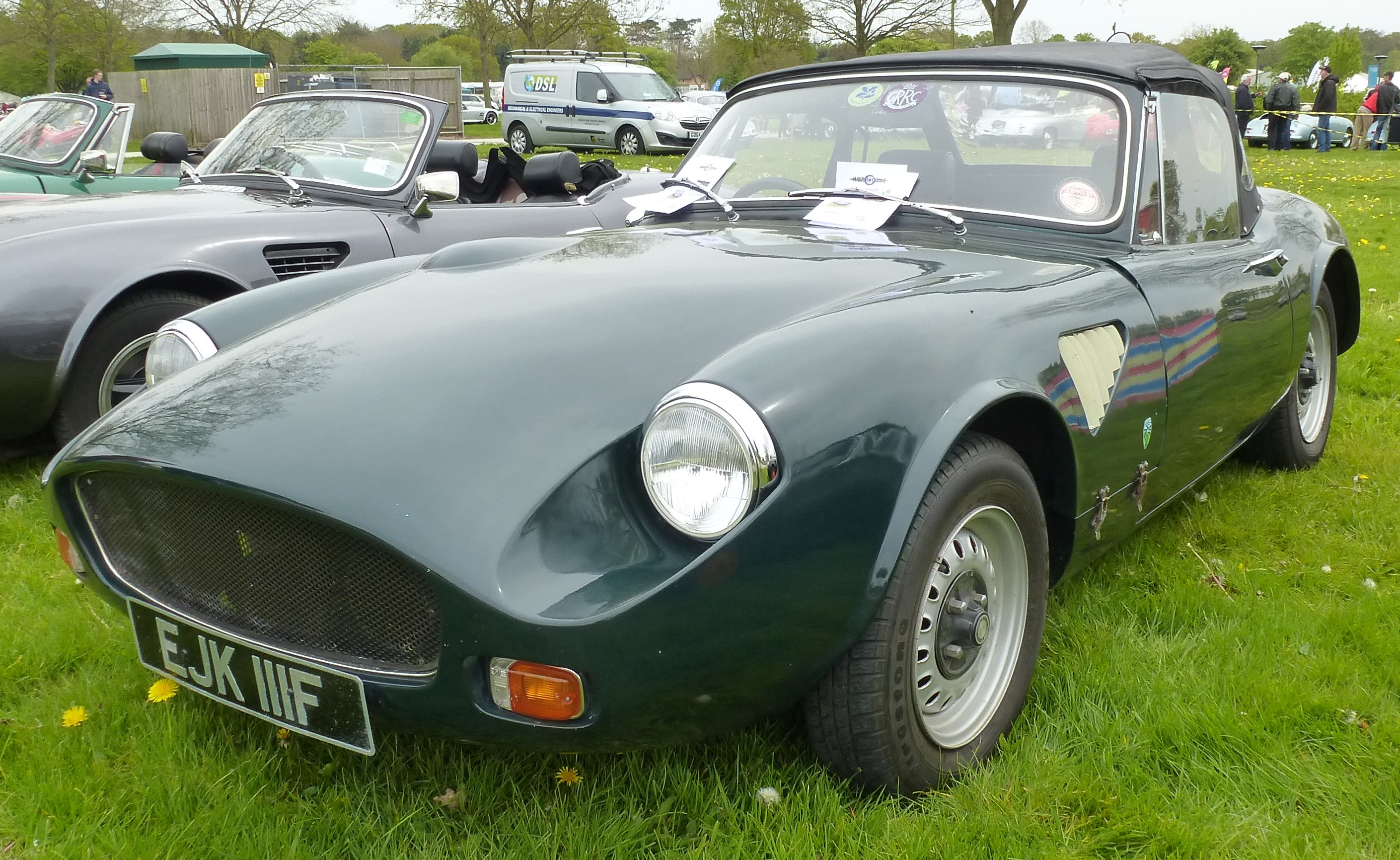
Caburn Hurricane

Andrew Michael Hitchings and his father David Hitchings began producing automobiles and kits in 1995. They founded the company on April 18, 1997, in Haywards Heath, West Sussex. The brand name is, among other things: Caburn.

== Vehicles ==
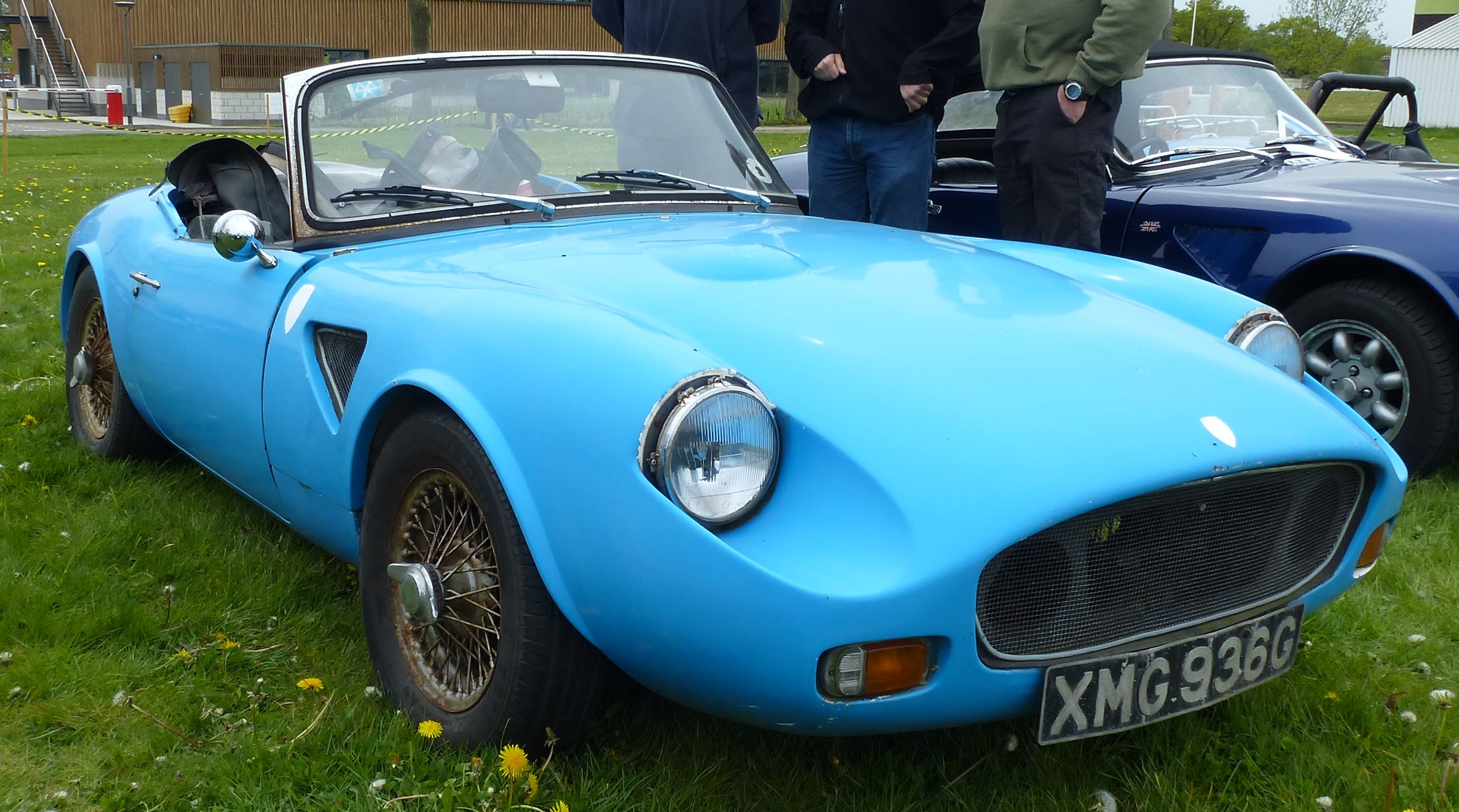
Caburn Hurricane

The first and best-selling model is the Caburn Hurricane, which has been on sale since 1995. The model was previously sold by various manufacturers under the Vincent brand and the model name Hurricane. This is a roadster. The basis is a chassis from Triumph. The Triumph Spitfire with a four-cylinder engine and the Triumph GT6 with a six-cylinder engine come into question. A total of around 65 vehicles of this model have been built so far.

In 2007 Caburn Engineering presented the Caburn Roadster. IPS Developments originally manufactured the model from 1992 to 1995 and offered it as the Hadleigh Sprint. The vehicle is similar to Morgan models. The basis is a spaceframe frame with aluminum panels. Ford Sierra engines power the vehicles. In total, the two manufacturers have produced around six vehicles together.

Since 2009, Caburn Engineering has been trying to reissue the Teal Type 59, which was manufactured by Teal Cars until 1997. This is a replica of the Bugatti Type 59.

The Caburn GP 57 appeared in 2010. The design originally came from Brooke Cars and was offered between 1991 and 1993 as the Brooke 245. The racing sports car is available as a single-seater and tandem-seater. In total, Brooke Cars and Caburn Engineering have produced around four examples so far.

In the same year, Caburn Engineering took over the Elysee project, which was previously manufactured by Gemini Cars from 1991 to 1999 and JB Sportscars from 1999 to 2001 and offered under the Elysee brand. Caburn Engineering developed a new chassis suitable for housing engines from the Ford Sierra. The open body is similar to the Lotus Elan. A total of around 20 examples have been produced by the three manufacturers so far.

== Literature ==
- Steve Hole: A-Z of Kit Cars. The definitive encyclopaedia of the UK's kit-car industry since 1949. Haynes Publishing, Sparkford 2012, ISBN 978-1-84425-677-8, p. 44, 85, 116, 250 and 268.
