= Clymer =

Clymer may refer to:

== Name ==
- Clymer (surname)

== Places ==
=== United States ===
- Clymer, New York, a town in Chautauqua County
- Clymer, Pennsylvania, a borough in Indiana County
- Clymer Township, Tioga County, Pennsylvania

== Publications ==
- Clymer repair manual, repair manuals for various powersports machines
