= Kenny Roberts =

American motorcycle racer (born 1951)

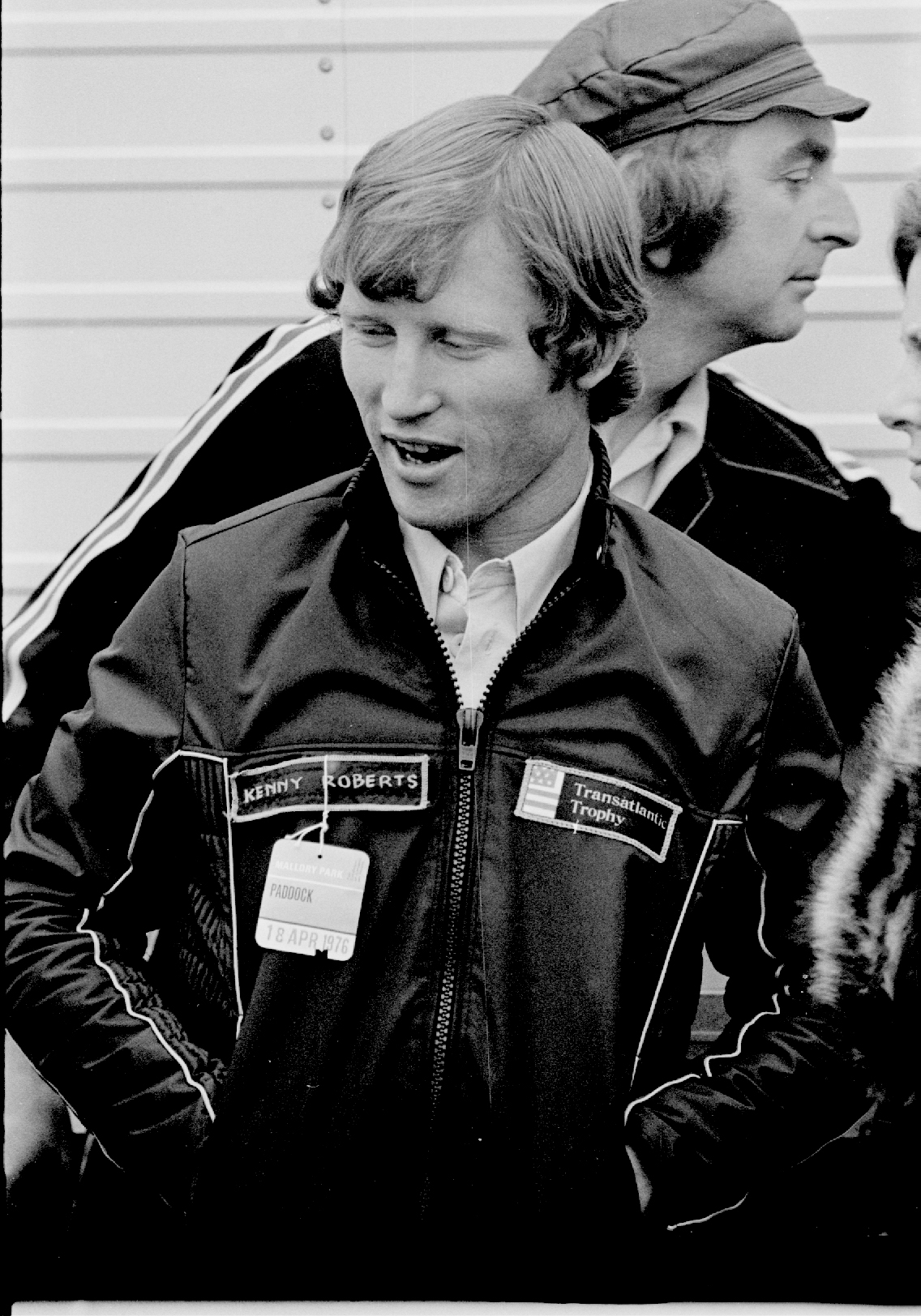
- Roberts in 1975
- Nationality: American
- Born: December 31, 1951 (age 74); Modesto, California, U.S.
Motorcycle racing career statistics
Grand Prix motorcycle racing
| Active years | 1974, 1978 – 1983 |
| First race | 1974 250 cc Dutch TT |
| Last race | 1983 500 cc San Marino Grand Prix |
| First win | 1978 250cc Venezuelan Grand Prix |
| Last win | 1983 500 cc San Marino Grand Prix |
| Team | Yamaha |
| Championships | 500 cc – 1978, 1979, 1980 |
Starts / Wins / Podiums / Poles / F. laps / Points; 60 / 24 / 44 / 22 / 27 / 658

Kenneth Leroy Roberts (born December 31, 1951) is an American former professional motorcycle racer and racing team owner. In 1978, he became the first American to win a Grand Prix motorcycle racing world championship. He was also a two-time winner of the A.M.A. Grand National Championship. Roberts is one of only four riders in American Motorcyclist Association (AMA) racing history to win the AMA Grand Slam, representing Grand National wins at a mile, half-mile, short-track, TT Steeplechase and road race events.

Roberts left his mark on Grand Prix motorcycle racing as a world championship winning rider, a safety advocate, a racing team owner, and as a motorcycle engine and chassis constructor. His dirt track-based riding style changed the way Grand Prix motorcycles were ridden. Roberts' proposal to create a rival motorcycle championship in 1979 broke the Fédération Internationale de Motocyclisme (FIM) hegemony and increased the political clout of Grand Prix racers, which subsequently led to improved safety standards and a new era of professionalism in the sport. In 2000, Roberts was named a Grand Prix Legend by the FIM. He is also the father of 2000 Grand Prix world champion Kenny Roberts Jr.

== Early life ==
Kenny Roberts was born to Alice and Melton "Buster" Roberts in Modesto, California. As a child growing up in the rural agriculture area just off highway 132 near the West side vineyards of E & J Gallo Winery, Roberts was originally interested in horseback riding. He rode his first motorcycle at the age of 12 when a friend dared him to ride a mini bike. Roberts accepted the challenge and the experience thrilled him. He built his own motorcycle by attaching his father's lawn mower engine to a bicycle frame. Roberts began his career in dirt track racing after attending a local race in Modesto and deciding that he wanted to compete himself. His father purchased a Tohatsu bike for him, but once it proved itself uncompetitive as a race bike, he moved up to a more powerful Hodaka motorcycle.

Roberts showed a natural talent for dirt track racing and began winning local races. In 1968, his race results drew the attention of a local Suzuki dealer Bud Aksland, who offered to sponsor Roberts aboard a Suzuki motorcycle. He made the decision to drop out of high school before his senior year to pursue a career in motorcycle racing. Roberts was allowed to compete professionally when he turned 18, and on the day after his eighteenth birthday, he entered his first professional race at San Francisco's Cow Palace, finishing in fourth place.

== Racing history ==
=== Early AMA career ===
Realizing that Roberts needed more help if his racing career was going to progress, Aksland introduced Roberts to airline pilot and amateur motorcycle racer Jim Doyle, who would become Roberts' personal manager. In 1971, Doyle and Roberts approached Triumph's American distributor to ask about the possibility of a sponsored ride, but were told that Roberts was too small for one of their motorcycles.

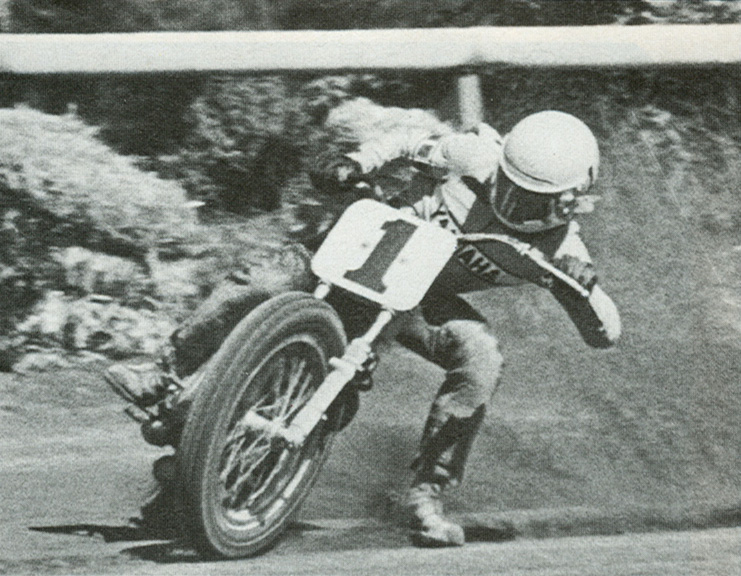
Roberts in 1974 competing in an AMA Grand National Championship dirt track event.

They then turned to the American Yamaha importer's team, who agreed to make Roberts a factory sponsored rider at the age of 19. Yamaha asked the head of their American racing program, former 250 cc world champion Kel Carruthers to help guide Roberts' racing career. It marked the beginning of a long and productive relationship between the two men. Carruthers ended his riding career after the 1973 season to concentrate full-time on maintaining and tuning Roberts' motorcycles while mentoring him in the AMA Grand National Championship, while Doyle remained as his business manager.

The AMA Grand National Championship was a series which encompassed events in four distinctive dirt track disciplines plus road racing. In his second professional race as a rookie expert class rider in 1972, Roberts rode to victory at the Grand National short-track race in the Houston Astrodome. A few weeks later at the 1972 Daytona 200, Roberts continued to impress observers when he rode a 350cc Yamaha TD3 to qualify on the front row of the starting grid with the fifth fastest time. He led the race for one lap before he suffered a flat tire. At the end his first year of national competition, . Roberts made a name for himself that year by battling the dominant Harley-Davidson factory dirt track team aboard an underpowered Yamaha XS650 motorcycle, making up for his lack of horsepower with sheer determination. He finished the season ranked fourth in the country.

=== Saarinen's influence ===
After Jarno Saarinen won the 1972 250cc World Championship, he travelled to the United States to compete in the 1972 Champion Spark Plug Classic held at the Ontario Motor Speedway. Saarinen was considered one of the top road racers in the world, having challenged the previously dominant Giacomo Agostini for the 350cc world championship. While Roberts had a natural talent for riding motorcycles on dirt surfaces, on paved road circuits, his motorcycle felt unsettled beneath him while negotiating a turn. From a trackside vantage point during the pre-race practice session, Roberts observed how Saarinen shifted his body weight towards the inside of a turn. He experimented with Saarinen's technique and found that it helped settle the motorcycle. He adopted the cornering style and exaggerated the body shift even further by hanging off his motorcycle and holding his knee out until it skimmed the track surface.

Roberts' motorcycle racing career came at a time when motorcycle engine development rapidly outpaced chassis and tire technology. As two-stroke engine technology continued to improve, tire manufacturers began producing wider tires to manage the increasing horsepower being developed. The wider tires created forces that made the motorcycle try to stand itself upright while leaned into a corner, which made it necessary for riders to hang off their motorcycles. After adopting Saarinen's cornering technique, Roberts began to excel in road race events.

=== AMA Grand National Champion ===
In 1973, in just his second season as an expert, Roberts won the AMA Grand National Championship. Despite his Yamaha dirt track motorcycle lacking the horsepower of the Harley-Davidson team, he won three races and consistently finished among the top ten, amassing a record 2,014 points in the 25-race series.

=== First European competitions ===
He is a small man dressed in yellow and most clearly from another world.

— Photographer Franco Villani on why Roberts was nicknamed The Martian

In the 1974 Daytona 200, after early leader Gary Nixon retired, Roberts battled for the lead with former 500 cc world champion, Giacomo Agostini before an overheated engine forced him to settle for second place. In April 1974, Roberts ventured to Europe for the first time to compete in the prestigious Imola 200 road race for 750 cc motorcycles where he made a positive impression competing against the best road racers in the world. Wearing the trademark bumble bee yellow and black racing livery of the Yamaha USA team, Roberts took the lead at the start of the race with Agostini in second place. He began to build his lead over Agostini until his tires began to lose their adhesion, forcing him to reduce his speed, and eventually allowing Agostini to overtake him for the victory.

Although Roberts finished second to Agostini once again, his first European racing experience left a deep impression on him as he marveled at the size of the crowds and the warmth of the Italian fans. Roberts' first European performance also left an impression on European race fans, as few had ever witnessed a Grand Prix motorcycle sliding its rear tire, in a bucking bronco manner as it sought to regain traction. Italian journalists labelled him "Il Marciano", or the Martian due to his small stature, his bright yellow riding suit and his seemingly otherworldly riding abilities.

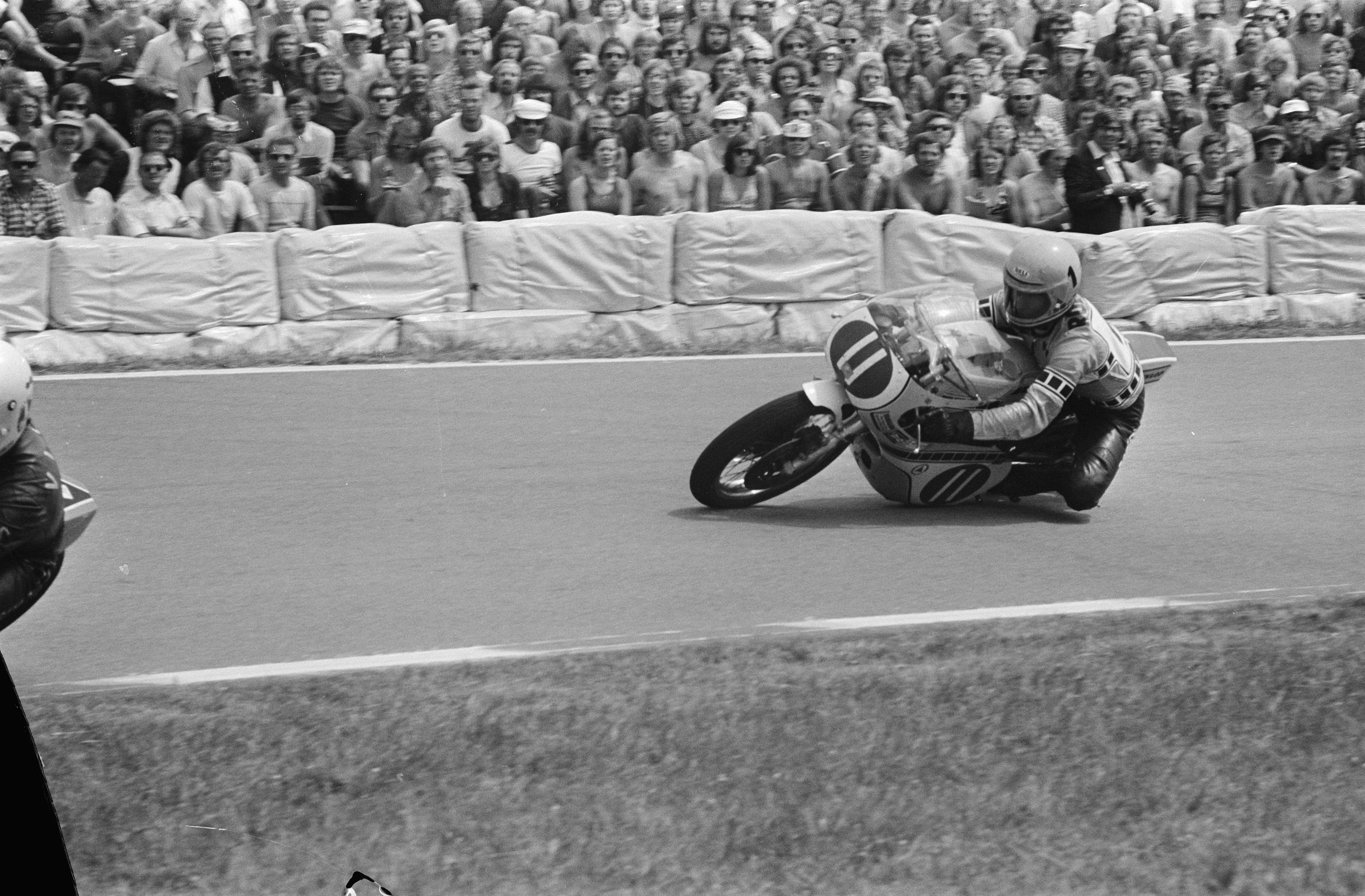
Roberts (11) racing in the 1974 250cc Dutch TT, his first world championship Grand Prix race

Roberts then traveled to England with a team of American riders to compete against a British riding team in the 1974 Transatlantic Trophy match races. The Transatlantic Trophy match races pitted the best British riders against the top American road racers on 750cc motorcycles in a six-race series in England. The conventional wisdom at the time was that American riders, who competed mostly in dirt track races, could not race on asphalt at the same level as the British riders, who specialized in road racing events. Roberts dispelled any such notions by winning three of the six races and finishing second in the remaining three races. Roberts was the top individual points scorer in the event with 93 points, five more than Barry Sheene, the top British rider.

Following his success at Imola and the Transatlantic Trophy match races earlier that year, Roberts returned to Europe to make his road racing world championship debut in a one-off appearance in the 250cc class at the Dutch TT on June 29, 1974. Against the world's top competitors, Roberts claimed pole position during qualifying then, broke Mike Hailwood's seven-year-old lap record while pursuing race leader and eventual world champion Walter Villa. Roberts eventually crashed, but recovered to finish on the podium with a third-place finish.

=== Second National Championship ===
In the 1974 Grand National championship, Roberts won the San Jose Half-Mile dirt track race then, won his first national road race at Road Atlanta on June 2, 1974. On August 18, Roberts won the Peoria TT race to complete a Grand Slam with victories in each of the five different events on the Grand National calendar. He claimed his second consecutive Grand National championship, winning six races and surpassing his 1973 points record by scoring 2,286 points in the 23 race series, collecting points in all 23 races.

Roberts continued his road racing successes in 1975, winning three out of four races in the 1975 Transatlantic Match races. After having won the national championship in 1974, Roberts faced an increasingly difficult battle in dirt track races, as Harley-Davidson continued to improve their XR-750 dirt tracker while Yamaha struggled to maintain the pace. Roberts made up for his bike's lack of power with an almost fearless, determined riding style. He battled Harley-Davidson factory rider Gary Scott throughout the 1975 season but mechanical breakdowns hampered his title defense. He had been leading the Daytona 200 when mechanical problems yielded the victory to his Yamaha teammate Gene Romero. At the Ascot TT, Roberts battled from 17th place to take the lead before a broken sprocket ended his race.

=== 1975 Indy Mile victory ===
"They don't pay me enough to ride that thing".

— Roberts commenting after his Indy Mile victory aboard the soon-to-be-banned Yamaha TZ750 dirt track motorcycle.

Roberts' fearless riding style was highlighted at the 1975 Indy Mile Grand National. In a desperate effort to keep Scott within reach in the points chase, Roberts and Carruthers built a dirt track frame to house a 170 mph Yamaha TZ750 two-stroke road racing engine. The motorcycle wasn't completed until just before race time so Roberts had never ridden it until he arrived for the race in Indianapolis. He spent the practice period trying to learn how to cope with the excessive amount of wheel spin caused by the high horsepower engine and then barely qualified for the main race as he struggled with the steep learning curve of the new motorcycle. His poor qualifying performance put him on the last row of the starting grid.

Once the race began, he spent the first few laps experimenting with different techniques in an effort to discover how to gain traction. As Roberts learned to control his horsepower advantage, he began to work his way from last place through the field as his two stroke motorcycle emitted a high pitched wail throughout the venue that energized the spectators into a frenzy as they watched his progress. In order to maintain speed, he was forced to ride along the outer edge of the race track, often having his foot peg clipping the hay bales placed around the circuit perimeter as a safety measure. On the last lap of the race, Roberts caught and passed the factory Harley-Davidson factory teammates of Corky Keener and Jay Springsteen to win the race by inches. Afterward, Roberts was famously quoted as saying, "They don't pay me enough to ride that thing". The AMA responded to Roberts' Indy Mile victory by banning two-stroke motorcycles in 1976. Roberts later recalled the Indy Mile victory on the Yamaha TZ750 as the most significant dirt track accomplishment of his career.

Despite accomplishing another Grand Slam, this time in only one season, Roberts lost his crown, finishing second to Gary Scott in the 1975 national championship.

=== Later Grand National Championship career ===
Although Roberts won four Grand Nationals in 1976, he continued to experience mechanical misfortunes as well as a horsepower deficit to the Harley-Davidson motorcycles in the mile and half-mile dirt track events. He had been leading the Daytona 200 once again when tire troubles forced him to make a lengthy pit stop, and Johnny Cecotto went on to win the race. He also led the Loudon Classic when a lapped rider collided with him causing him to crash out of the race. He dropped to third in the national championship as Jay Springsteen claimed the title for the Harley-Davidson team.

We don't have to equal Harley's power, we just have to get within about 10 percent. Having Kenny on the bike is worth at least that much.

— Yamaha Official prior to the 1977 Grand National Championship.

Roberts returned to England in April 1977, winning four out of six races at the 1977 Transatlantic Match races. Roberts then travelled to Italy where he raced in the Imola 200, leaving no doubt he was capable of competing at the international level by winning both legs and setting a new track record.

Back in the United States, he won five of the six road races that made up the pavement portion of the Grand National championship. In the road race event at Sears Point, Roberts started the race at the back of the pack and passed the entire field within four laps to win the race. Despite being in contention for much of the season, Roberts was unable to win any of the dirt track events and eventually finished the year in fourth place.

=== First American world champion ===
When it became apparent that Yamaha could not develop a dirt track motorcycle capable of competing with the dominant Harley-Davidson dirt track team, the American Yamaha importer, Yamaha USA, offered to send Roberts to Europe in 1978 to compete in the World Championship Grand Prix road racing series, along with Kel Carruthers to act as his mentor and crew chief. At first, Roberts resisted the move to racing in Europe as he felt that he had left unfinished business racing against the Harley Davidson team in the AMA Grand National Championship but, realized that Yamaha didn't have a competitive dirt track motorcycle. Before going to Europe, Roberts met with executives of the Goodyear tire company who became both his financial backers and tire supplier for his upcoming world championship campaign.

The team planned to compete in the 250 cc world championship as well as the Formula 750 series in order to have more practice time to learn the tracks, but their main focus would be on the 500 cc class, considered the premier class at the time. His main competition in the 500 cc world championship would come from Yamaha's Johnny Cecotto and Suzuki teammates Barry Sheene and Pat Hennen. Sheene was the winner of the two previous titles. Roberts said that he was initially indifferent about competing in Europe, but when he read that Sheene had labeled him as "no threat", he made up his mind to compete. Few observers gave Roberts any chance of winning the championship, citing the reasoning that it would take him at least one season to learn the European circuits.

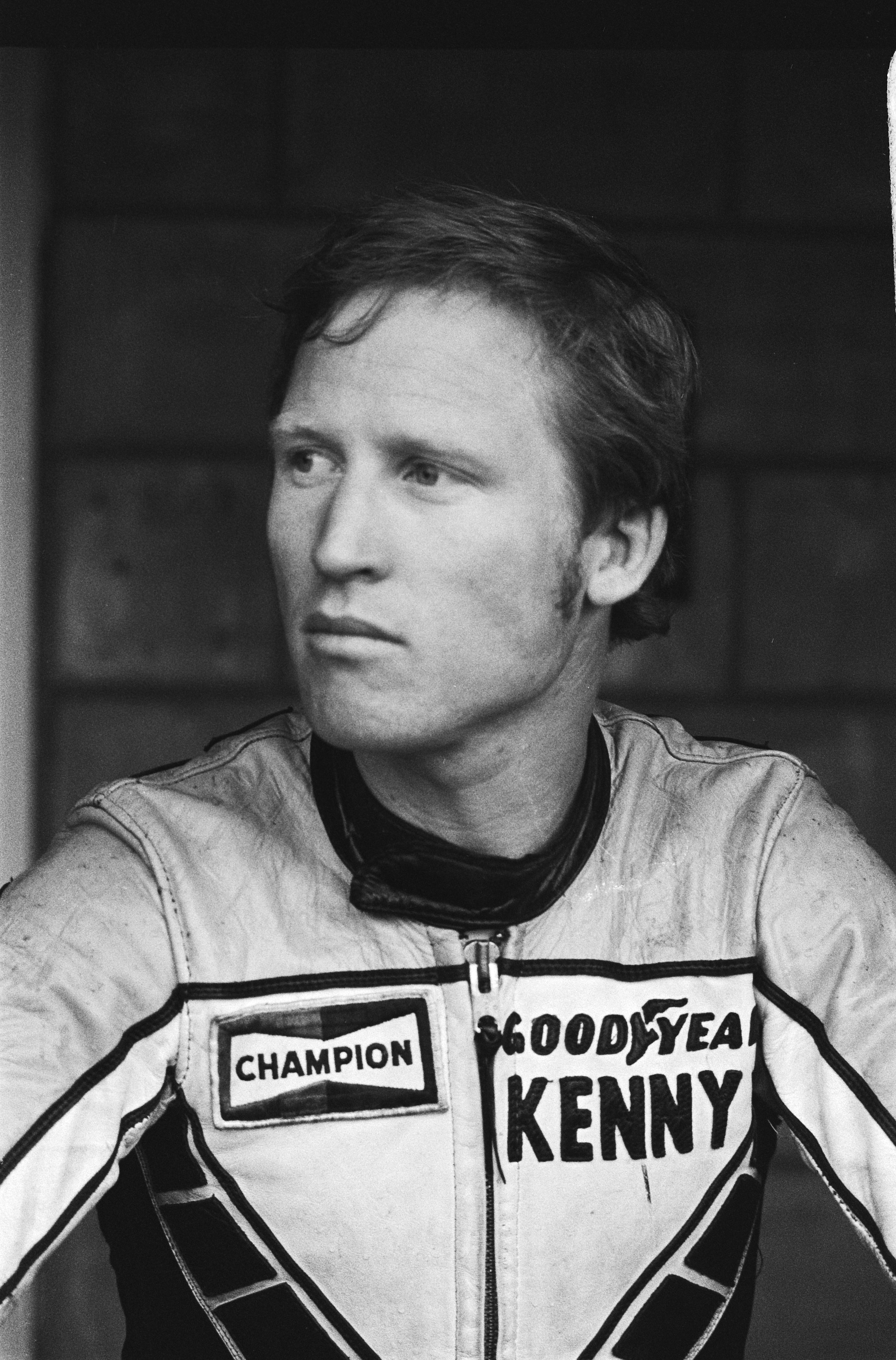
Roberts in 1978

The motorcycle technology of the late 1970s featured engines with power in excess of what the frames and tires of the day could accommodate. Roberts' riding style, bred on the dirt tracks of America, revolutionized road racing. Prior to his arrival in Europe, riders focused on attaining high entry speeds into corners, leaving braking until the last possible moment, then carving graceful arcs through the corners with both wheels in line. Roberts did just the opposite, braking early, then quickly applying the throttle which resulted in the rear tire breaking traction and spinning. The resulting tire spin caused the motorcycle to buck and shake as it continually lost then regained traction, creating a brutal, violent riding style that no one had ever seen before on the racetracks of Europe. His riding style was reminiscent of dirt track riding, where sliding the rear tire to one side is used as a method to steer the motorcycle around a corner. Because of his early application of the throttle, he was able to attain top speed faster than his competitors.

The 1978 season started with Roberts winning the Daytona 200 in a dominating fashion. After several near misses forced him to retire while leading the event, Roberts lapped the entire field en route to his first Daytona victory. He then won a rain-shortened Imola 200 race and was the second highest individual scorer behind Pat Hennen at the 1978 Transatlantic Match races.

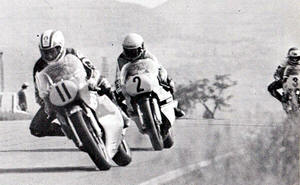
Roberts (2) follows Marco Lucchinelli (11) during the 1978 Nations Grand Prix at Mugello. Roberts would eventually go on to win the race.

The 1978 world championship chase did not start well for Roberts at the season-opening round in Venezuela. Although Roberts won the 250 cc Grand Prix, Sheene claimed the victory in the 500 cc Venezuelan Grand Prix while Roberts' Yamaha suffered a mechanical failure on the starting line. The championship then moved to Europe where Roberts would experience his first encounter with FIM bureaucracy at the Spanish Grand Prix.

The promoter of the Spanish Grand Prix, Don Nicolás Rodil del Valle, was also the president of the FIM. Roberts began to realize that many of the world championship race promoters were connected to the FIM ruling body, an arrangement that left little incentive to make safety improvements to the race circuits. Roberts was accustomed to racing in the AMA where competitors could rely on an AMA referee to ensure that race promoters provided a safe venue; however, competitors racing in the FIM world championships were provided no such recourse.

When Roberts arrived at the 1978 Spanish Grand Prix, he was denied entry into the 500cc race. As Roberts had withdrawn from the previous Grand Prix in Venezuela, Spanish race promoters claimed to have no record of Roberts' previous 500cc class experience. The thought that race organizers feigned having no knowledge of the Yamaha factory sponsored American champion incensed Roberts, who felt that the FIM was trying to exert their authority on the newcomer. Eventually the FIM relented and Roberts was allowed to race. He responded by taking the pole position and setting the lap record. In the race itself, Roberts led by eight seconds when his throttle stuck open, allowing Pat Hennen to pass and relegate him to second place.

Roberts then won his first-ever 500 cc Grand Prix with a win in Austria, quickly followed by two more victories in France and Italy, along with two second-place finishes in the Netherlands and Belgium. At the 1978 Swedish Grand Prix, Roberts crashed during practice for the 250 cc race, sustaining a concussion and a thumb injury. Shaken up by the accident, he could do no better than seventh place in the 500 cc race. Sheene had come down with a debilitating virus at the Venezuelan round, but a string of podium finishes and a victory at the Swedish Grand Prix combined with Roberts' failure to score any points in the Finnish Grand Prix, allowed him to close the points gap.

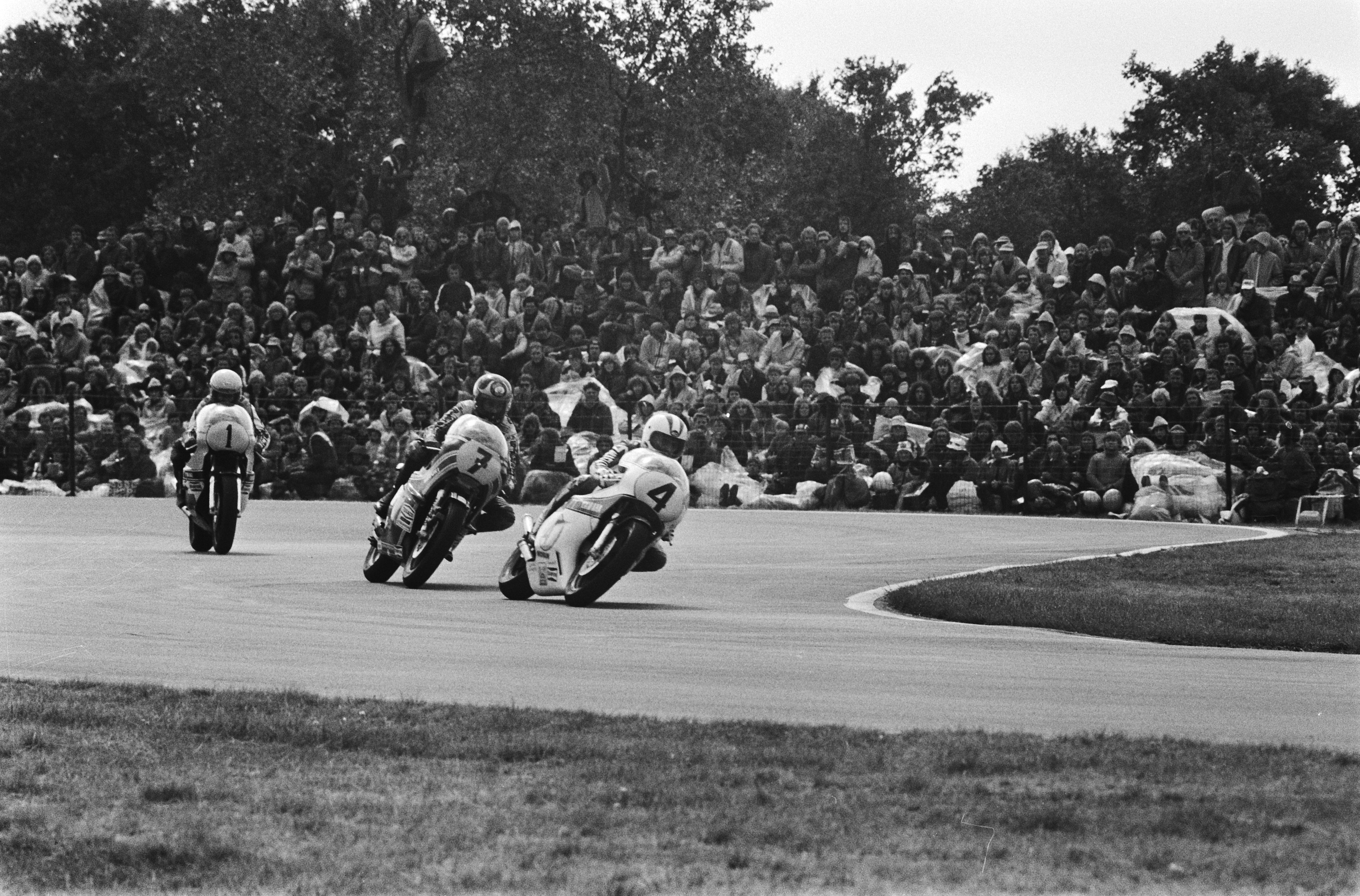
Kenny Roberts (1) pursues Johnny Cecotto (4) and Barry Sheene (7) during the 1978 500cc Dutch TT race

The two championship contenders arrived in England for the British Grand Prix with only three points separating them. The race ended in controversy when torrential rains during the race, along with pit stops for tire changes by both Roberts and Sheene, created confusion among official scorers. Eventually, Roberts was declared the winner with Sheene being awarded third place behind privateer Steve Manship, who did not stop for a tire change.

The final race of the season was the German Grand Prix held at the daunting, 14.2-mile-long (22.9 km) Nürburgring racetrack, considered too dangerous for the Formula One championship. Roberts broke the unofficial lap record during practice then qualified second and finished in third place, ahead of Sheene in fourth place to claim the first world championship for an American rider in Grand Prix road racing history. He also scored four victories to finish second behind Johnny Cecotto in the Formula 750 world championship, and won two races to finish fourth in the 250 cc world championship.

=== The rebel leader ===
"I told them I didn't want their trophy. I told them they should melt it down and sell it. I heard they needed the money.".

— Roberts commenting after his refusal to accept the winner's trophy at the 1979 Spanish Grand Prix.

The 1979 season began disastrously for Roberts when he suffered career-threatening back injuries and a ruptured spleen in a pre-season crash while testing a motorcycle in Japan. His injuries caused him to miss the season opening Grand Prix in Venezuela, but he completed an impressive recovery by winning the second round in Austria, followed by a second place in Germany, and another victory in Italy.

Controversy again surrounded Roberts at the Spanish Grand Prix when Spanish race organisers, knowing that Roberts had to race to maintain his points lead, refused to pay him starting money as guaranteed by FIM regulations. An angered Roberts went on to win the race, and then proceeded to the podium where he refused to accept the winner's trophy, telling the promoters that they should melt their trophy and sell it in order to help pay the competitors' expenses.

The FIM initially suspended the championship points leader for his unprecedented actions, but the suspension was later reduced to probation. Roberts' act was merely a symbolic protest, as the FIM felt no compulsion to change the status quo, however his act of standing up to the FIM's shoddy treatment resonated loudly among his fellow competitors and signaled a break from the old ways, galvanizing them into taking action to make further rider demands for increased safety.

Further controversy ensued at the Belgian Grand Prix at the Spa circuit. The circuit had been paved just days before the race, creating a track that many of the racers felt was unsafe due to diesel fuel seeping to the surface. Roberts and the new championship points leader, Virginio Ferrari, instigated a riders' revolt and refused to race. Once again, the FIM responded by suspending Roberts and Ferrari. The FIM later reduced this to another probation. The event highlighted the animosity between Roberts and the FIM concerning track safety. Roberts further irritated the FIM when he began talking to the press about forming a rival racing series to compete against the FIM's monopoly. He also began to make appeals to his fellow riders to join him in breaking away from the FIM's control.

The series then moved on to Britain, where Roberts would be involved in one of the closest races in Grand Prix history. Roberts' battle with Sheene at the 1979 British Grand Prix at Silverstone has been cited as one of the greatest races of the 1970s. Minutes before the start of the race, Roberts' Yamaha blew a seal and sprayed the bike with oil. His crew managed to replace the seal in time, but Roberts went to the starting line with his gloves coated with oil, causing his hand to slip on the throttle during the race. The race began with Roberts, Sheene and Dutch rider Wil Hartog breaking away from the rest of the field of riders. Hartog eventually fell behind as Roberts and Sheene continued to battle for the lead. The event featured numerous lead changes throughout the 28 lap race, with Roberts winning ahead of Sheene by a narrow margin of just three-hundredths of a second. A third-place finish in the season-ending French Grand Prix, along with a crash by his main championship rival Ferrari, secured his second consecutive world championship. Roberts ended the season with a victory at the prestigious Mallory Park Race of the Year.

In December 1979, Roberts made good on his threats when he, along with the other top world championship riders, released a letter to the press announcing their intention to break away from the FIM and create a rival race series called the World Series. When Roberts first arrived on the Grand Prix scene, motorcycle racers were competing in front of tens of thousands of paying spectators for as little prize money as $200, at venues such as the Imatra Circuit in Finland that featured railroad crossings and hay bales wrapped around telephone poles. Rather than suitable financial compensation for risking their lives, race organizers expected riders to race for prestige and the opportunity to compete for world championship points. In 1956, the reigning 500 cc world champion, Geoff Duke and thirteen other riders were given six-month suspensions for merely threatening to strike. Roberts adopted a confrontational, sometimes belligerent stance with race promoters, challenging the previously accepted poor treatment that motorcycle racers of the day were accustomed to receiving. The FIM reacted by condemning the breakaway series and, although the competing series was not successful due to difficulties in securing enough venues, the riders had flexed their political muscles. Faced with the possibility of losing their grip on the world championship, the FIM was forced to take their demands seriously by making changes regarding rider compensation and safety. During the 1979 FIM Congress, new rules were passed substantially increasing prize money by as much as 500%, and in subsequent years stricter safety regulations were imposed on race organizers.

=== A third world championship ===
In February 1980, Roberts made a remarkable return to the American Grand National Championship for two races at the season opening Houston TT and short-track events held in the Houston Astrodome over two evenings. After more than a year away from dirt track competitions, Roberts won the Houston TT race to tie Bart Markel's career record of 28 Grand National victories. He followed that the next evening with a third place in the Houston short-track national. Returning to England once again for the 1980 Transatlantic Match races, Roberts was once again the top individual points scorer as he led the American team to victory over the British.

For the 1980 Grand Prix season, the Yamaha factory made the Yamaha USA team of Roberts and Carruthers the de facto factory racing team. The season got underway two months late due to cancellation of Austrian and Venezuelan rounds. Barry Sheene had been replaced by Randy Mamola as the top Suzuki rider, as Sheene had been dissatisfied with the Suzuki's efforts and had turned to a privateer Yamaha team. Roberts won the first three races as the Suzuki team appeared to be in disarray, but by the third race, the Suzukis of Mamola and Marco Lucchinelli were making things more difficult for Roberts. Roberts' Yamaha suffered a deflating front tire and a faulty rear shock absorber in the Dutch TT forcing him to pull out of the race, but his main championship rivals also suffered setbacks with Cecotto, Ferrari and Hartog all missing races due to injuries and Sheene suffering mechanical breakdowns. Suzuki riders went on to win the last four races, but Roberts had built up a sufficient point lead to hold on and clinch his third consecutive 500 cc world championship.

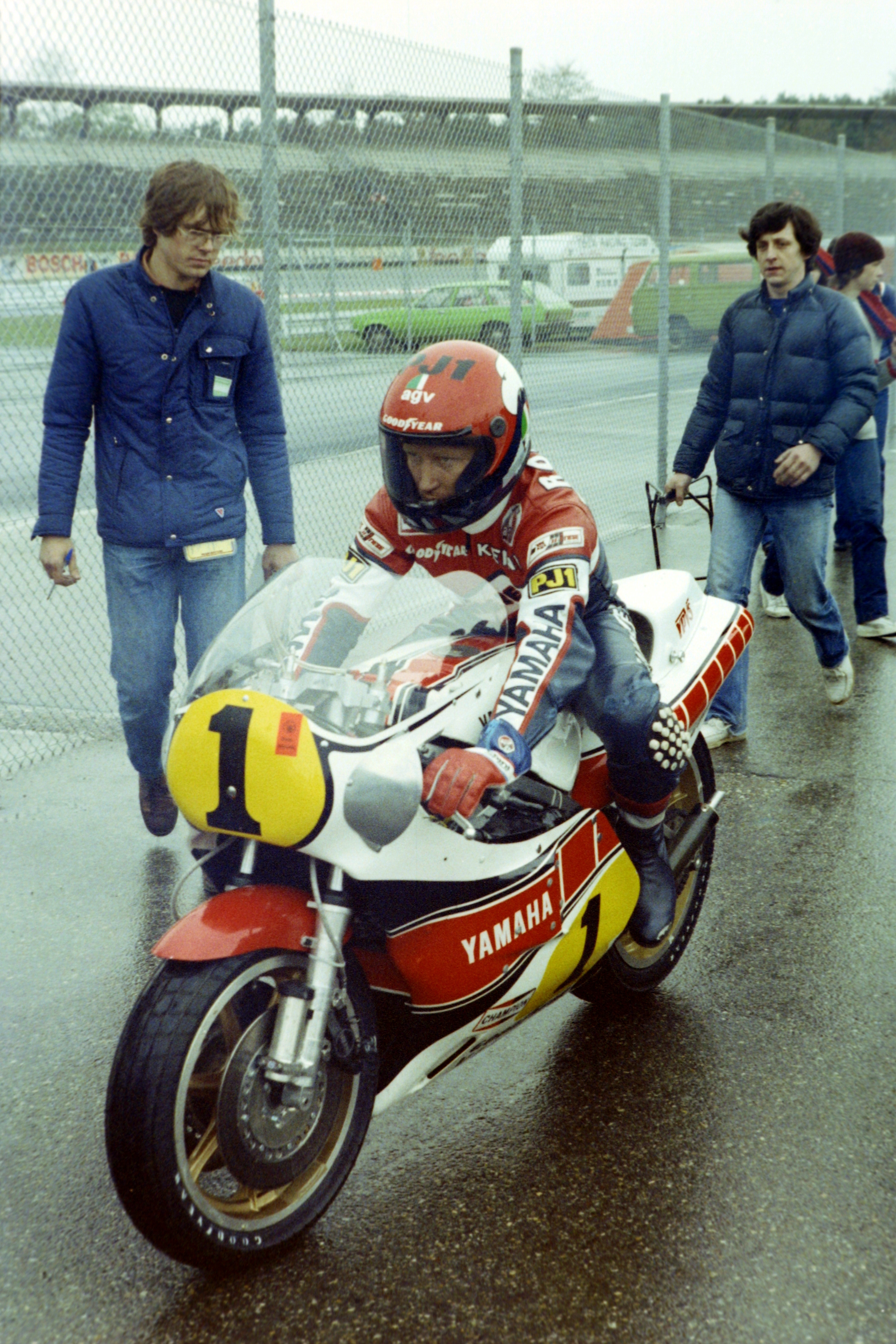
Roberts at the 1981 German Grand Prix.

=== A reversal of fortune ===
In 1981, Yamaha introduced a new square-four cylinder bike, similar to Suzuki's RG500. Roberts raced to a second-place finish behind Marco Luchinelli at the non-championship Imola 200 race. Roberts' bike had a suspension failure in the Grand Prix season opening Austrian Grand Prix, but he rebounded to win the next two races in Germany and Italy. Roberts' title hopes suffered a setback at the Dutch TT at Assen when his Yamaha's front brake pads were installed incorrectly causing his front wheel to lock up on the starting line, ending his race before it had started. He came back to score a second place behind Lucchinelli in the Belgian Grand Prix, but was once again struck by misfortune when a bad case of food poisoning forced him to miss the San Marino Grand Prix. He then narrowly lost the British Grand Prix to Jack Middelburg by three-tenths of a second before ending his season with a seventh place in Finland and a retirement in Sweden. Suzuki team riders Mamola and Lucchinelli battled to the final race of the season before the Italian claimed the championship with a total of five Grand Prix victories, with Mamola finishing in second and Roberts in third place.

Roberts switched to Dunlop tires for the 1982 season, as Goodyear pulled out of motorcycle racing. New competition had arrived as Honda entered their new two-stroke NS500 ridden by defending champion Lucchinelli, former 350 cc world champion, Takazumi Katayama and newcomer Freddie Spencer. Roberts won the season-opening round in Argentina on the old square-four Yamaha, but then switched to the new OW61 YZR500 V4 engined bike. He came in third at the Austrian Grand Prix then, sat out the French Grand Prix at Nogaro as he and the other top riders boycotted the race over unsafe track conditions. Roberts then won the Spanish Grand Prix at Jarama ahead of Sheene, and scored a second place behind Suzuki rider Franco Uncini in the Dutch TT. In a portent of things to come, Roberts was leading the Belgian Grand Prix when his Dunlop tires lost their grip and he had to settle for fourth place as Spencer went on to win his first Grand Prix for Honda. Roberts then injured his knee and finger at the British Grand Prix and had to miss the Swedish round, but by then the world championship had been claimed by Uncini with a total of five victories while Roberts fell to fourth place. With Roberts injured, Yamaha allowed his teammate Graeme Crosby a chance to ride the V4 Yamaha during practice for the season-ending German Grand Prix. The New Zealand rider declared that the experience had taken years off his life. By the end of the 1982 season, Roberts had won sixteen 500 cc Grand Prix races, more than double that of any of his contemporaries.

=== Roberts versus Spencer ===
Roberts announced that the 1983 season would be his final year in Grand Prix competition. Yamaha team manager Giacomo Agostini had been unable to agree on a contract with rider Graeme Crosby, so AMA Superbike champion Eddie Lawson was brought in as Roberts' new teammate. The 1983 battle for the championship between Roberts and Honda's Spencer would be considered one of the greatest seasons in motorcycle Grand Prix history, along with the 1967 500 cc duel between Mike Hailwood and Giacomo Agostini. Roberts began the season with his YZR500 having problems with overheating and rear suspension, while Spencer started strongly, winning the first three races and five out of the first seven. Roberts was leading the second race in France, when his Yamaha split an expansion chamber causing it to lose power as Spencer won, with Roberts falling to fourth place. In Round 3 at Monza, Roberts crashed while leading Spencer three laps from the finish. Roberts came back to win the German Grand Prix, but then finished second to Spencer in the Spanish Grand Prix in a race Spencer called one of the toughest of his career. Things began to go Roberts' way at the Austrian Grand Prix as Roberts won while Spencer's Honda suffered a crankshaft failure. In the Yugoslavian Grand Prix, Roberts' Yamaha failed to start immediately, while Spencer charged to an early lead, leaving Roberts to fight through the field to finish in fourth place. Roberts then went on a three-race winning streak with victories in the Netherlands, Belgium and England, while Spencer stayed close with a third place and two second-place finishes.

The championship then moved to the penultimate round at the Swedish Grand Prix with Spencer holding a two-point lead over Roberts. Roberts led Spencer going into the last lap of the race. Heading down the back straight, Spencer placed his Honda right behind Roberts' Yamaha as they reached the second to the last corner, a ninety degree right-hander. As both riders applied their brakes, Spencer came out of Roberts' slipstream and managed to get inside of the Yamaha. As they exited the corner, both riders ran wide off the track and into the dirt. Spencer was able to get back on the track and back on the power first, crossing the finish line just ahead of Roberts for a crucial victory. Roberts considered Spencer's pass to be foolish and dangerous, and exchanged angry words with him on the podium. Roberts would have to win the final round at the San Marino Grand Prix with Spencer finishing no better than third place in order for Roberts to win his fourth world championship. In a fitting end to a great career, Roberts won his last-ever Grand Prix race, and Spencer was able to secure second place to claim the world championship. The two riders dominated the season with each claiming six victories in the 12 race series.

Roberts continued to ride in selected events in 1984. In March, he battled Spencer to win his second consecutive Daytona 200 and third win overall. In July, Roberts won the first leg of the Laguna Seca 200, then finished second to Randy Mamola in the second leg, as Mamola was declared the winner based on aggregate times. In September 1985, he appeared at the Springfield Mile Grand National dirt track race riding a Mert Lawwill-prepared Harley-Davidson XR750, but failed to make the final.

In July 1985, Roberts won the pole position at the prestigious Suzuka 8 Hours endurance race, held in Japan. Teamed with Tadahiko Taira, the duo were leading the race until the final hour, when mechanical problems dropped them back to seventeenth place. Roberts returned to compete in the 1986 Suzuka 8 Hours, this time teaming up with American Mike Baldwin. He qualified second behind Wayne Gardner, but failed to finish the race.

=== Career statistics ===
In a 13-year professional racing career, Roberts won two Grand National Championships and three 500 cc world championships including 32 Grand Nationals and 24 Grand Prix road races. He was a three-time winner of both the Daytona 200 and the Imola 200, and was a six-time winner of the Laguna Seca 200. He was the second AMA rider after Dick Mann to accomplish the Grand Slam of winning all five events of the Grand National Championship.

== Race team manager and owner ==
After his Grand Prix racing career ended in 1983, Roberts briefly considered an auto racing career before deciding to field a Grand Prix team. In 1984, he entered a team into the 250 cc world championship with riders Wayne Rainey and Alan Carter using Yamaha bikes. In 1986, he moved up to the 500 cc world championship with riders Randy Mamola and Mike Baldwin. After returning to the United States to compete in the AMA Superbike championship, Wayne Rainey re-joined the team in 1988, finishing in third place in his inaugural 500 cc season then, improving to second place behind Eddie Lawson in 1989. In 1990, Roberts secured the financial support of the Marlboro cigarette company, and his team became the official Yamaha factory racing team. Rainey and John Kocinski won the 500 cc and 250 cc world championships in 1990, making Roberts the most successful team manager in Grand Prix racing at the time. Rainey went on to win three consecutive 500 cc world championships for Roberts' team. After Rainey was left paralyzed in a crash at the 1993 Italian Grand Prix, the Roberts team continued racing with Luca Cadalora as their main rider, but struggled during a period dominated by Honda and their rider, Mick Doohan.

In 1997, Roberts stunned the racing world when he left Yamaha after more than 25 years to start his own motorcycle company. Roberts had grown weary of battling over the direction he felt the Yamaha team needed to pursue. Basing his new company in England to take advantage of the Formula 1 industry, Roberts built a new bike powered by a three-cylinder, two-stroke engine with the engineering assistance of Tom Walkinshaw Racing. He decided to take advantage of rules allowing lighter weights for three-cylinder motorcycles after observing the agility and handling advantage of Spencer's Honda NS500 during the 1983 season. Unfortunately, by the time the motorcycle had been developed, tire technology had improved to the point where any advantage over four-cylinder bikes had been negated. The motorcycle did manage to win a pole position with rider Jeremy McWilliams taking the top qualifying position at the 2002 Australian Grand Prix against the new breed of 990 cc four-stroke MotoGP motorcycles.

With the introduction of the MotoGP class in 2002, Roberts' team developed a five-cylinder bike called the KR5. The team was originally well-funded by Proton of Malaysia, but by the middle of the 2004 season, it became apparent that the Roberts team was not able to field an engine capable of competing with the dominant Japanese factories. Roberts turned to the KTM factory to provide engines for the 2005 season. After ten races KTM abruptly withdrew their support on the eve of the Czech Republic Grand Prix, forcing the team to miss several races. Honda stepped in to help Roberts' team for the 2006 season by providing five-cylinder engines, as Roberts' son, Kenny Roberts Jr., rode the Team Roberts KR211V bike to a sixth place in the championship including two podium results. The 2007 season saw the introduction of a new MotoGP engine formula using 800 cc four-stroke engines. Roberts would once again secure engines from Honda for the Team Roberts KR212V race bike, but the results were not as hoped, and funding for the team faded. After the 2007 season, Roberts pulled out of MotoGP competition due to lack of sponsorship.

== Legacy ==
Roberts' riding style in which he forced the motorcycle's rear wheel to break traction to steer around a corner, essentially riding on paved surfaces as if they were dirt tracks, changed the way Grand Prix motorcycles were ridden. From 1983 to 1999, every 500 cc world championship was won by a rider with a dirt track racing background. Roberts' cornering method of hanging off the motorcycles with his knee extended forced him to use duct tape as knee pads, and eventually led to the introduction of purpose-built knee pucks used by all motorcycle road racers today. His battles with the Grand Prix establishment eventually led to the adoption of stricter safety standards for Grand Prix race organizers. He was one of the first riders to challenge the FIM over the way they treated competitors and helped improve prize money as well as the professionalism of the sport. It was not until Roberts planned his rival race series in 1980 that the FIM was forced to change the way in which they dealt with motorcycle racers.

Throughout his career, Roberts has been a strong proponent of raising the image of motorcycle racing among the general public. During his riding career, he made a point of returning to the United States during the mid-season break in the Grand Prix calendar to race in the Laguna Seca 200 as a way to increase the profile of the event in order for it to gain Grand Prix status. The race eventually attained Grand Prix status in 1988 and in 1993, Roberts took on the role of promoter, providing financial backing for the 1993 United States Grand Prix. In the 1990s when Grand Prix racing faced diminishing numbers of competitors due to increasing costs, Roberts demanded that Yamaha provide engines to privateer teams in order to bolster the number of racers.

Roberts' son, Kenny Roberts Jr., won the 2000 500 cc World Championship, making them the only father and son duo to have won the title. Ironically, Roberts has stated that he considers himself a dirt tracker at heart and only took up road racing because it was necessary to do so if a rider was going to compete for the Grand National championship. He also said that he would have preferred to remain in the United States to compete in the Grand National championship if Yamaha or another manufacturer had been able to construct a dirt track racer capable of competing with Harley-Davidson.

== Honors ==
- Inducted into the Motorsports Hall of Fame of America in 1990.
- Inducted into the International Motorsports Hall of Fame in 1992.
- Inducted into the AMA Motorcycle Hall of Fame in 1998.
- The FIM named him a Grand Prix "Legend" in 2000.

== Motorcycle Grand Prix results ==
| **Position** | 1 | 2 | 3 | 4 | 5 | 6 | 7 | 8 | 9 | 10 |
| **Points** | 15 | 12 | 10 | 8 | 6 | 5 | 4 | 3 | 2 | 1 |

(key) (Races in bold indicate pole position; races in italics indicate fastest lap)

| Year | Class | Team | Machine | 1 | 2 | 3 | 4 | 5 | 6 | 7 | 8 | 9 | 10 | 11 | 12 | 13 | Points | Rank | Wins |
|---|---|---|---|---|---|---|---|---|---|---|---|---|---|---|---|---|---|---|---|
| 1974 | 250 cc | Yamaha USA | TZ250 | GER - | NAT - | IOM - | **NED**; 3 | BEL - | SWE - | FIN - | CZE - | YUG - | ESP - | | | | 10 | 19th | 0 |
| 1978 | 250 cc | Yamaha USA | TZ250 | VEN; 1 | **ESP**; 2 | | FRA; 2 | **NAT**; DNS | **NED**; 1 | BEL - | SWE - | FIN - | GBR - | GER - | CZE - | YUG - | 54 | 4th | 2 |
| 1978 | 500 cc | Yamaha USA | YZR500 OW35K | VEN - | **ESP**; 2 | AUT; 1 | FRA; 1 | **NAT**; 1 | NED; 2 | BEL; 2 | SWE; 7 | FIN; DNF | GBR; 1 | GER; 3 | | | 110 | **1st** | 4 |
| 1979 | 500 cc | Yamaha USA | YZR500 OW45 | VEN - | AUT; 1 | GER; 2 | NAT; 1 | ESP; 1 | **YUG**; 1 | **NED**; 8 | BEL; DNS | **SWE**; 4 | FIN; 6 | **GBR**; 1 | **FRA**; 3 | | 113 | **1st** | 5 |
| 1980 | 500 cc | Yamaha Intl | YZR500 OW48 | NAT; 1 | **ESP**; 1 | FRA; 1 | NED; DNF | BEL; 3 | FIN; 2 | **GBR**; 2 | GER; 4 | | | | | | 87 | **1st** | 3 |
| 1981 | 500 cc | Yamaha Intl | YZR500 OW54 | AUT; DNF | GER; 1 | NAT; 1 | FRA; 5 | YUG; 3 | NED; DNS | BEL; 2 | RSM; DNS | GBR; 2 | FIN; 7 | SWE; DNF | | | 74 | **3rd** | 2 |
| 1982 | 500 cc | Yamaha Intl | YZR500 OW60 | **ARG**; 1 | | | | | | | | | | | | | 68 | 4th | 2 |
| 1982 | 500 cc | Yamaha Intl | YZR500 OW61 | | AUT; 3 | FRA; DNS | ESP; 1 | NAT; 4 | **NED**; 2 | BEL; 4 | YUG; DNS | GBR; DNF | SWE; DNS | RSM; DNS | GER; DNS | | 68 | 4th | 2 |
| 1983 | 500 cc | Marlboro Agostini Yamaha | YZR500 OW70 | RSA; 2 | **FRA**; 4 | **NAT**; DNF | GER; 1 | ESP; 2 | **AUT**; 1 | YUG; 4 | **NED**; 1 | BEL; 1 | **GBR**; 1 | SWE; 2 | **RSM**; 1 | | 142 | **2nd** | 6 |

== Sources ==
- Coleman, Barry (1982). Kenny Roberts. London: Arthur Barker Ltd. ISBN 0-213-16825-1. OCLC 11770287.

== Bibliography ==
- Coleman, Barry (January 1, 1982). Kenny Roberts. William Kimber & Co. Ltd. ISBN 978-0718304287.
- Oxley, Mat (October 1, 1998). Kenny Roberts: The World Championship Story. Haynes Publishing. ISBN 978-1859604113.
