= Kenny Roberts Jr. =

American motorcycle racer (born 1973)

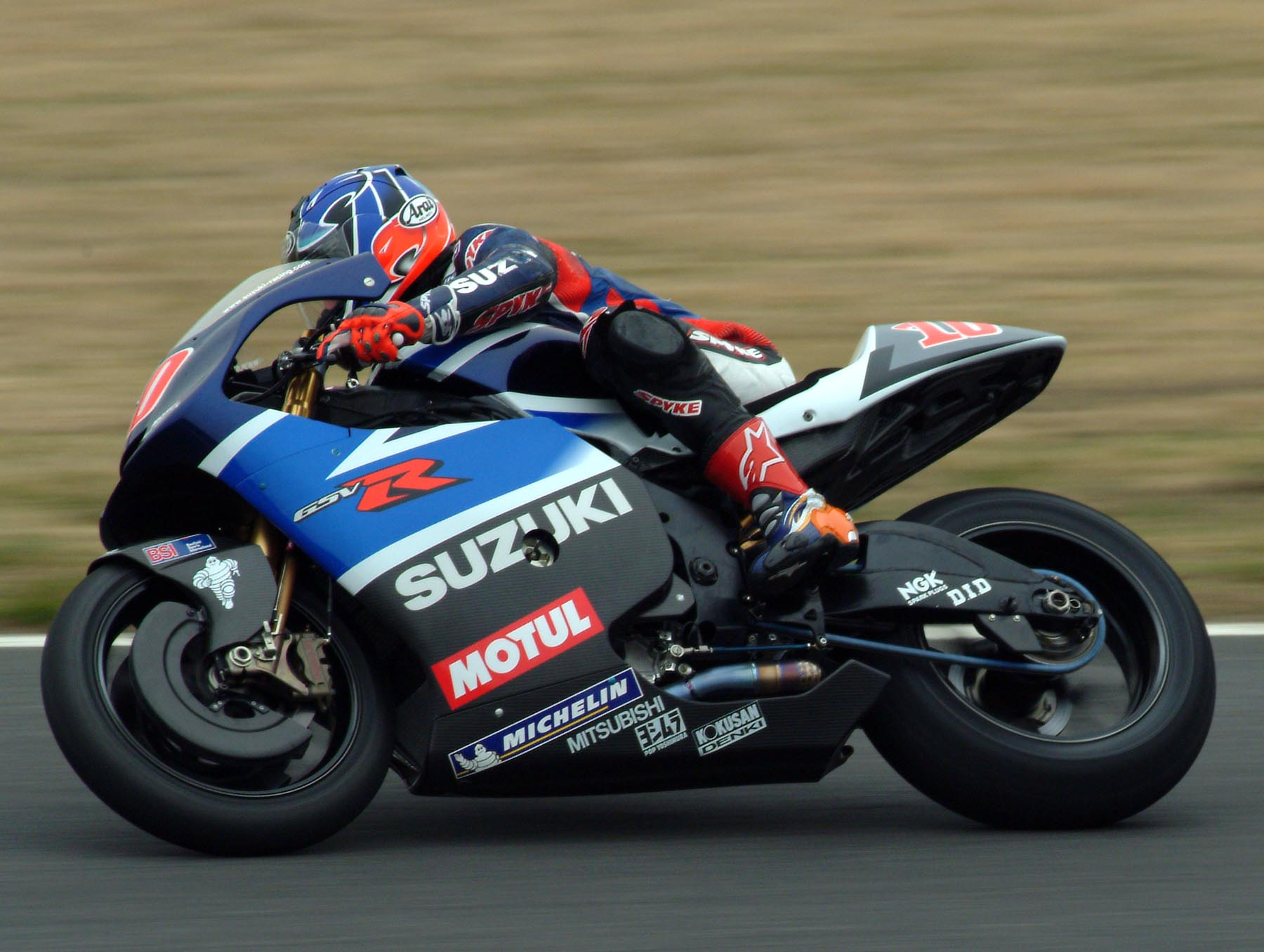
- Roberts Jr. on the Suzuki GSV-R
- Born: July 25, 1973 (age 53); Mountain View, California, U.S.
Motorcycle racing career statistics
Grand Prix motorcycle racing
Active years	1993–2007
First race	1993 250cc United States Grand Prix
Last race	2007 MotoGP Catalan Grand Prix
First win	1999 500cc Malaysian Grand Prix
Last win	2000 500cc Pacific Grand Prix
Team(s)	Yamaha, Modenas, Suzuki, KR211V, KR212V
Championships	500cc - 2000
Starts / Wins / Podiums / Poles / F. laps / Points; 185 / 8 / 22 / 10 / 9 / 1210

Kenneth Leroy Roberts Jr. (born July 25, 1973) is an American former professional Grand Prix motorcycle road racer who won the 500cc Grand Prix Motorcycle Racing Championship in 2000, after finishing runner-up in 1999. Roberts Jr. is an eight-time Premier Class race winner. He joined his father Kenny Roberts as the only father-son duo to have won 500cc World Championships. Roberts was inducted into the F.I.M. MotoGP Hall of Fame in 2017.

== Career ==
=== Early years ===
Roberts first raced in the 250cc class at Willow Springs in 1990, winning five races in his debut season in road racing. By 1993, he made his World 500cc debut at the Laguna Seca Raceway event, and was a full-time 250cc racer for 1994 and 1995 with the Marlboro-Yamaha team.

=== Team Roberts ===
Roberts moved up to 500cc World Championship racing with Yamaha in 1996. He finished his debut season in 500cc in 13th position overall and Yamaha decided not to renew his contract. He then joined his father's team in 1997, spending two years developing their Modenas two-stroke bike. In those two years, he struggled to get into the top position, finishing 16th and 13th respectively in 1997 and 1998.

=== Suzuki years ===
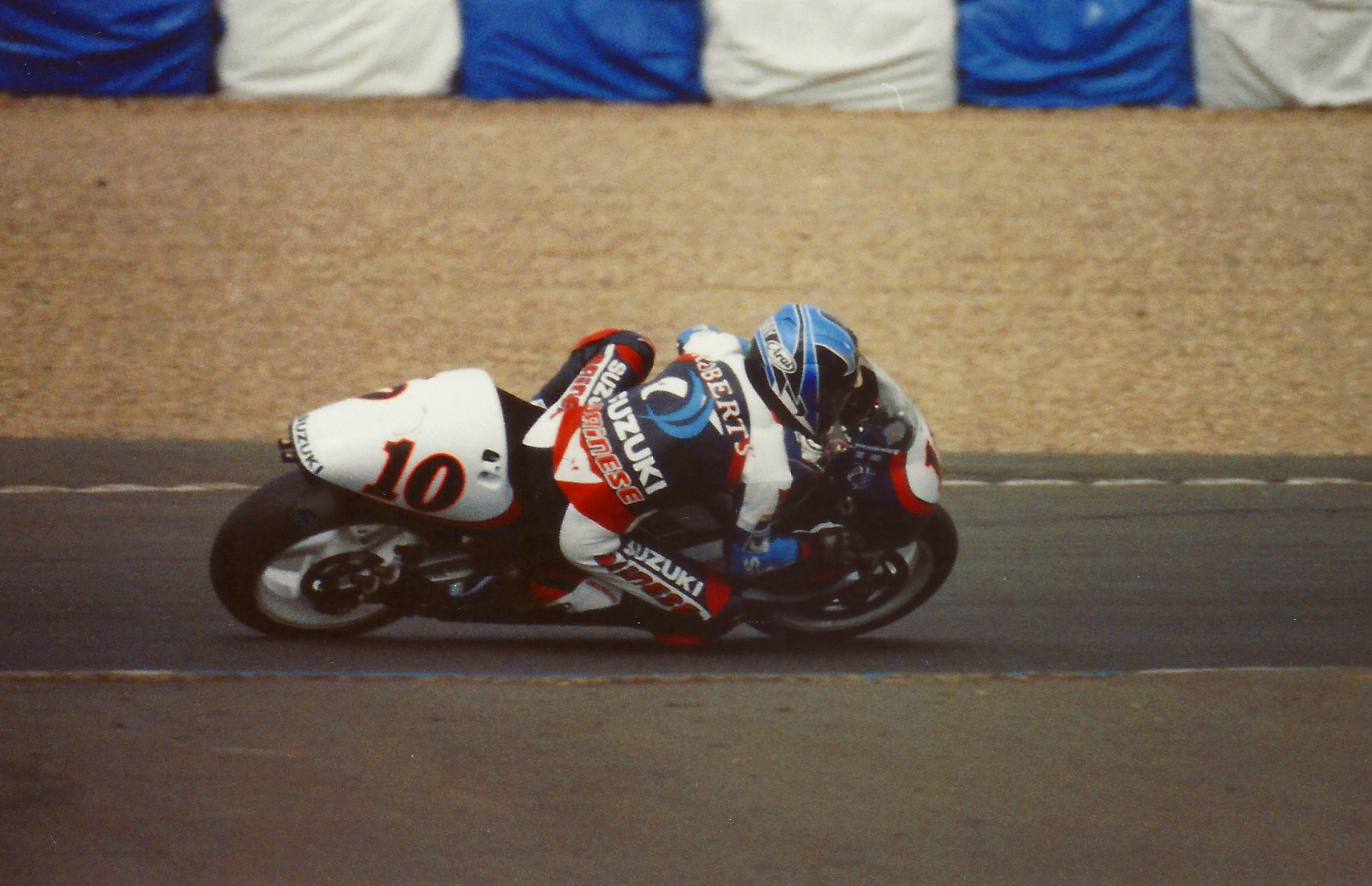
Kenny Roberts Jr. (pictured at Donington Park) riding the Suzuki RGV500 in 1999.

In 1999, Suzuki signed Roberts to their Grand Prix team. His debut race with Suzuki in Malaysia resulted in a surprise win, defeating the reigning champion, Mick Doohan. He went on to win the second race in Japan, where he again defeated Doohan. This winning streak put him as a strong contender to challenge Doohan for the championship. However, Doohan retired due to injuries suffered in an accident on the third race in Spain. Afterwards, the main challenge for the championship came from Doohan's teammate, Àlex Crivillé. Roberts failed to find consistency during the rest of the season, notching only two more wins and another four podiums. His lead in the championship subsequently was taken over by Crivillé, who later went on to win the title. Roberts would finish a respectable second in the championship.

Roberts renewed his championship challenge in 2000. With Crivillé failing to regain his form, Roberts' main challenge came from Valentino Rossi, a rookie rider fresh from winning the 250cc title. This time, Roberts managed to find consistency by taking four wins and five podiums in 16 races. Roberts clinched his first title, two races before the end of the season, at the Rio Grand Prix after finishing sixth. He became the first son of a former champion to also win the title. His victory also meant Suzuki broke Honda's six-year championship win streak.

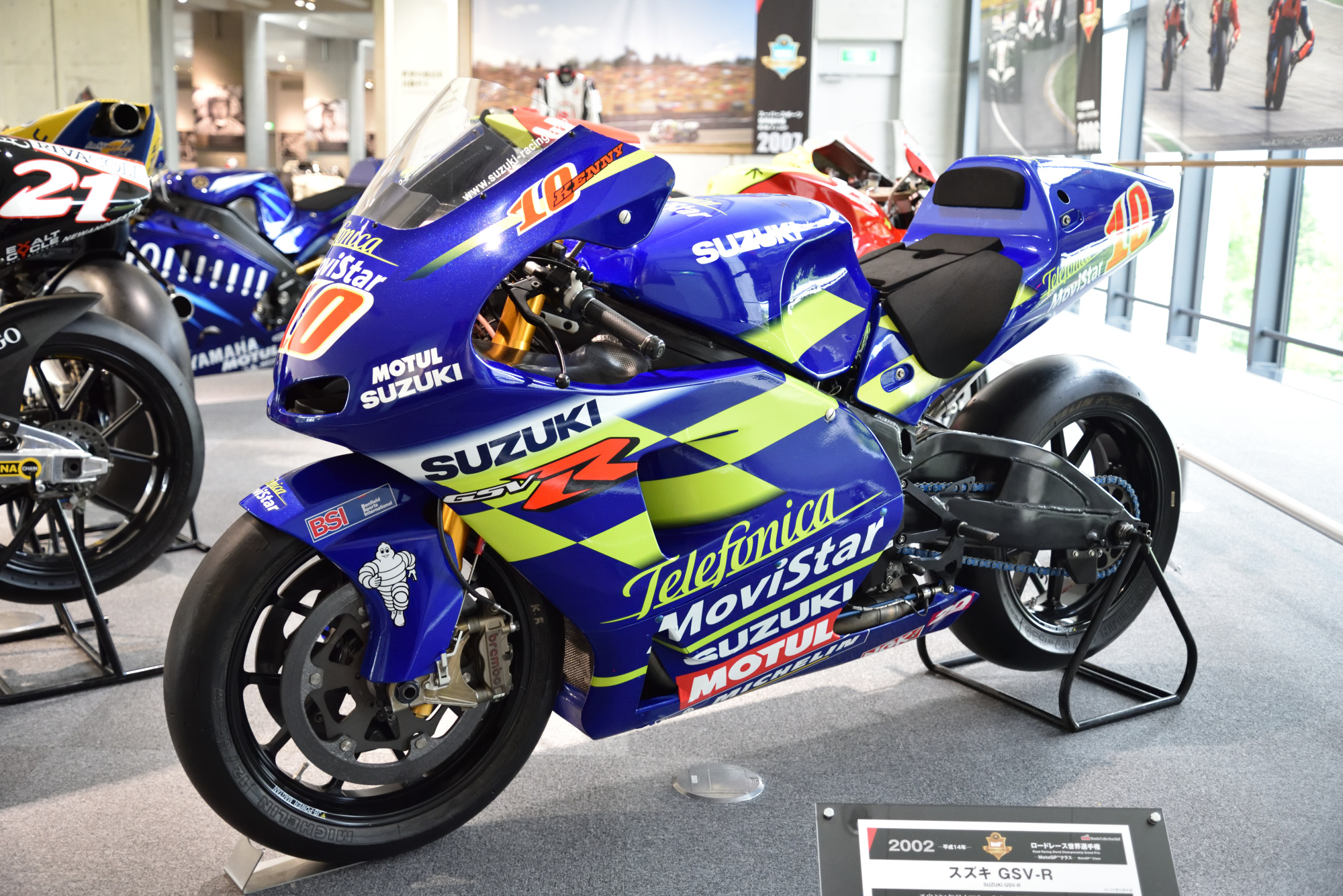
Suzuki GSV-R, 2002.

In 2001, Roberts and Suzuki faced a tough task to defend the title. With Rossi dominating the series to win the title, Roberts only managed a single podium and finished the season in disappointing 11th position. This also marked the end of the two-stroke 500cc bike era as the regulations changed for 2002.

Between 2002 and 2005, Roberts faced a difficult time in developing the new four-stroke 990cc Suzuki GSV-R bike to challenge Honda and Yamaha. He was also being challenged by his younger teammate, John Hopkins, who often outperformed him. Even in 2003 and 2004, Hopkins managed to finish the season ahead of Roberts. During the four-year period, Roberts managed to gain only two podiums, one in 2002 and one in 2005. At the end of 2005, Suzuki decided not to renew Roberts' contract and opted for a younger rider in Chris Vermeulen.

=== Return to Team Roberts ===
Roberts returned to his father's team in 2006. Honda provided the RC211V V5 engine with the frame being designed by Team Roberts and the bike subsequently named KR211V. He took his first podium of the season at Catalunya, having started on the front row.

A run of five successive top-five grid positions in mid-season showed the bike's promise. Roberts again finished third at Estoril, having led with one lap to go. He later explained that he had miscounted the number of laps, and when he came onto the final straight with one lap to go, he expected to see the chequered flag, and that this distracted him and prevented him blocking Toni Elías' passing move. With these two podium finishes, he finished sixth in the standings at the end of the year, aided by riders such as Casey Stoner and Sete Gibernau missing races. This was Roberts' best result since winning the championship in 2000 and the team's best result in the riders' standings since they started developing their own bikes.

Roberts remained on his father's team at the start of 2007. However, 2007 marked a new era as 990cc bike were replaced with an 800cc displacement formula. He rode the KR212V bike which are using the RC212V's V4 engine supplied by Honda. The 2007 season was less successful, due to Honda concentrating on improving the underperforming Repsol Honda factory machine. After only four points in the first part of the season, Kenny Jr. stopped racing midseason, replaced by his brother Kurtis, and never returned in 2007. Both Kenny and the entire team did not participate in 2008 season.

== Career statistics ==
=== Grand Prix motorcycle racing ===
==== By season ====
Season	Class	Motorcycle	Team	Number	Race	Win	Podium	Pole	FLap	Pts	Plcd	WCh
1993	250cc	Yamaha TZM250	Team Roberts	75	1	0	0	0	0	6	27th	–
1994	250cc	Yamaha TZM250	Team Roberts	25	4	0	0	0	0	23	18th	–
1995	250cc	Yamaha TZM250	Team Roberts	25	13	0	0	0	0	82	8th	–
1996	500cc	Yamaha YZR500	Marlboro Team Roberts	10	13	0	0	0	0	69	13th	–
1997	500cc	Modenas KR3	Marlboro Team Roberts	10	15	0	0	0	0	37	16th	–
1998	500cc	Modenas KR3	Team Roberts	10	13	0	0	0	0	59	13th	–
1999	500cc	Suzuki RGV500	Suzuki Grand Prix Team	10	16	4	8	5	5	220	2nd	–
2000	500cc	Suzuki RGV500	Telefónica Movistar Suzuki	2	16	4	9	4	3	258	1st	1
2001	500cc	Suzuki RGV500	Telefónica Movistar Suzuki	1	16	0	1	0	0	97	11th	–
2002	MotoGP	Suzuki GSV-R	Telefónica Movistar Suzuki	10	15	0	1	0	0	99	9th	–
2003	MotoGP	Suzuki GSV-R	Suzuki Grand Prix Team	10	13	0	0	0	0	22	19th	–
2004	MotoGP	Suzuki GSV-R	Team Suzuki MotoGP	10	12	0	0	1	0	37	18th	–
2005	MotoGP	Suzuki GSV-R	Team Suzuki MotoGP	10	14	0	1	0	0	63	13th	–
2006	MotoGP	KR211V	Team Roberts	10	17	0	2	0	1	134	6th	–
2007	MotoGP	KR212V	Team Roberts	10	7	0	0	0	0	4	24th	–
Total					**185**	**8**	**22**	**10**	**9**	**1210**		**1**

==== Races by year ====
(key) (Races in bold indicate pole position, races in italics indicate fastest lap)

Year	Class	Bike	1	2	3	4	5	6	7	8	9	10	11	12	13	14	15	16	17	18	Pos	Pts
1993	250cc	Yamaha	AUS	MAL	JPN	SPA	AUT	GER	NED	EUR	RSM	GBR	CZE	ITA	USA; 10	FIM					27th	6
1994	250cc	Yamaha	AUS	MAL	JPN	SPA	AUT	GER	NED	ITA	FRA	GBR	CZE; Ret	USA; 8	ARG; 6	EUR; 11					18th	23
1995	250cc	Yamaha	AUS; 7	MAL; 9	JPN; Ret	SPA; Ret	GER; 4	ITA; 6	NED; 5	FRA; 6	GBR; Ret	CZE; 8	BRA; 13	ARG; Ret	EUR; 5						8th	82
1996	500cc	Yamaha	MAL	INA	JPN; 12	SPA; 6	ITA; 10	FRA; Ret	NED; 5	GER; 5	GBR; Ret	AUT; Ret	CZE; 4	IMO; 10	CAT; Ret	BRA; 13	AUS; 11				13th	69
1997	500cc	Modenas	MAL; Ret	JPN; Ret	SPA; 18	ITA; Ret	AUT; Ret	FRA; Ret	NED; 8	IMO; 17	GER; Ret	BRA; Ret	GBR; 11	CZE; 9	CAT; 8	INA; 9	AUS; 14				16th	37
1998	500cc	Modenas	JPN; 11	MAL; 11	SPA; 9	ITA; Ret	FRA; 13	MAD; DNQ	NED; 9	GBR; Ret	GER; 6	CZE; 10	IMO; 14	CAT; 10	AUS; 10	ARG; 11					13th	59
1999	500cc	Suzuki	MAL; 1	**JPN**; 1	SPA; 13	FRA; Ret	ITA; 5	CAT; 6	NED; 2	GBR; 8	**GER**; 1	CZE; 3	IMO; 6	VAL; 2	**AUS**; 10	RSA; 22	**BRA**; 3	**ARG**; 1			**2nd**	**220**
2000	500cc	Suzuki	RSA; 6	**MAL**; 1	**JPN**; 2	SPA; 1	FRA; 6	ITA; 6	CAT; 1	NED; Ret	GBR; 2	**GER**; 3	CZE; 4	POR; 2	**VAL**; 2	BRA; 6	PAC; 1	AUS; 7			**1st**	**258**
2001	500cc	Suzuki	JPN; 7	RSA; 7	SPA; 7	FRA; 6	ITA; Ret	CAT; Ret	NED; 6	GBR; 8	GER; 9	CZE; Ret	POR; 6	VAL; 3	PAC; 8	AUS; 15	MAL; Ret	BRA; 16			11th	97
2002	MotoGP	Suzuki	JPN; Ret	RSA; Ret	SPA; 8	FRA; 5	ITA; Ret	CAT; 7	NED; 6	GBR; 14	GER	CZE; 11	POR; 4	BRA; 3	PAC; 6	MAL; 8	AUS; 9	VAL; Ret			9th	99
2003	MotoGP	Suzuki	JPN; 14	RSA; 15	SPA; 13	FRA; 16	ITA; Ret	CAT	NED	GBR	GER; 15	CZE; 20	POR; 17	BRA; 17	PAC; 15	MAL; 14	AUS; 9	VAL; 11			19th	22
2004	MotoGP	Suzuki	RSA; Ret	SPA; 8	FRA; 12	ITA; Ret	CAT; 17	NED; 16	**BRA**; 7	GER; 8	GBR; 17	CZE; 10	POR; 14	JPN; Ret	QAT	MAL	AUS	VAL			18th	37
2005	MotoGP	Suzuki	SPA; Ret	POR; 12	CHN; Ret	FRA; 13	ITA; 15	CAT; 15	NED; 16	USA; 14	GBR; 2	GER; 11	CZE; 11	JPN; 8	MAL; 7	QAT; 11	AUS; WD	TUR	VAL		13th	63
2006	MotoGP	KR211V	SPA; 8	QAT; 10	TUR; 13	CHN; 13	FRA; Ret	ITA; 8	CAT; 3	NED; 5	GBR; 5	GER; Ret	USA; 4	CZE; 4	MAL; 7	AUS; 14	JPN; 9	POR; 3	VAL; 8		6th	134
2007	MotoGP	KR212V	QAT; 13	SPA; 16	TUR; 16	CHN; 15	FRA; Ret	ITA; 17	CAT; 16	GBR	NED	GER	USA	CZE	RSM	POR	JPN	AUS	MAL	VAL	24th	4
