= Chilton Company =

Former American publishing company

Chilton
- Parent company: Cengage
- Founded: 1904
- Founder: George Buzby, C. A. Musselman, and James Artman
- Country of origin: United States
- Headquarters location: Boston, Massachusetts
- Publication types: Books, databases
- Nonfiction topics: Automotive, film reviews

Chilton Company (also known as Chilton Printing Co., Chilton Publishing Co., Chilton Book Co. and Chilton Research Services) is an American former publishing company, most famous for its trade magazines and automotive manuals. It also provided conference and market research services to a wide variety of industries. Chilton grew from a small publisher of a single magazine to a leading publisher of business-to-business magazines, consumer and professional automotive manuals, craft and hobby books, and a large, well-known marketing research company.

In the early years, its flagship magazine was Iron Age. In 1955, Chilton's profit reached $1 million for the first time, of which Iron Age accounted for $750,000. By 1980, Iron Age's revenue and status had declined due to the reduction in the size of the US metalworking manufacturing industry, and Jewelers' Circular-Keystone captured the position of Chilton's most profitable magazine. While Chilton had leading magazines in several different industries, the Chilton name is most strongly associated with the consumer and professional automotive manuals, which Cengage continues to license or publish.

== History ==
The company's origins go back to July 1896, and the first issue of Cycle Trade Journal, edited by James Artman who became the first president of the future Chilton Company. In 1899, the magazine changed its name to Cycle & Automobile Trade Journal. A 1900 magazine masthead listed Musselman & Buzby as the exclusive advertising representatives for Cycle & Automobile Trade Journal. In 1900, George Buzby, C. A. Musselman, and James Artman merged their companies to form the Trade Advertising & Publishing Co. The new company expanded into automotive catalogs, booklets, circulars, and posters.

The company selected the name Chilton from the Mayflower's passenger list. The earliest known use of the corporate name Chilton Company was in 1904. It appears on a corporate seal that reads "Chilton Company of Pennsylvania, incorporated March 31, 1904." In 1907, the three partners purchased a printing company that they renamed the Chilton Printing Company, only publicly adopting the name Chilton Company in 1910.

In March 1911, Chilton published the first issue of Commercial Car Journal. In February 1912, they renamed the original Cycle & Automobile Trade Journal to Automobile Trade Journal, and eventually merged it into Motor Age magazine.

In 1923, the partners sold Chilton to United Publishers Corp of New York for $1,635,000, and Artman and Buzby retired. In the same year, Chilton opened a new printing plant at 56th and Chestnut Streets in Philadelphia. This location became the Chilton Company corporate headquarters in the late 1940s.

Shortly after the purchase, United Publishers merged their Class Journal subsidiary and Chilton into what became known as the Chilton Class Journal Co, with C. A. Musselman as its president. This merger brought several future flagship magazines (such as Iron Age, Motor Age, Dry Goods Economist, Jewelers Circular, Hardware Age, and Automotive Industries) into the Chilton stable of magazines.

In 1934, the company underwent a complete reorganization. J. Howard Pew provided an infusion of cash that saved the company from bankruptcy, in exchange for a majority of the stock. All subsidiaries merged into one company and incorporated in the state of Delaware as Chilton Company. While the cash infusion from J. Howard Pew saved the company, it became the single biggest inhibitor to its growth, as Pew did not permit Chilton to seek outside funding for acquisitions. As a result, Chilton Company's growth over the next thirty years lagged behind competitors like McGraw Hill and Penton.

George Buzby's son G. C. (Carroll) Buzby became president of Chilton in the early 1950s and remained the Chief Executive Officer until he retired in the late 1960s. George C. Buzby died of cancer in 1970. In 1972, Philadelphia native William A. Barbour was elected president of Chilton.

In 1979, the American Broadcasting Company purchased the Chilton Company and made it an operating unit of ABC Publishing. ABC already owned Farm Progress, owner of the collectibles publisher Wallace-Homestead. Wallace-Homestead later became a division of Chilton. In 1985, Capital Cities purchased ABC, and in 1996, the Walt Disney Company purchased Capital Cities/ABC. Over-extended financially by its acquisition of Capital Cities ABC, Disney had to sell assets to reduce its debt—and Chilton, despite its status and recognition as an excellent business-to-business magazine publisher, was not considered a core business. Disney therefore decided to split up and sell the Chilton Company profit centers to multiple buyers:

- Krause Publications purchased the Chilton non-automotive book titles
- Reed Elsevier purchased the Chilton building and the magazine, trade show, and research division for $444 million in 1997. The research division was sold on to Taylor Nelson AGB in 1998.
- The Hearst Corporation purchased the Chilton professional automotive assets. In December 1999, a court injunction, effective for three years, divided those assets and rights between Hearst and Nichols Publishing.
- Nichols Publishing purchased the Chilton consumer automotive group assets and brand.

In 2001, Nichols sold the do-it-yourself automotive print manuals to Haynes Publishing Group (publishers of Haynes Manuals), while retaining licensing rights to the Chilton do-it-yourself brand for print products for 10 years.

In 2003, Nichols sold the remaining automotive assets to Thomson Learning. In 2007, Thomson Learning became Cengage Learning. In 2011, Cengage Learning became owner of the Chilton brand for do-it-yourself print manuals as well. Cengage continues to publish or license the professional and consumer automotive products and assets.

== Offices ==
After acquisition by United Publishers in 1923, the corporate office moved to New York City. In 1955, all former United Publishers magazines and their staffs relocated from New York City to the corporate headquarters at 56th and Chestnut Streets in Philadelphia. In 1968, Chilton moved their corporate offices to Decker Square in Bala Cynwyd, Pennsylvania. This served as temporary headquarters until 1972 when Chilton moved into its new corporate headquarters building in Radnor, Pennsylvania.

== Automobile repair manuals ==
Chilton currently publishes hundreds of automobile repair manuals that cover thousands of models. Here are some of the manufacturers covered in the Chilton do-it-yourself library:

- Acura
- Alfa Romeo
- American Motors
- Audi
- Austin
- BMW
- Buick
- Cadillac
- Chevrolet
- Chrysler
- DeSoto
- Dodge
- Fiat
- Ford
- Frazer
- Geo
- GMC
- Honda
- Hyundai
- Infiniti
- International
- Jaguar
- Jeep
- Kaiser
- Kia
- Lexus
- Lincoln
- Mazda
- Mini
- Mitsubishi
- Mercedes-Benz
- Mercury
- MG
- Nash
- Nissan
- Oldsmobile
- Opel
- Peugeot
- Plymouth
- Pontiac
- Porsche
- Renault
- Saab
- Saturn
- Scion
- Studebaker
- Subaru
- Toyota
- Triumph
- Volkswagen
- Volvo

== Fiction publishing ==
After many years of publishing business-to-business magazines and automotive manuals, Chilton acquired the trade publisher Greenberg: Publisher in 1958. Chilton published the celebrated science fiction novels Dune by Frank Herbert (1965), and The Witches of Karres (1966) by James H. Schmitz. Each was nominated for a Hugo Award for Best Novel in its respective year, and Dune won the award.

== Discontinuation ==
As of January 7, 2022 Chilton has discontinued sales of ChiltonDIY, and will not be making any further updates to the application. Chilton, like its main competitor Haynes, has reduced the availability of its product greatly. Haynes is now the sole provider of widely distributed repair manuals in the USA, and it, too, openly plans to stop selling any new paperback or digital books after 2020. Chilton still sells paperback books but plans to discontinue in the near future as well.

== See also ==
- Clymer repair manual
- Haynes Manuals
