= Team Roberts KR211V =

- Manufacturer: Team Roberts
- Production: 2006
- Predecessor: Team Roberts Proton KR5
- Successor: Team Roberts KR212V
- Class: MotoGP
- Engine: Honda
- Related: Honda RC211V

Team Roberts KR211V was a racing motorcycle developed by Kenny Roberts' MotoGP team, Team Roberts, and uses the 990cc V5 engine from the Honda RC211V bike. It was created to compete in the 2006 MotoGP series and was piloted by Kenny Roberts, Jr., eldest son of Kenny Roberts.

== KR211V results ==
(key) (results in bold indicate pole position; results in italics indicate fastest lap)

Year	Entrant	Tyres	Rider	No.	1	2	3	4	5	6	7	8	9	10	11	12	13	14	15	16	17	Points	RC
2006					ESP	QAT	TUR	CHN	FRA	ITA	CAT	NED	GBR	GER	USA	CZE	MAL	AUS	JPN	POR	VAL		
2006	Team Roberts	**MI**	Kenny Roberts, Jr.	10	8	10	13	13	Ret	8	3	5	5	Ret	4	4	7	14	9	3	8	134	6th
