= Münch (motorcycles) =

Münch Mammut 4 1200 TTS
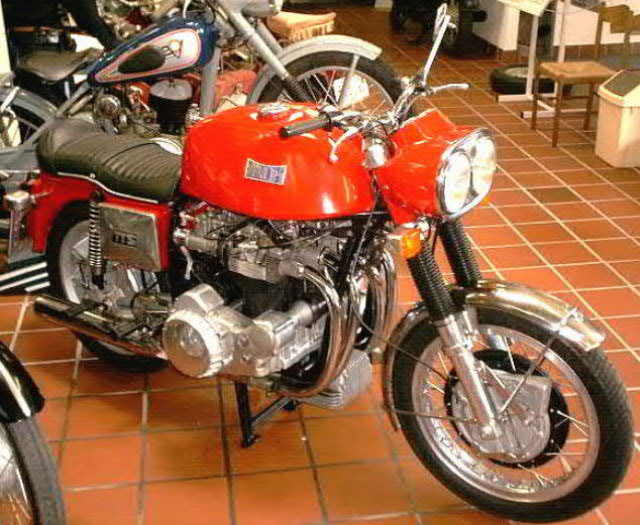
- The Münch Mammut 1200 carburetor model with 10 in (250 mm) front drum brake
- Also called: Mammut (German), Münch 4 1200
- Production: 1966–1975
- Predecessor: Münch-4 TTS 1100
- Successor: 4 1200 TTS-E
- Class: Sport touring
- Engine: 1,177 cc (71.8 cu in), inline transverse four cylinder SOHC with two twin-choke Weber carburetors
- Bore / stroke: 75 mm × 66.6 mm (2.95 in × 2.62 in)
- Top speed: 137 mph (220 km/h)
- Power: 88 bhp (66 kW) @ 6,000 rpm
- Ignition type: Battery and coil, Bosch 400 watt, 6 volt generator
- Transmission: Gear primary-drive to four speed gearbox with wet multiplate clutch, enclosed-chain final drive
- Frame type: Twin loop cradle
- Suspension: Telescopic front forks and rear swinging arm
- Brakes: 10 in (250 mm) front drum, rear drum
- Weight: 656 lb (298 kg) (wet)

Münch was a German motorcycle manufacturer which, during the 1960s, produced the Mammut, a four-cylinder motorcycle using an NSU car engine.

Hugo Wilson wrote of the founder Friedel Münch:

Münch produced many prototype and racing machines, but the Mammoth is his most famous motorcycle – it was simply the fastest, most powerful, most expensive bike of its time.

Limited production began in 1966. The 'Mammut' name was never used officially as the "Maschinenfabrik Berner & Co" owned the copyright to the name after having used it in the interwar years. Münch's motorcycles were sold as "Münch TT" instead.

== Early history ==
Friedel Münch began his career as a mechanic and engine tuner in the late 1940s, working especially with Horex motorcycles. The Horex factory noted the success of his home-tuned racers, and offered Münch a job in their competition department.

When Horex ceased motorcycle manufacture in 1956, Friedel Münch purchased the remaining stocks of motorcycles and spares, and sold his own race-tuned Horex cafe racers from his workshop in Altenstadt, Germany.

== Early Mammuts ==
Machines were hand-built to order from Münch's workshop in Nieder-Florstadt, Friedberg, West Germany.

Friedl Münch was given a commission in 1966 to build a special for Jean Murit, a famous French former sidecar road-racer, who was then-President of the BMW Club of France and organiser of the Chamois Rally, a summertime motorcyclists' gathering at high altitude in the Alps.

Münch used a 996 cc air-cooled NSU Motorenwerke engine having a chain-driven single overhead camshaft housed in a specially-built, brazed-up steel tube frame based on Norton Featherbed principles. Customers could choose from one, two or four carburetors, with options for 43 or 52 bhp. A four-speed gearbox connected to a gear primary-drive and enclosed-chain final drive, and the front brake was one of Münch's famous 10 in (250 mm) units.

In July 1966, Murit rode his new bike at the head of a procession from the Val d’Isère up to Col de l'Iseran, Europe's second-highest mountain pass.

== Production ==
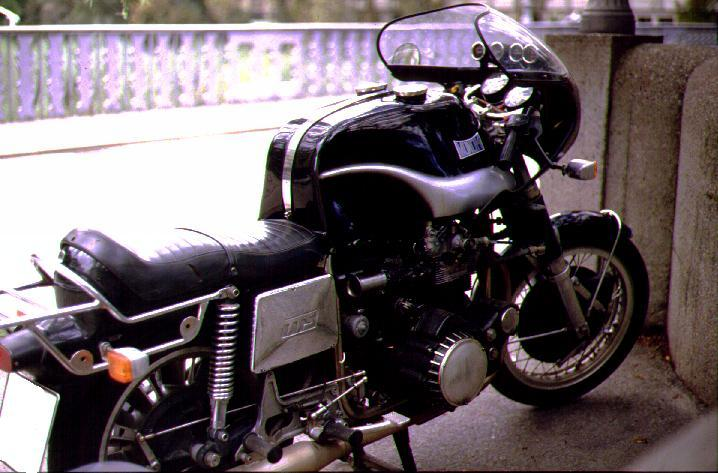
Münch 1200 TTS-E right side

In 1966 he created the Mammut, installing an NSU 996 cc overhead camshaft, 4 cylinder automobile engine with 55 hp into a tubular loop frame of his own construction. The machine weighed a reasonable 480 lbs, with a maximum speed of 115 mph – good for the era. The front brake was a massive 10 in (250 mm) magnesium casting.

In 1968, Münch used the new 1177 cc NSU TTS car engine for a revised machine, which he called the Münch4 1200TTS. The new engine gave 88 hp, and the machine was prone to break the heavy-duty spokes on the rear wheel, so Münch developed a unique and much stronger cast magnesium rear wheel, while retaining a spoked wire wheel up front. The fuel tank and side panels were made of hand-hammered aluminum, while the seat, headlamp binnacle, wheels and brakes were magnesium. Despite the extensive use of lightweight materials, the Mammut weighed 650 lbs. American motorcycle entrepreneur Floyd Clymer invested in the Münch brand from 1968, marketing the bike in US as Clymer-Münch Mammoth IV with the slogan "Built up to a standard, not down to a price". Clymer died before serious production could commence.

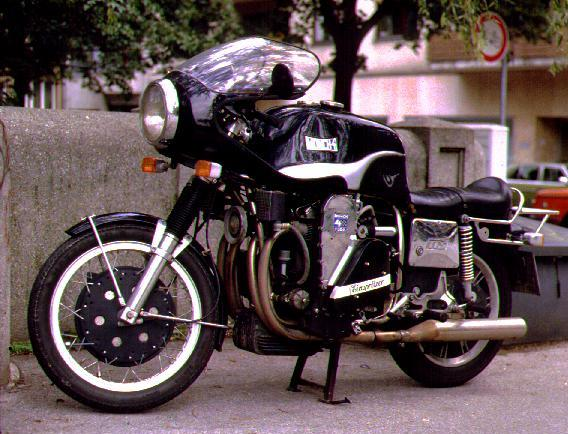
Münch 1200 TTS-E left side

The Münch, being a hand-built machine, was always expensive, and in 1969 sold for $3,995, while the BMW R69S sold for $1,695. Built to order after a $1,000 initial payment, the total price included duty, excise tax and air freight to any location in the United States.

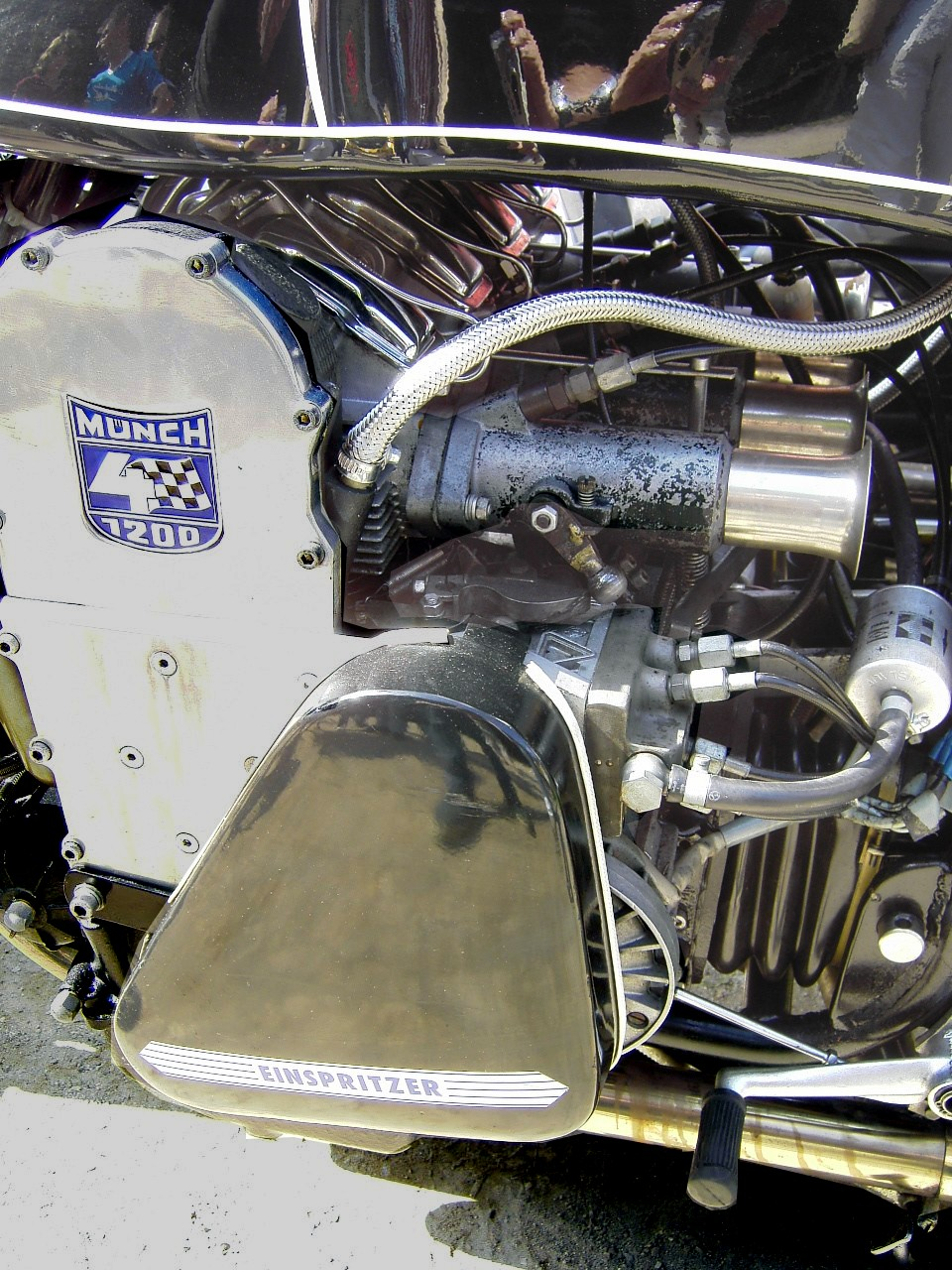
1200 TTS-E Einspritzer showing belt-driven Kugelfischer fuel injection pump with injectors fitted into manifold

The 1200TTS model was originally fitted with a pair of Weber 40DCOE carburetors, but by 1973 Kugelfischer mechanical fuel injection was available (designated Model 1200 TTS-E – Einspritzer – the German word for injection), which gave 100 hp.

It is estimated less than 500 machines were produced.

Notable Münch owners in the USA include Jay Leno and the late Malcolm Forbes (two, one of which he gave to Elizabeth Taylor). The 2010 French film Mammuth follows Gérard Depardieu's character Serge Pilardosse on a journey through his past, riding a Münch "Mammut" 1200 TTS. George Barber owned a 1972 Munch Mammut TTS which is on display at Barber Motorsports Museum in Leeds, Alabama.

== See also ==
- List of motorcycles by type of engine
