= Haynes Motor Museum =

Transport museum in Somerset, England

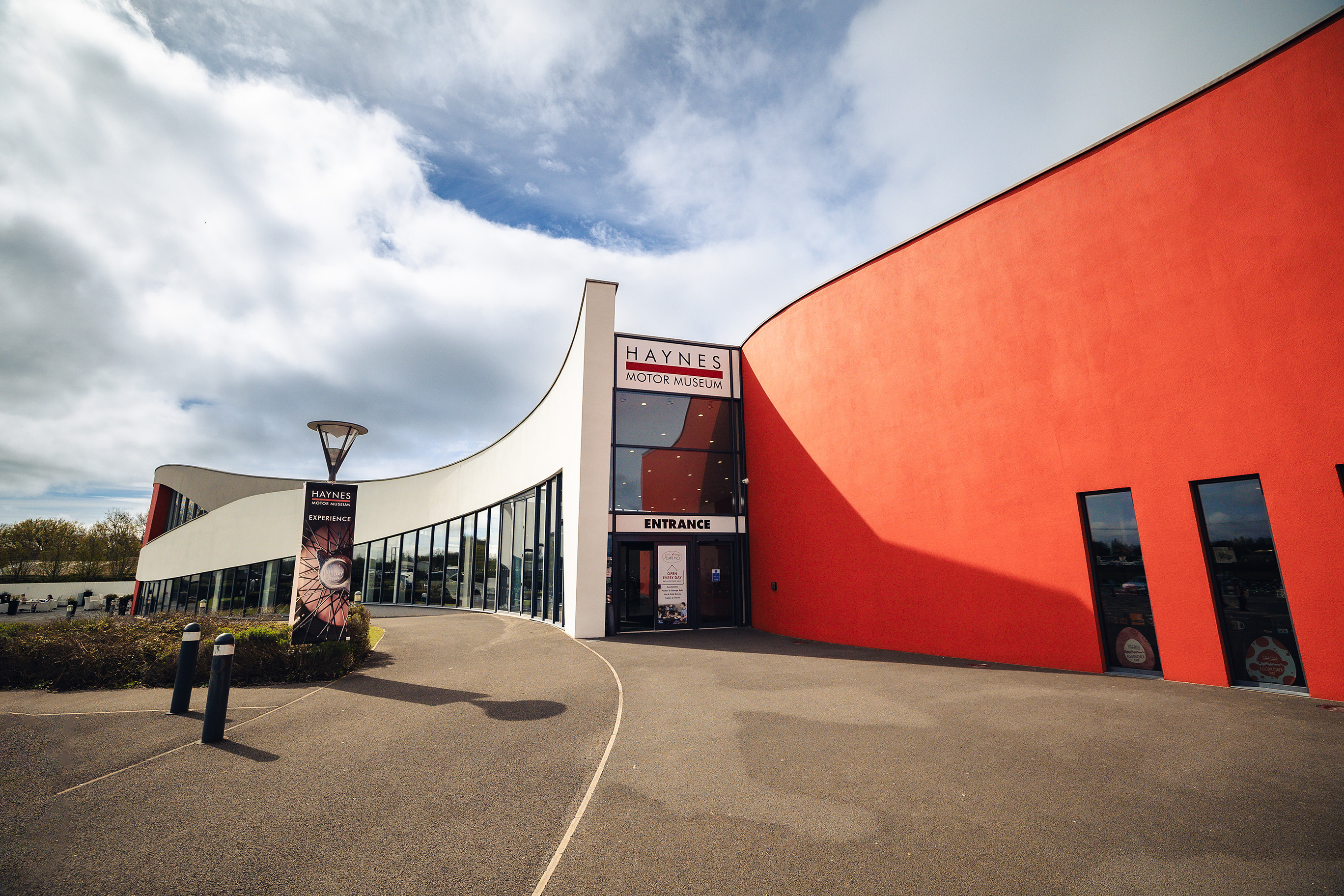
- Main building of the Haynes Motor Museum

- Location in Somerset and England
- Established: 1985; 41 years ago
- Location: Sparkford, Somerset
- Coordinates: 51.0410°N 2.5592°W
- CEO: Chris Scudds
- Website: www.haynesmuseum.org

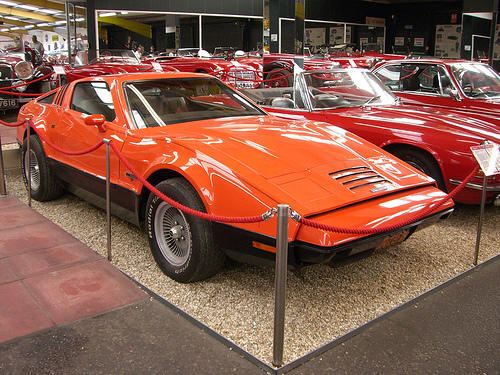
A rare Canadian-built Bricklin held in the collection

Haynes Motor Museum at Sparkford near Yeovil in Somerset, England, contains over 300 cars and motorcycles and a collection of other automobilia.

The museum was established in 1985 by John Harold Haynes OBE (1938–2019), founder of Haynes Owner's Workshop Manuals (commonly known as Haynes Manuals). It is a registered charity under English law.

== History ==
In 1984, John Haynes purchased a disused sawmill in Sparkford, where he established the museum in July 1985 with an initial collection of 35 cars.

Between 2012 and 2014, the Haynes Motor Museum underwent a major redevelopment, including extensions and refurbishment works designed to modernise the site and expand its facilities.

The redevelopment introduced a new entrance foyer, shop, café, offices and conference suites, along with additional exhibition halls to accommodate the growing collection. The redevelopment also introduced new themed exhibition spaces and interactive elements.

Architecturally, the project created a new external façade which includes a sweeping white and red frontage and a black-clad exhibition structure.

John Haynes died on 8 February 2019, aged 80.

== Exhibitions ==
The museum is divided into fifteen exhibitions:

- British Icons: Driven by Innovation reveals the untold stories of the people who designed, built and advanced some of the most iconic British cars in history.
- John Haynes: The Man and The Manuals delves into the story of the Museum's founder, John H Haynes OBE
- The Red Room, contains red sports cars from around the world, including a 1981 Lamborghini Countach and a 1959 Austin-Healey Sprite.
- The Dawn of Motoring includes exhibits dating from 1886 including a replica 1886 Benz Patent Motorwagen.
- Veteran and Vintage includes 1903 Darracq Type L and a 1922 Rover 8 hp.
- Travelling in Style includes a 2007 Bentley Continental GT and a 1957 Bentley Series 1.
- Memory Lane contains a 1965 Ford Cortina Mk1 and a 1950 Rover 75.
- The Morris Story includes a 1917 Morris Cowley and a 1955 Morris Minor Convertible.
- Ferrari: The Man & The Machine contains a 2000 Ferrari 360 F1 and a 1980 Ferrari 512 Berlinetta Boxer.
- Hall of Motorsport depicts varied disciplines of motorsport including a 1996 Ferrari Formula 1 Type F310 (DC) and 1950 Healey Silverstone.
- The American Dream includes in pride of place a 1931 Duesenberg J Derham bodied Tourster, one of only eight built.
- Life on Two Wheels explores the history of British motorcycling over the past 150 years.
- Williams F1: The Drivers and The Driven includes an FW14.
- Wheels around the World includes a 1975 Bricklin SVI and a 1967 Citroen DS.
- Transitions explores the prospect of sustainable motoring, includes a Yr Glanaf wooden concept car.

== Vehicles in the Collection ==
This is not an exhaustive list — a complete list is provided on the museum's website.

- 1931 Duesenberg Model J
- 1981 Lamborghini Countach LP400S
- 1993 Jaguar XJ220
- 1964 AC Cobra, one of just 45 right hand drive models
- 1981 DeLorean DMC-12
- 1937 Brough Superior SS80
- 1915 Horstmann
- 1923 Francis-Barnett Model 3
- 2016 Williams FW38
- 1960 Ferrari 250 GT Cabriolet
- 1969 Dodge Charger
- 1932 MG Magnette K3, rebuilt in the style of a K3 in 1992
- 1991 Williams FW14
- 1982 Aston Martin Lagonda
- 1921 Ford Model T
- 1965 Jaguar E Type FHC 4.2 S1
- 1973 Porsche 911 RS Carrera 2.1 Touring
- 1977 Rover 3500 Estate
- 1952 Aston Martion DB2
- 1965 Austin Mini Super Deluxe
- 1981 Ferrari 308 GTSi Targa
- 1967 Citroën DS19A
- 1972 De Tomaso Pantera
- 1959 Cadillac Sedan DeVille
- 1963 Chevrolet Corvette Stingray

== In popular culture ==
The museum featured in an episode of the police drama McDonald & Dodds titled A Billion Beats as the headquarters of fictitious Formula 1 team Addingtons which included scenes shot in The Red Room.

The museum featured in Susan Calman's Grand Day Out The Legends of King Arthur episode which aired on Channel 5 on Friday 31 October.
