= Team Roberts KR212V =

- Manufacturer: Team Roberts
- Production: 2007
- Predecessor: Team Roberts KR211V
- Class: MotoGP
- Engine: Honda
- Related: Honda RC212V

The KR212V is a racing motorcycle developed by Kenny Roberts' MotoGP team, Team Roberts, and uses the customer 800 cc V4 engine from the Honda RC212V bike. It replaces the KR211V from 2006 to compete in the 2007 MotoGP series and was to be piloted by Kenny Roberts, Jr., who effectively retired halfway through that season. The rest of the 2007 season was completed by his brother Kurtis Roberts.

== KR212V results ==
(key) (results in bold indicate pole position; results in italics indicate fastest lap)

Year	Entrant	Tyres	Rider	No.	1	2	3	4	5	6	7	8	9	10	11	12	13	14	15	16	17	18	Points	RC
2007					QAT	ESP	TUR	CHN	FRA	ITA	CAT	GBR	NED	GER	USA	CZE	RSM	POR	JPN	AUS	MAL	VAL		
2007	Team Roberts	**MI**	Kenny Roberts, Jr.	10	13	16	16	15	Ret	17	16												4	24th
2007	Team Roberts	**MI**	Kurtis Roberts	80						Ret	18	13	15	12	Ret	15	15	Ret	Ret	17	20	Ret	10	19th
