= Brooke Cars =

British car manufacturer

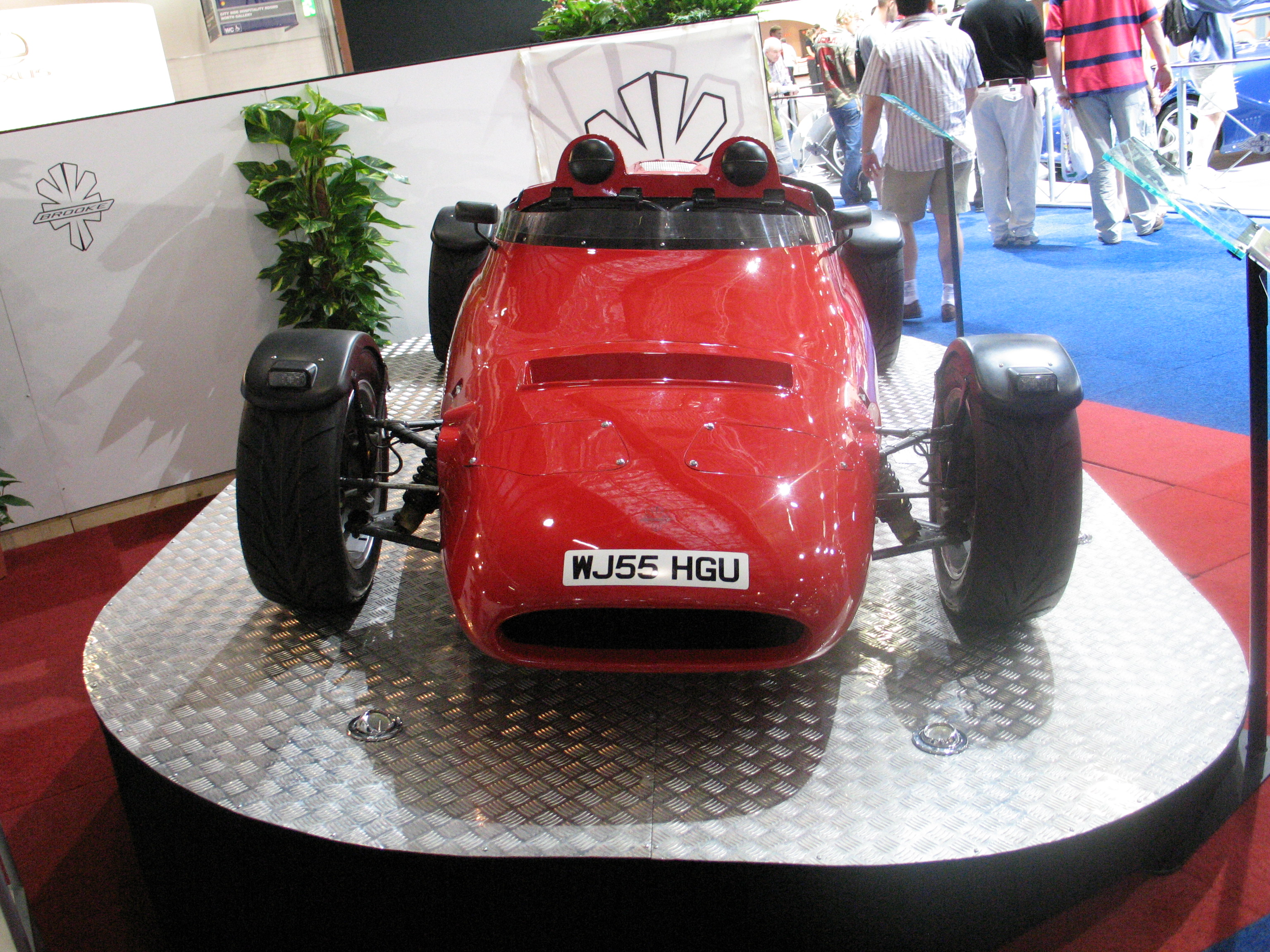
Brooke Double R at British International Motor Show 2006

Brooke Cars Limited is a British car manufacturer of specialist sports cars, based near Honiton in Devon, England. It was established in 2002, following the purchase of the vehicle rights from Brooke Kensington.

== Models ==
The company produces one model, the Double R, a lightweight two-seater open sports car weighing around 510 kg (1,120 lb). It is powered by a 2.3-litre Cosworth engine in a range of outputs from 200 bhp (149 kW; 203 PS) to 400 bhp (298 kW; 406 PS). The Double R is similar to the previous 1990s Brooke Kensington ME 190.
