= Eleanor Clymer =

American writer

- Born: Eleanor Lowenton; January 7, 1906; New York City, U.S.
- Died: March 31, 2001 (aged 96); Haverford, Pennsylvania
- Education: University of Wisconsin–Madison (B.A.)
- Occupation: Children's Book Writer
- Children: Adam Clymer

Eleanor Clymer (née Lowenton; January 7, 1906 – March 31, 2001), was an American children's author, best known for The Trolley Car Family (1947). She graduated from the University of Wisconsin–Madison in 1928 with a degree in English. Between the years of 1943 and 1983 she published 58 books, including The Tiny Little House, My Brother Stevie, and Hamburgers–and Ice Cream for Dessert.

Clymer was born in New York City, the daughter of Russian immigrants. Through much of her life she was a resident of Katonah, New York and an active member of the nearby Unitarian Universalist fellowship. In 1980 she was awarded the Rip Van Winkle award by the School Library Media Specialists of Southeastern New York for outstanding contributions to children's literature.

Her son, Adam Clymer, was a journalist with The New York Times. Clymer died in 2001 at the age of 95 in Haverford, Pennsylvania.
