= Adam Clymer =

American journalist (1937–2018)

- Born: April 27, 1937; New York City, U.S.
- Died: September 10, 2018 (aged 81); Washington, D.C., U.S.
- Education: Harvard College; University of Cape Town
- Occupation: Journalist
- Years active: 1950s–2003
- Spouse: Ann Fessenden (m. 1961; died 2013)
- Children: 1
- Relatives: Eleanor Clymer (mother)

Adam Clymer (April 27, 1937 – September 10, 2018) was an American journalist. He was a prolific political correspondent for The New York Times.

== Career ==
Clymer worked for the New York Daily News for a short period. Clymer worked for The New York Times from 1977 until July 2003, and served as its national political correspondent for the 1980 presidential election, and polling editor from 1983 to 1990. As polling editor, Clymer collaborated with CBS News. He worked as political editor for George H. W. Bush's presidential campaign in 1988, and chief Washington correspondent from 1999 through 2003.

Clymer covered the 2000 presidential campaign for the Times and wrote at least one article that was considered unfavorable by the campaign of George W. Bush. Clymer wrote an analysis of Cheney's tax returns, including his conclusion that he only gave 1% of his $20 million earnings to charity.

Clymer may be best known for an incident on September 4, 2000, when Bush and running mate Dick Cheney appeared at a campaign event in Naperville, Illinois. While on stage before the event, Bush said to Cheney, "There's Adam Clymer, major-league asshole from the New York Times." Cheney responded, "Oh yeah, he is, big time." The remarks were picked up by a live microphone, causing a minor campaign controversy. Bush subsequently remarked, "I regret that a private comment I made to the vice presidential candidate made it through the public airways. I regret everybody heard what I said," but declined to retract the comment itself.

While he never apologized for the comment itself, Bush made an attempt to smooth it over, making light of it at the next Washington Press Club Foundation Dinner by referring to Adam Clymer as a "major-league ass...et." For his part, Clymer noted that Bush sent him a nice letter of condolences when his mother died in 2001.

In 1981, Clymer co-authored Reagan: The Man, the President with fellow New York Times journalists Hedrick Smith, Leonard Silk, Robert Lindsey, and Richard Burt. In 1999, he wrote Edward M. Kennedy: A Biography.

In 2004, Clymer became a visiting scholar at the Annenberg Public Policy Center at the University of Pennsylvania, where he served as Political Director for the National Annenberg Election Survey.

== Personal life ==
Clymer was born in New York City on April 27, 1937. Born to a Unitarian family, the son of children's book author Eleanor Clymer (née Lowenton) and Kinsey Clymer, Clymer attended The Walden School in Manhattan and then Harvard College, receiving an A.B. in 1958. Clymer's journalism career began when he was in high school; he wrote for the school newspaper and collected sports scores for The New York Times. He did post-graduate work at the University of Cape Town, South Africa. In 1960, he joined The Virginian-Pilot in Norfolk, a job which he followed up with work at The Baltimore Sun and the New York Daily News.

Adam Clymer was married to Ann Clymer (née Ann Wood Fessenden) from 1961 until her death on February 10, 2013. They had one daughter, Jane Emily Clymer, who was killed at the age of 18 by a drunken driver in September 1985. The Clymers established a memorial scholarship at the University of Vermont in her name. As of 2013, the scholarship had aided fifty women in attending the university.

Clymer died from pancreatic cancer on September 10, 2018, in Washington, D.C., at the age of 81.

== Awards ==
- Everett McKinley Dirksen Award for Distinguished Reporting of Congress, 1993
- The Washington Monthly's Monthly Journalism Award, 2003, for his January 3, 2003 Times article, Government Openness at Issue as Bush Holds On to Records
- Carey McWilliams Award honoring a major journalistic contribution to our understanding of politics, American Political Science Association, 2003

== Books ==
- Smith, Hedrick; Clymer, Adam; et al. (1981). Reagan the Man, the President. Pergamon Pr. ISBN 0-08-027916-3.
- Clymer, Adam (1986). "The New York Times" Year in Review 1987. Three Rivers Press. ISBN 0-8129-1632-8.
- Clymer, Adam (2000). Edward M. Kennedy: A Biography. Perennial (HarperCollins). ISBN 0-06-095787-5.
- Clymer, Adam (2003). Journalism, Security and the Public Interest: Best practices for reporting in unpredictable times. Aspen Institute, Communications and Society Program. ISBN 0-89843-387-8.
- Clymer, Adam (2008). Drawing the Line at the Big Ditch. University of Kansas Press. ISBN 0-7006-1582-2
