= Clymer repair manual =

Vehicle repair manual brand

Clymer repair manuals are repair manuals that often focus on power sport vehicles such as motorcycles, all-terrain vehicles, personal water craft, and snowmobiles. Clymer also has several books dedicated to small engines and "outdoor power equipment" such as leaf blowers, chainsaws and other lawn and garden power equipment.

Clymer repair manuals are named after their creator Floyd Clymer, who is described in the Motorcycle Hall of Fame as a "pioneer in the sport of motorcycling", being a racer and race promoter, a magazine publisher, an author and a motorcycle manufacturer, dealer and distributor.

Clymer repair manuals are categorized as an aftermarket product or non-OEM. Unlike OEM manuals, Clymer repair manuals are written for the do it yourself as well as the professional and experienced mechanic. OEM manuals are often designed for a professional technician, who often has at their disposal an array of specialized tools, equipment and knowledge.

In 2013, Haynes Group Limited acquired Clymer repair manuals from Penton Media.

== Manufacturers covered ==
Clymer has over three hundred repair manuals that cover thousands of models.

- BMW
- Harley Davidson
- Honda
- Suzuki
- Yamaha
- Kawasaki
- Arctic Cat
- Polaris
- Ski-Doo
- Sea-Doo
- Evinrude/Johnson
- Chrysler outboard engines, 1966-1984
- Indmar/GM V-8 Inboard engines, 1983-2003
- Tohatsu
- Volvo Penta
- Force
- Mercury/Mercruiser
- Outboard Marine
- Allis-Chalmers
- Case
- Cockshutt
- Deutz-Allis
- New Holland
- International Harvester
- John Deere
- Kubota
- Massey Ferguson
- Minneapolis-Moline
- Mitsubishi
- Oliver
- White
- Yanmar

== See also ==
- Chilton Publishing Company
- Haynes Manuals
