= David Climer =

American sports columnist (1953–2020)

- Born: 1953
- Died: January 19, 2020 (aged 66); Nashville, Tennessee, U.S.
- Occupation: Sports journalist
- Years active: 1974-2015

David Climer (1953 – January 19, 2020) was a sports reporter and columnist for over four decades at The Tennessean, from 1974 to 2015.

Climer was raised in Lebanon, Tennessee, where he wrote for the school newspapers at Lebanon Junior High and Lebanon High School (where he was also a pitcher on the baseball team) before joining the Lebanon Democrat as a sportswriter.

In 1974, he began writing for The Tennessean on a part-time basis, earning a full-time assignment covering Tennessee State University in 1977. In 1984, he was assigned to the beat for University of Tennessee sports. In 1994, he became a columnist, writing about local and national sports stories.

Climer retired from The Tennessean in 2015. He continued to write columns for The Ledger, a weekly publication in Tennessee.

Over his career, Climer was named among the top ten columnists in the country by the Associated Press sports editors three times. In 2015, he was named to the Tennessee Sports Writers Hall of Fame.

In retirement, Climer moved to Fripp Island, South Carolina, with his wife, Rebecca.

In late 2019, Climer revealed that he had stage 4 pancreatic cancer. He died in Nashville, Tennessee on Sunday, January 19, 2020. He was 66.
