= Floyd Clymer =

American motorcycling pioneer

- Born: October 26, 1895; Indianapolis
- Died: January 22, 1970 (aged 74); Los Angeles
- Occupations: Motorsports racer, dealer and publisher
- Known for: Clymer repair manual series
- Awards: Motorcycle Hall of Fame

Floyd Clymer (26 October 1895 in Indianapolis – 22 January 1970 in Los Angeles), a pioneer in the sport of motorcycling, was a racer, a motorcycle dealer and distributor, a magazine publisher, a racing promoter, an author, and a motorcycle manufacturer. He was inducted into the Motorcycle Hall of Fame in 1998 and into the Motorsports Hall of Fame of America on March 17, 2020.

== Early life ==
Clymer was a natural salesman and became the youngest Ford dealer in the USA at the age of 14, in Greeley, Colorado. He began racing motorcycles in the 1910s, and was very successful though the 1920s, winning the National Sidecar Championship in 1920, the Pikes Peak Hillclimb and several other hill climb championships. He was involved in motorcycle racing throughout his life, including race promotion and organization. He owned a Harley-Davidson and Excelsior motorcycle dealership in the 1920s in Greeley.

== Publishing ==
Clymer is best known for his publishing business, "once the biggest automotive publishing organization in the world". His first publication, Motorcycle Topics, was published in the late 1910s, and he resumed publishing magazines and books in earnest after World War II. He published the popular Clymer repair manuals for cars, motorcycles and powersports vehicles in a standardized format to step-by-step disassembly and reassembly of the complete vehicle, illustrated with photographs. The Clymer manual became shorthand among home mechanics as a useful guide to vehicle maintenance and repair. In 2013, the Clymer manual business became part of the Haynes Group, and its titles are still published under the Clymer name. Clymer also published dozens of books on cars and motorcycles, and was among the first to assemble historical surveys of the car and motorcycle industries with his Treasury of Early American Motorcycles, Treasury of Early American Automobiles, Those Wonderful Old Automobiles, Henry's Wonderful Model T and Historical Motor Scrapbooks from the 1950s. He also published an annual yearbook for the Indianapolis 500 from 1946 to 1968, as well as collections of British car and motorcycle magazine road tests. Clymer purchased Cycle magazine from Petersen Publishing in July or August 1953, which had a circulation of several hundred thousand during his tenure to 1966. It was said of Clymer that "he never met a motorcycle he didn't like" and some criticized Cycle for failing to prompt improvements in motorcycle design through journalistic feedback.

== Motorcycle manufacturer ==
Clymer attempted to purchase the Indian motorcycle brand in the 1950s, and was successful in buying it in the early 1960s. By 1967, he had begun distribution of Indian-branded minicycles, with Jawa, Morini Franco and Morini Minarelli engines and chassis components using names such as Papoose, Ponybike and Boy Racer. The success of these small machines lead to the design and small-run assembly of the Indian Velo 500 from a mix of British drive train components from Velocette, Royal Enfield and Norton, in a specially-commissioned Italian chassis. The chassis included frames by Italjet, forks by Marzocchi and wheels by Grimeca. He also sought to promote the Münch motorcycle as an Indian, and commissioned Friedl Münch to create a motorcycle using a sidevalve Indian Sport Scout V-twin motor in a Münch chassis. While his minicycle line continued, and expanded, into the 1970s, the realization of these full-sized Indian cycles came to a halt when Clymer died of a heart attack in 1970, at age 74.
