= Haynes Manual =

Series of manuals on automobile maintenance

Haynes Publishing Group
- Founded: 1960
- Founder: John Haynes
- Country of origin: United Kingdom
- Headquarters location: Sparkford, Somerset
- Distribution: Grantham Book Service (UK)
- Publication types: Books
- Nonfiction topics: Automotive
- Imprints: Clymer
- Official website: haynes.com

Haynes Owner's Workshop Manuals (commonly known as Haynes Manuals) is a series of manuals from the British and American publisher Haynes Group Limited. The series focuses primarily on the maintenance and repair of vehicles.

The manuals are aimed at beginner and advanced DIY consumers rather than professional mechanics. Later, the series was expanded to include a range of parody practical lifestyle manuals in the same style for a range of topics, including domestic appliances, personal computers, digital cameras, model railways, sport, and animal care. Haynes also published the humorous Bluffer's Guides.

Additionally, Haynes has released parody manuals based on popular fictional series, including Star Trek and Thomas and Friends.

Haynes manuals owns and licenses a number of DIY brands including Clymer, Chilton, Gregorys, and Rellim.

== History ==
The Haynes manuals are named after John Harold Haynes (1938–2019) OBE. In 1956, while Haynes was at school, he published a book on building a 'special' based on the Austin 7. Haynes also published two other books while serving in the Royal Air Force. He was made an Officer of Order of the British Empire in the Queen's Birthday Honours List 1995 for services to publishing. In 1984, John Haynes purchased a disused sawmill in Sparkford, where he established the Haynes Motor Museum in July 1985 with an initial collection of 35 cars. Haynes died on 8 February 2019, aged 80.

J. H. Haynes & Co. Limited was founded on 18 May 1960, and its first manual was entitled Haynes Owners Workshop Manual. Austin-Healey Sprite was published in 1965.

Many Haynes Manual covers depict a cutaway view technical drawing of the appropriate vehicle. From 1972 to his retirement in 1991, these were drawn by artist Terry Davey, whose style and use of extensive technical detail became closely associated with the series. Since Davey's retirement, newer manuals have featured computer-generated images with less extensive cutaways.

Haynes also publishes a range of US Chilton manuals under license from Cengage. In 2013, Haynes acquired Clymer repair manuals from Penton Media. In 2020, Haynes was bought by Infopro Digital which publishes Revue Technique Automotive (RTA), a technical data company owned by TowerBrook Capital Partners, for £114.5 million.

== Repair manual printing ==
Haynes announced in December 2020 that it would not print any new repair manuals in the short term; all new repair content would be online only. However, in 2024, the company re-launched a new series of DIY manuals and continued offering a range of existing printed manuals to address the needs of the modern vehicle owner and made available on their website and quality retail channels.

== Strip-down and rebuild ==
The DIY vehicle manuals are created by disassembling and reassembling a vehicle. The cover of each manual specifies: "based on a complete strip-down and rebuild". Each section has step-by-step instructions with diagrams and photographs of an actual strip-down or rebuild.

== For deeper learning, advanced and semi-professionals DIYers ==
Manuals for garage professionals include books such as the Automotive Diesel Engine Service Guide, the Automotive Air Conditioning Tech-Book, Citroën and Peugeot Engine Management Systems, and two Engine Management and Fuel Injection Systems Pin Tables and Wiring Diagrams Tech-Book volumes.

== Distribution languages ==
Haynes manuals are published in 15 languages: English (including British, American and Australian dialects), French, Swedish, Chinese, Japanese, German, Czech, Finnish, Polish, Bulgarian, Hebrew, Greek, Danish, Spanish (including American Spanish dialects), and Russian.

== Location ==
The company has international offices across North America, Australasia, Europe and the UK. Originally based in Sparkford, a village near Yeovil in Somerset, England, the company rapidly expanded in order to ensure manuals respected the lifestyles of different international DIY cultures. The Haynes International Motor Museum is also in Sparkford, home to a large collection of classic and modern cars with many rarities.

== Authorship ==
Each Haynes manual is written by a team of authors. The car or motorcycle of interest is bought at the beginning of the project and sold at the end.

Although the workshop phase of the project usually lasts only four weeks, the vehicle is retained and tested for several months to ensure it is functioning correctly.

== Manufacturers ==
Haynes generally receives the cooperation of vehicle manufacturers in providing technical information, including mechanical tolerances and wiring diagrams. Some manufacturers also provide diagrams, photos and exploded assembly drawings from their official dealer repair manuals. According to Haynes, this information empowers customers to fix their vehicles to the best of their ability, or at least diagnose the issue before taking it to a mechanic.

== Fictional vehicles ==
Haynes also publishes manuals for fictional vehicles, such as the USS Enterprise (NCC-1701) from Star Trek and the Ecto-1 from Ghostbusters.

== Cultural references ==
Haynes manuals have been seen or referenced in popular culture :

- Motorheads - 2025 TV series
- Haynes Explains series covers topics like Marriage, Teenagers, Pensioners, and Festivals with mock fault-finding charts and exploded diagrams
- Saturday with John Toal (BBC Radio): The World of Haynes Manuals
- Vinyl Manual: Haynes published a Vinyl Manual that includes insights from DJs like Jazzy Jeff and Gilles Peterson, blending music culture with DIY ethos

== See also ==
- Auto mechanic
- Automobile repair shop
- How-to
