= MV Agusta 203/220 Bialbero =

MV Agusta 203 Bialbero MV Agusta 220 Bialbero
- Manufacturer: MV Agusta
- Production: 1955
- Predecessor: MV Agusta 175 Bialbero
- Successor: MV Agusta 250 Monocilindrica Bialbero
- Class: Racing
- Engine: 203/220 cc air-cooled, single-cylinder DOHC four-stroke
- Bore / stroke: 203 cc: 68 mm × 56 mm 220 cc: 71 mm × 56 mm
- Compression ratio: 10:1
- Transmission: Wet multi-plate clutch, 5 gears, chain drive
- Frame type: double cradle
- Suspension: Front: telescopic forks Rear: swingarm with hydraulic shock absorbers
- Brakes: Drum brakes
- Wheelbase: 1,230 mm (48 in)
- Weight: 96 kg (212 lb) (dry)

The MV Agusta 203 Bialbero and MV Agusta 220 Bialbero were Italian factory racing motorcycles made by MV Agusta to compete in the 1955 250 cc World Motorcycle Racing Championship. The machine won three GPs and with it MV Agusta won that year's 250 cc Constructors Championship.

== History ==
Meccania Verghera Agusta SpA in Gallarate manufactured helicopters, but its director, Count Domenico Agusta, was a big fan of motorsport and he had already taken the first steps towards road racing with his own motorcycles in the late 1940s. In 1950 he hired Piero Remor and Arturo Magni, two designers who had successfully worked for Gilera. They first made the MV Agusta 125 Bialbero, which bore similarities to the Benelli 250cc racer, and the MV Agusta 500 4C, an almost exact copy of the Gilera 500 4C. Eventually the count wanted to race in more and more classes, and so the racing department was commissioned to design a racing engine for the 250cc class.

== MV Agusta 203 Bialbero ==
By 1955, the 125 Bialbero had already been enlarged to 175 cc version, because the 175 cc class was still very popular in Italy at the time. The machine was further expanded to 203 cc to compete in the 250 cc World Championship. MV Agusta selected their riders from three retained riders dependent on the race: Bill Lomas, mainly because of his knowledge of the British circuits, Umberto Masetti and Luigi Taveri. Lomas had a busy season, as he was also employed by Moto Guzzi in the 350 and 500 cc classes. The Isle of Man TT, in particular, was a busy week for him, as he started in four classes: the Lightweight 125 cc TT (fourth with the MV Agusta 125 Bialbero), theLightweight 250 cc TT (first with the MV Agusta 203 Bialbero), the 350cc Junior TT (first with the Moto Guzzi Monocilindrica 350) and the 500cc Senior TT (seventh with the Moto Guzzi Monocilindrica 500). Two wins for Lomas, but also the first win for the 203cc MV Agusta. Masetti and Taveri also started in the Lightweight 250 cc TT, but both dropped out.

== MV Agusta 220 Bialbero ==
After the 1955 Isle of Man TT the machine was further enlarged to 220 cc by increasing the bore. At the next race, the German motorcycle Grand Prix at the Nürburgring, only Taveri started and finished fourth. In Assen, Taveri won convincingly, with a 41 seconds ahead second placed Masetti. Hermann Paul Müller finished third on the NSU Sportmax. Although only third, it was clear that he was competition for the world title. However, the rankings of Taveri and Masetti were very important for the constructors' title. In the Ulster Grand Prix, Müller was only sixth, but MV Agusta did not do well, Masetti was in third and Lomas fourth. In the final race, the GP des Nations at Monza, Carlo Ubbiali, who was already 125 cc world champion, won the 250cc class for MV Agusta, with Lomas fifth and Masetti sixth. The world title went to "HP" Müller, Bill Lomas came in second, Luigi Taveri fourth, Umberto Masetti fifth and Carlo Ubbiali seventh. MV Agusta won the constructor's title.

In 1956 the MV Agusta 220 Bialbero was succeeded by a fully-fledged 250cc machine, the MV Agusta 250 Monocilindrica Bialbero.

== Technical data ==
The 203 Bialbero had an air-cooled, single-cylinder, four-stroke engine with double overhead camshafts (DOHC). The camshafts were driven by a gear train. The valves were at an angle of 90° to each other and were closed by hairpin valve springs. The bore and stroke were 68 mm × 56 mm, giving an engine displacement of 203.4 cc. After the Isle of Man TT, the bore was increased to 71 mm, giving a capacity of 220 cc.

A Wet multi-plate was driven by gears from the crankshaft. The machine had five gears and the rear wheel was driven by a chain.

The MV Agusta had a double cradle frame that was constructed from chrome molybdenum tubes with a diameter of 25 mm × 1.2 mm. The front fork was a telescopic fork, and the rear suspension was swingarm with hydraulic shock absorbers.

== Bibliography ==
- Cook, R.A.B., ed. (1956). Motor Cycling Sports Yearbook 1956. Temple Press Ltd.
