= MV Agusta 250 Monocilindrica Bialbero =

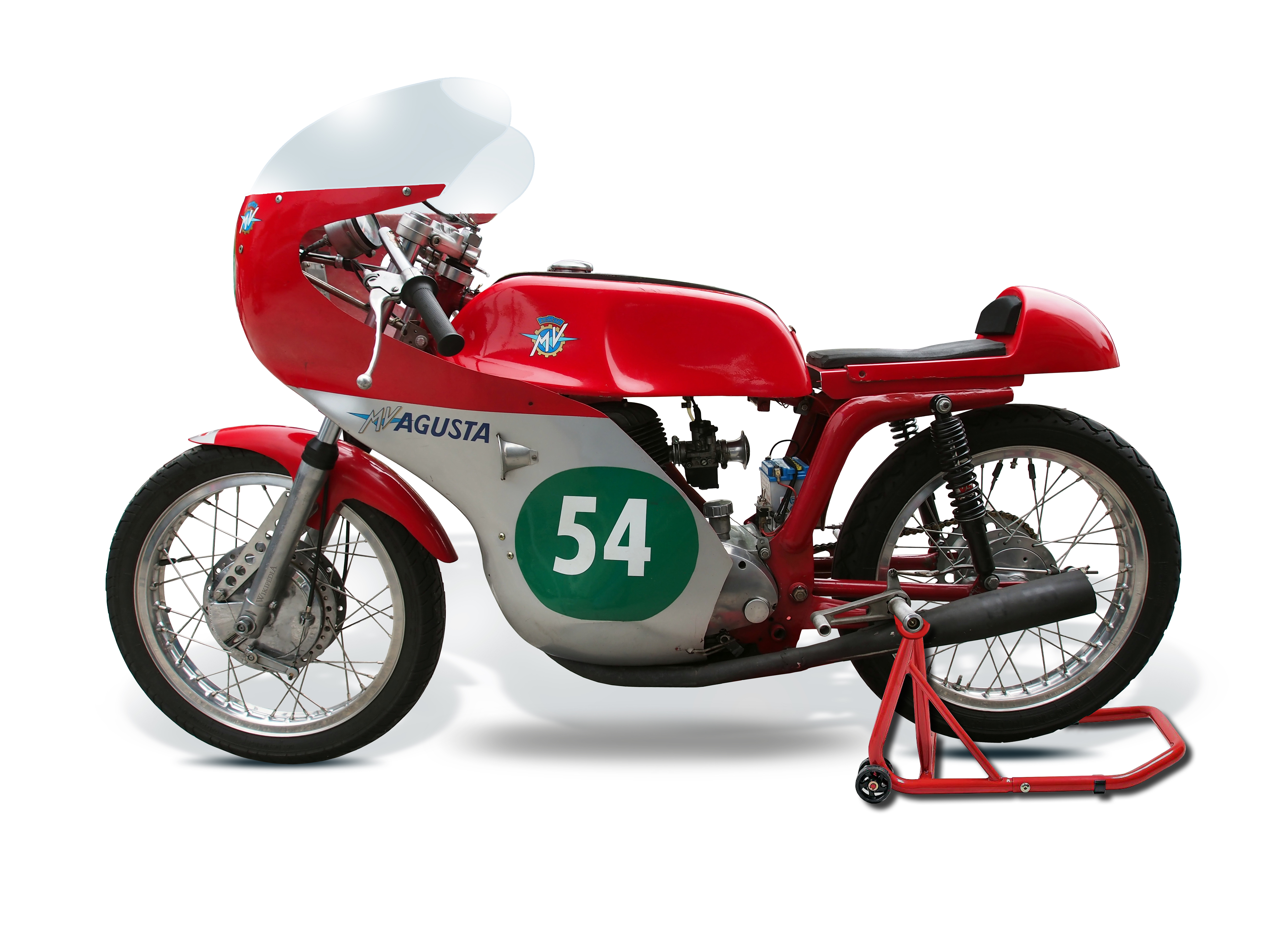
- MV Agusta 250 Monocilindrica Bialbero
- Manufacturer: MV Agusta
- Production: 1956–1959
- Predecessor: MV Agusta 220 Bialbero
- Successor: MV Agusta 250 Bicilindrica
- Class: Racing motorcycle
- Engine: 248.2 cc air-cooled, single-cylinder DOHC four-stroke
- Bore / stroke: 72.6 mm × 60 mm
- Compression ratio: 10:1
- Top speed: 125 mph (201 km/h)
- Power: 29 bhp (22 kW) at 9800 rpm
- Ignition type: coil
- Transmission: Wet multi-plate clutch, 5 gears, chain drive
- Frame type: double cradle
- Suspension: Front: telescopic forks Rear: swingarm with hydraulic shock absorbers
- Brakes: Front: 220 mm drum brake Rear: 180 mm drum brake
- Tires: Front: 250 x 19; Rear 275 x 19
- Wheelbase: 1230 mm
- Weight: 96 kg (dry)

The MV Agusta 250 Monocilindrica Bialbero was a 250 cc factory racer manufactured by the Italian brand MV Agusta from 1956 to 1959. With this machine 15 GPs, 2 Driver Championships and 2 manufacturers World Championships were won.

== Evolution ==
MV Agusta had started participating in road racing with motorcycles in the late 1940s and initially concentrated on the 125 and 500 cc classes. Piero Remor built the 125 "Bialbero" ("twin-cam") for the 125 cc class. The machine was subsequently bored to 175 cc because that class was still very popular in Italy and almost all major brands built production racers for it. The 175 cc machine was further bored to slightly above 200cc, so that in 1955 it was possible to compete in the 250cc class with the MV Agusta 203 Bialbero. After one race the capacity was further increased to 220cc. With that machine, Bill Lomas completed the 1955 season, finishing in third place in the World Championship. MV Agusta also won the constructor's title. In 1956 the machine was finally further developed into a fully-fledged 250cc racer, but that was not possible by further boring of the cylinder, so the stroke was increased from 56 mm to 60 mm.

== Technical ==
The engine was an air-cooled, single-cylinder, four-stroke engine with double overhead camshafts (DOHC). The camshafts were driven by a gear train. The valves were at an angle of 90° to each other and were closed by hairpin valve springs. The bore and stroke were 72.6 mm × 60 mm, giving an engine displacement of 248.2 cc. A Dell'Orto SS 25 A carburetor was used.

A Wet multi-plate was driven by gears from the crankshaft. The machine had five speeds. The rear wheel was driven by a chain.

The MV Agusta had a double cradle frame that was constructed from chrome molybdenum tubes with a diameter of 25 mm × 1.2 mm. The front fork was a telescopic fork, and the rear suspension was swingarm with hydraulic shock absorbers.

== Results ==
The machine was successful that year's championship: Carlo Ubbiali won five of the six GPs (in the Ulster Grand Prix he set the fastest lap but subsequently retired). Ubbiali was world champion and second in the championship was Luigi Taveri also riding an MV Agusta. MV's dominance in the 250cc class was helped by lack of competition from other factories. Moto Guzzi (third with Enrico Lorenzetti) had already stopped developing the 250 Bialbero in 1955, NSU (fifth with Horst Kassner) had withdrawn its factory team at the end of 1955 after the deaths of Rupert Hollaus and Gustav Baumm, and Kassner rode with an NSU Sportmax production racer. ČZ machines were by no means at the level of the Western brands, František Bartoš was only twelfth.

In 1957 the fortunes for MV Agusta changed. First, Mondial appeared with the 250 Bialbero and two top drivers: Cecil Sandford, who was the 1952 125 cc Champion, and brought experience to the team, and Tarquinio Provini, who was only 23 years old but very talented. The season started well for MV Agusta: Carlo Ubbiali won the first Grand Prix at the Hockenheimring and his teammate Roberto Colombo came in second. In the Lightweight TT, Taveri and Colombo came in second and third behind Sandford, while Provini set the fastest lap. Ubbiali and Provini dropped out. In Assen the MVs did not start. Provini won convincingly, ahead of Sandford and Sammy Miller. Remarkably, MV Agusta dropped this race, Colombo was there, but only started in the 125cc class, in which he finished second. Roberto Colombo died following an accident during practice for Spa-Francorchamps when he was using the MV Agusta 350 4C. MV withdrew from the 250 cc class for the rest of the season. However, John Hartle, on an experimental twin-cylinder MV Agusta still raced in Spa and won. Roberto Colombo was posthumously the best 250 cc MV driver that season. He finished fourth in the Championship, Ubbiali came fifth.

The fall of 1957 proved be a turning point for world road racing championships. All major Italian brands (Mondial, Moto Guzzi, Gilera and MV Agusta) decided to withdraw en bloc from the World Championships. The costs of racing were huge and disproportionate to the sales. For Moto Guzzi and Gilera this was especially so, because their income was solely from motorcycle sales. Mondial was able to make some money with transport tricycles and for Agusta, motorcycle production was still more a hobby than a profession. Count Domenico Agusta reversed his decision and continued the racing activities. In 1958, MV Agusta was the only remaining top racing marque competing, so could engage the top drivers of the time: John Surtees and John Hartle in the 350 and 500 cc classes and Tarquinio Provini and Carlo Ubbiali in the 125 cc and 250 cc classes. Provini won four of the six 250 cc races that season and became a world champion by a huge margin, and MV won the Constructors Championship.

The machine was still used in 1959 by privateers, but the factory riders had the new MV Agusta 250 Bicilindrica, on which John Hartle had already won in Belgium in 1957.

== Bibliography ==
- Cook, R.A.B., ed. (1956). Motor Cycling Sports Yearbook 1956. Temple Press Ltd.
- Cook, R.A.B., ed. (1957). Motor Cycling Sports Yearbook 1957. Temple Press Ltd.
