= MV Agusta 250 Bicilindrica =

250 cc factory racer manufactured by the Italian brand MV Agusta

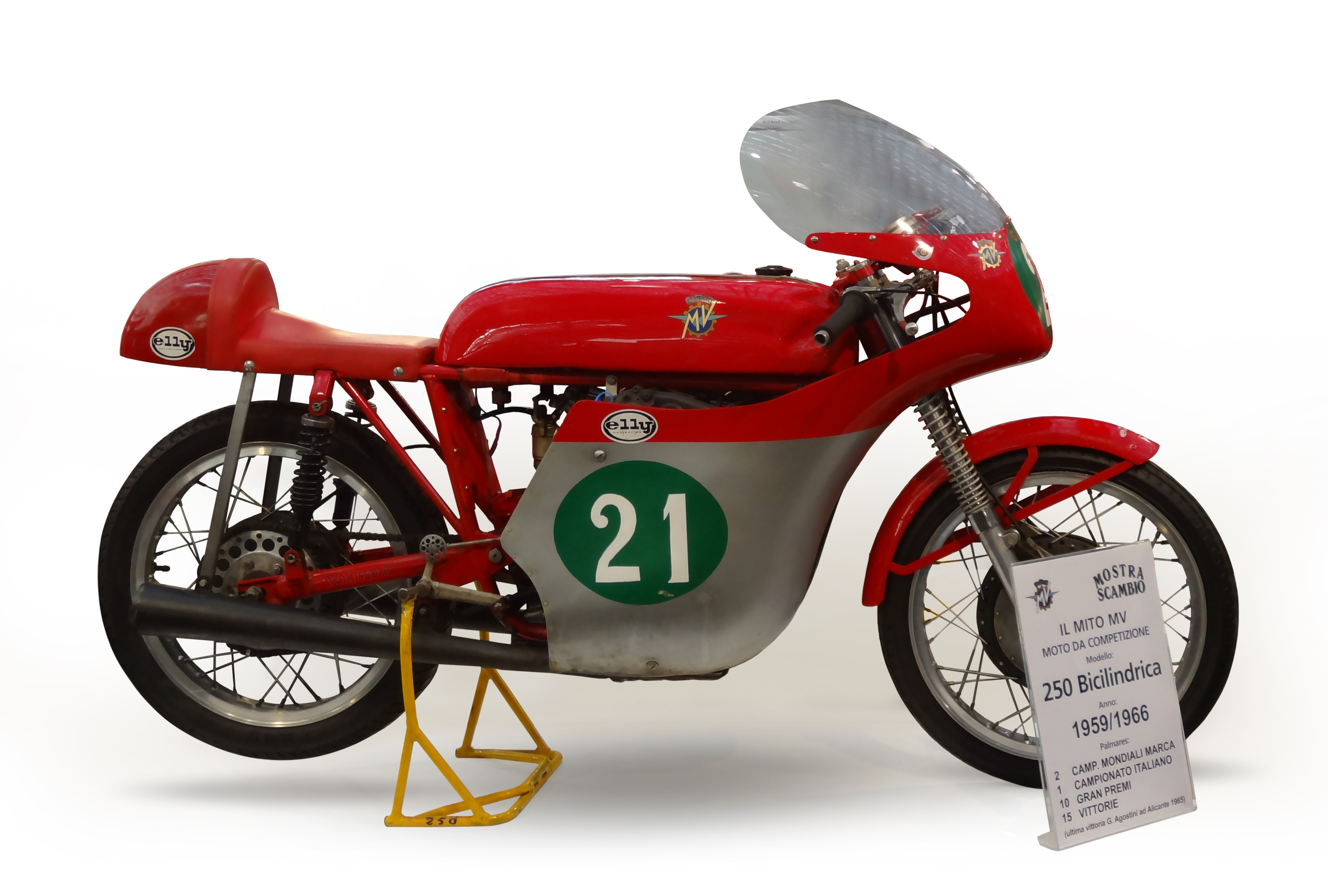
- Manufacturer: MV Agusta
- Production: 1957–1961
- Predecessor: MV Agusta 250 Monocilindrica Bialbero
- Successor: None
- Class: Racing motorcycle
- Engine: 247 cc (15 cu in) air-cooled, twin-cylinder DOHC four-stroke
- Bore / stroke: 53 mm × 56 mm (2.1 in × 2.2 in)
- Compression ratio: 10.8:1
- Top speed: 135 mph (217 km/h)
- Power: 36 bhp (27 kW) at 12,000 rpm
- Ignition type: coil
- Transmission: Dry multi-plate clutch, 6 or 7 gears, chain drive
- Frame type: double cradle
- Suspension: Front: telescopic forks Rear: swingarm with hydraulic shock absorbers
- Brakes: Front: 210 mm drum brake Rear: 210 mm drum brake
- Tires: Front: 275 x 18; Rear 275 x 18
- Wheelbase: 1310 mm
- Weight: 109 kg (dry)

The MV Agusta 250 Bicilindrica was a 250 cc factory racing motorcycle manufactured by the Italian brand MV Agusta from 1957 to 1961. With this machine 11 GPs, 2 Driver Championships and 2 manufacturers World Championships were won.

== History ==
MV Agusta had started participating in road racing with motorcycles in the late 1940s and initially concentrated on the 125 and 500 cc classes. Piero Remor built the 125 "Bialbero" ("twin-cam") for the 125 cc class. The machine was subsequently bored to 175 cc because that class was still very popular in Italy and almost all major brands built production racers for it. The 175 cc machine was further bored to slightly above 200cc, so that in 1955 it was possible to compete in the 250cc class with the MV Agusta 203 Bialbero. After one race the capacity was further increased to 220cc. With that machine, Bill Lomas completed the 1955 season, finishing in third place in the World Championship. MV Agusta also won the constructor's title. In 1956, a new single-cylinder was developed from the 220 with a fully-fledged 250 cc engine: the MV Agusta 250 Monocilindrica Bialbero. This machine was good for the world title of 1956, but in 1957 they had to bow their heads to FB Mondial. Tarquinio Provini became world champion on the Mondial 250 Bialbero.

== Development ==
The 250 Biclindrica ("two-cylinder") was developed in the new department in Cascina Costa, a neighbourhood in the south of Samarate in response to the dominance of the Mondial 250 Bialbero. This was the first racer that MV Agusta had developed entirely by itself. The single-cylinder still had all the characteristics of the pre-war Benelli 250 and the four-cylinder models were based on the Gilera 500 4C. The machine was first used at the 1957 Belgian Grand Prix at Spa-Francorchamps by John Hartle, who won the race. After Roberto Colombo died during practice at Spa, MV Agusta withdrew from the 250 cc class for the rest of the season, so the machine was not used again that year.

The fall of 1957 proved be a turning point for world road racing championships. All major Italian brands (Mondial, Moto Guzzi, Gilera and MV Agusta) decided to withdraw en bloc from the World Championships. The costs of racing were huge and disproportionate to the sales. For Moto Guzzi and Gilera this was especially so, because their income was solely from motorcycle sales. Mondial was able to make some money with transport tricycles and for Agusta, motorcycle production was still more a hobby than a profession. Count Domenico Agusta reversed his decision and continued the racing activities. Without other factory competition for the 1958 season, MV Agusta elected to use the tried and tested single-cylinder. Tarquinio Provini won four of the six 250 cc races that season and became a world champion by a huge margin, and MV won the Constructors Championship.

The twin-cylinder machine was used by the works riders of Carlo Ubbiali and Tarquinio Provini for the 1959 season. Some privateers competed on the older single-cylinder machine.

== Technical data ==
The engine was very slim. It was an air-cooled, twin-cylinder, four-stroke engine with double overhead camshafts (DOHC). The camshafts were driven by a gear train. The valves had diameters of 34 mm (inlet) and 32 mm (outlet) and had an angle of 90 ° between them. The cylinders were tilted 5 ° forward. The engine had a bore and stroke of 53 mm × 56 mm. Engine power was 36 bhp at 12,500 rpm, an improvement over the 250 single's 29 bhp. That was a very high end speed for that time and many experts thought that the engine would not be reliable using so many revs. A wet sump lubrication system was used and the ignition system was by ignition coil. Two Dell'Orto SS 31 A carburetors were used.

A dry multi-plate was driven by gears from the crankshaft. The gearbox had six or seven gears, dependent on circuit, and was of the cassette type. Final drive was by chain.

The machine was extremely slim, and probably developed by Arturo Magni. The frame, a chrome molybdenum double cradle, exhibited all the characteristics of Magni's later frames. The tube diameter was 25 mm × 1.2 mm. The front fork was a telescopic fork, and the rear suspension was swingarm with hydraulic shock absorbers. 210 mm drum brakes were used front and rear, the front being

== Results ==
1957

The machine was only entered in one race in 1957, the Belgian Grand Prix at Spa-Francorchamps, which John Hartle won on the 250 Bicilindrica.

1959

In the opening race of the season, the Lightweight TT, Tarquinio Provini won with Carlo Ubbiali second, less than 1/2 second behind. Ubbiali won the next race at Hockenheimring, followed by Provini winning at the TT Circuit Assen. Ubbiali also won the final race, the Nations Grand Prix at Monza. Ubbiali became world champion and Provini runner up. MV Agusta won the 250 cc Constructors Championship.

1960

For the 1960 season, Provini left to ride for Moto Morini and was replaced by Gary Hocking. Hocking convincingly won the first race of the season at the Isle of Man, Ubbiali, in second place, was over a minute behind. The 1 - 2 was reversed at Assen and Spa with Ubbiali winning both. The situation reversed again the German GP at the Solituderennen where Hocking came out on top. Ubbiali won the final two rounds (Ulster and Monza) and became World Champion, with Hocking runner-up. MV Agusta again won the 250 cc Constructors Championship.

1961

Carlo Ubbiali retired at the end of the 1960 season, leaving Hocking as the sole MV Agusta rider in the 1961 season. Hocking won the first race at the Montjuïc circuit in Spain, and retired in the Lightweight TT. The rest of the season was dominated by Mike Hailwood on the 4-cylinder Honda RC162. MV Agusta withdrew from the 250 cc class.

1966

In February 1966, Giacomo Agostini rode the machine to victory in a non-championship race in Spain.
