= MV Agusta 500 racers =

Motorcycles used to compete in 500cc Grand Prix motorcycle racing series

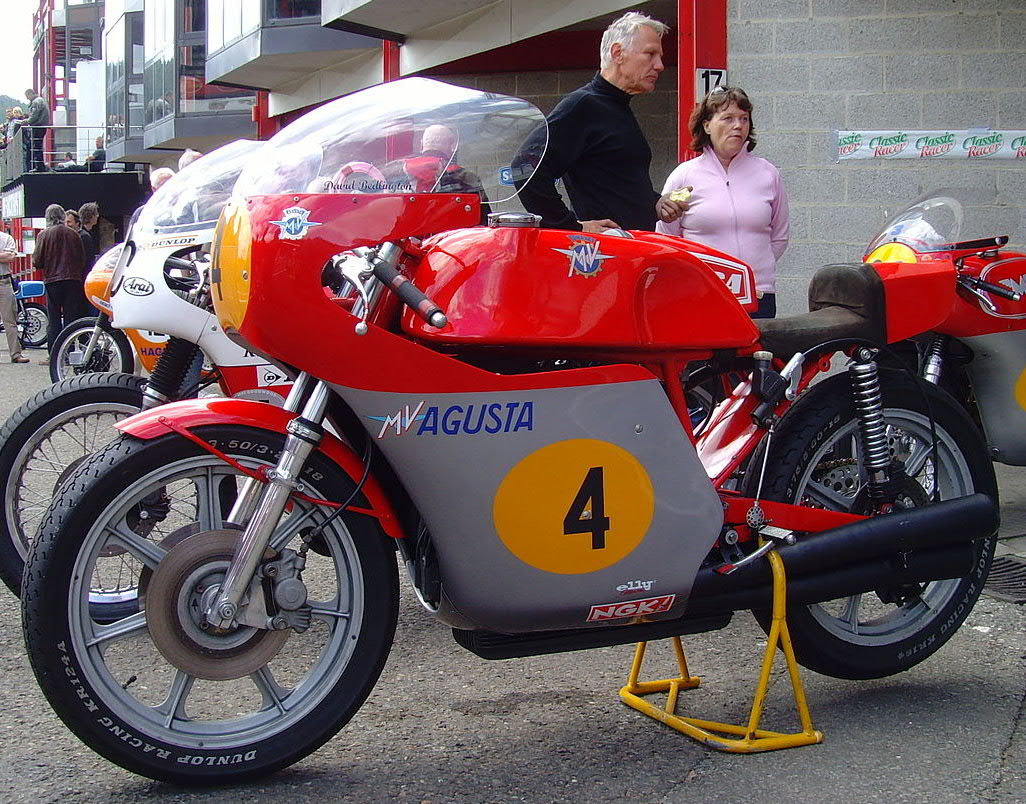
- Phil Read's 1974 MV Agusta 500 GP
- Manufacturer: MV Agusta
- Production: 1950–1976
- Class: Racer
- Engine: 500 cc

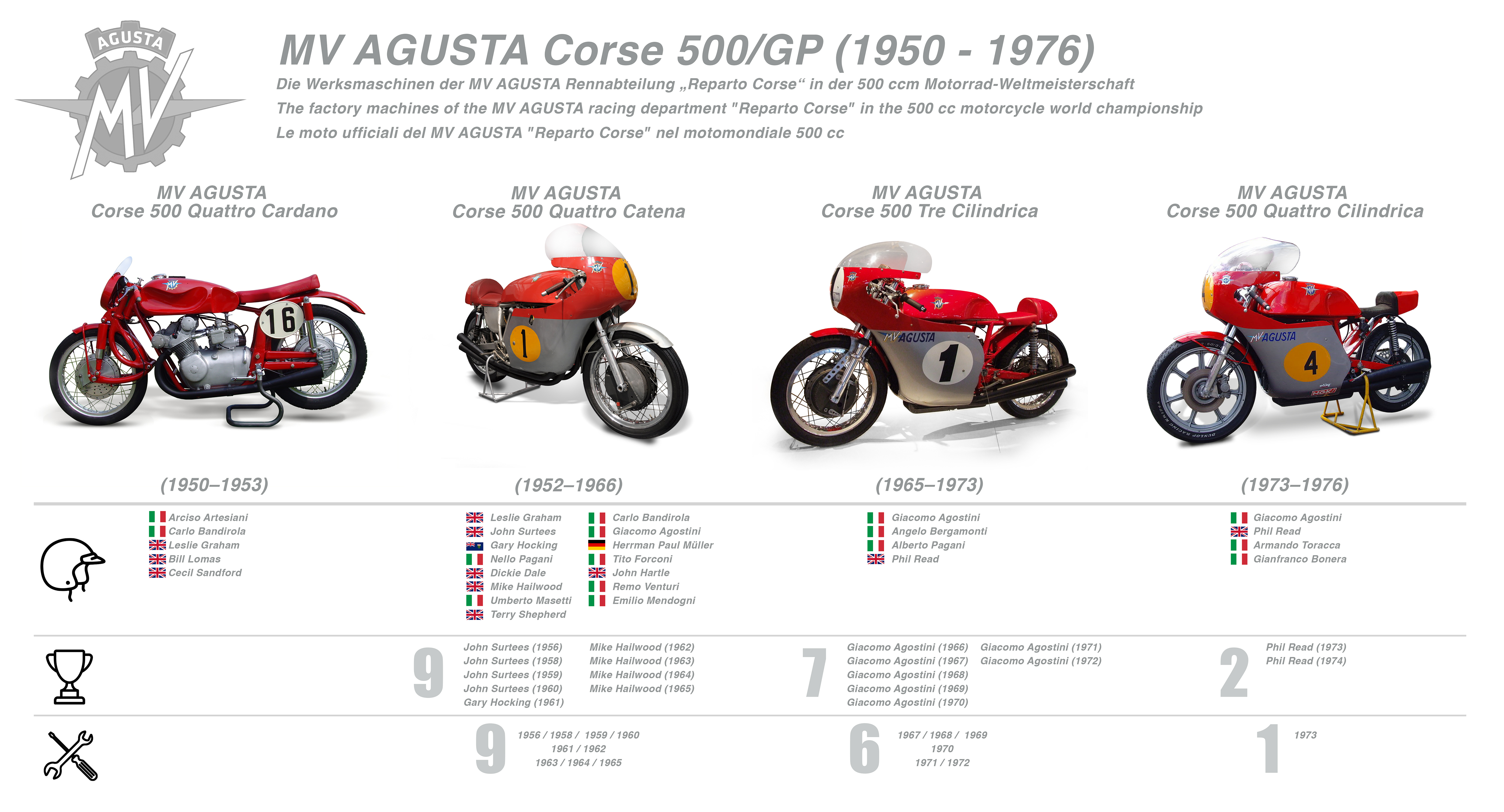
The factory machines of the MV AGUSTA racing department "Reparto Corse" in the 500 cc motorcycle world championship

The MV Agusta 500cc road racers were motorcycles that the manufacturer MV Agusta built and which were used to compete in 500cc Grand Prix motorcycle racing series between 1950 and 1976. 18 500cc world championship titles were achieved with these machines ridden by John Surtees, Gary Hocking, Mike Hailwood, Giacomo Agostini and Phil Read between 1958 and 1974.

== History ==
Piero Remor had developed racing engines for the Gilera brand before World War II. In addition to a supercharged 500cc four cylinder engine, he also built a 250cc four cylinder. After the war, he based a new 500cc machine on the pre-war designs. The new racer was tested for the first time in 1948. This Gilera 500 4C did not perform well, but Remor refused to make changes and put the blame on the riders. In 1949 he was fired by Giuseppe Gilera. Piero Taruffi became responsible for the development of the Gilera, which became the most successful racing engine in the 1950s. Piero Remor was hired by Count Domenico Agusta to develop racing engines for MV Agusta. Remor brought rider Arciso Artesiani to MV Agusta and first developed the MV Agusta 125 Bialbero. This was necessary because MV Agusta only had a 125 cc two-stroke that couldn't compete with Mondial and Moto Morini in this class. On 1 May 1950, engineer Arturo Magni also came to MV Agusta and became responsible for the further development of the racing engine. Magni had previously worked with Remor at Gilera from 1947.

== MV Agusta 500 4C 1950–1966 ==
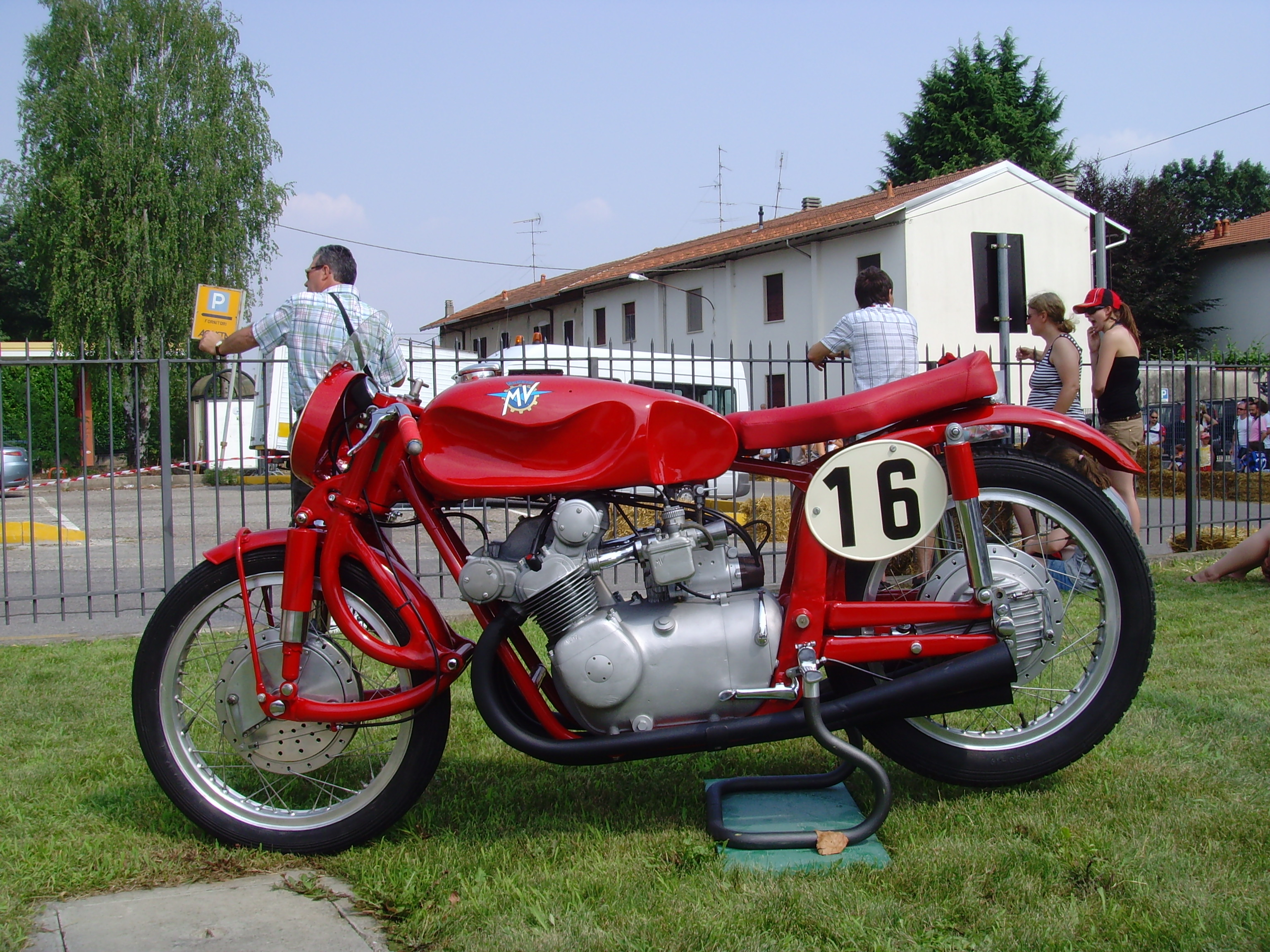
1951 MV Agusta 500 4C

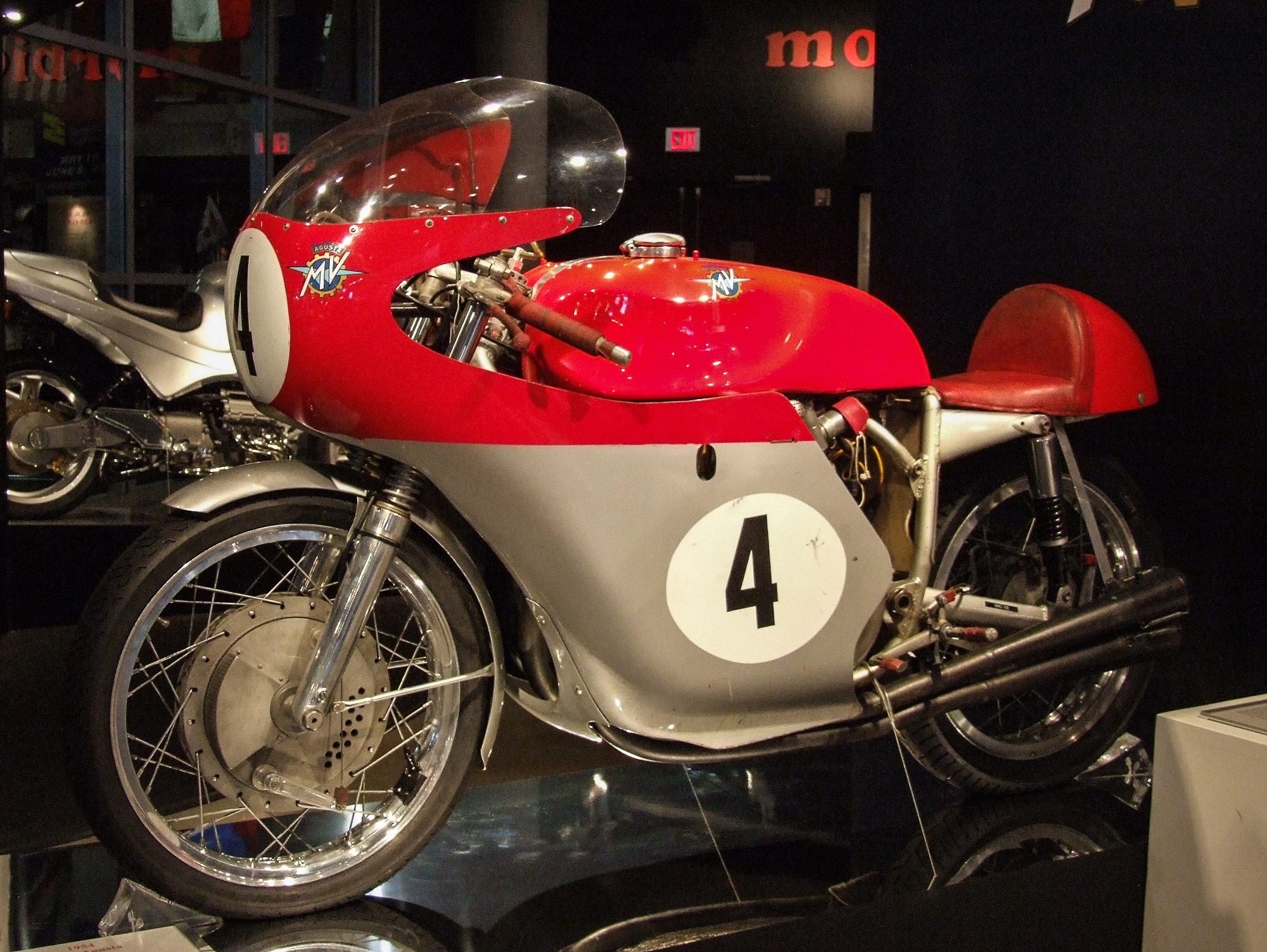
1954 MV Agusta 500 4C

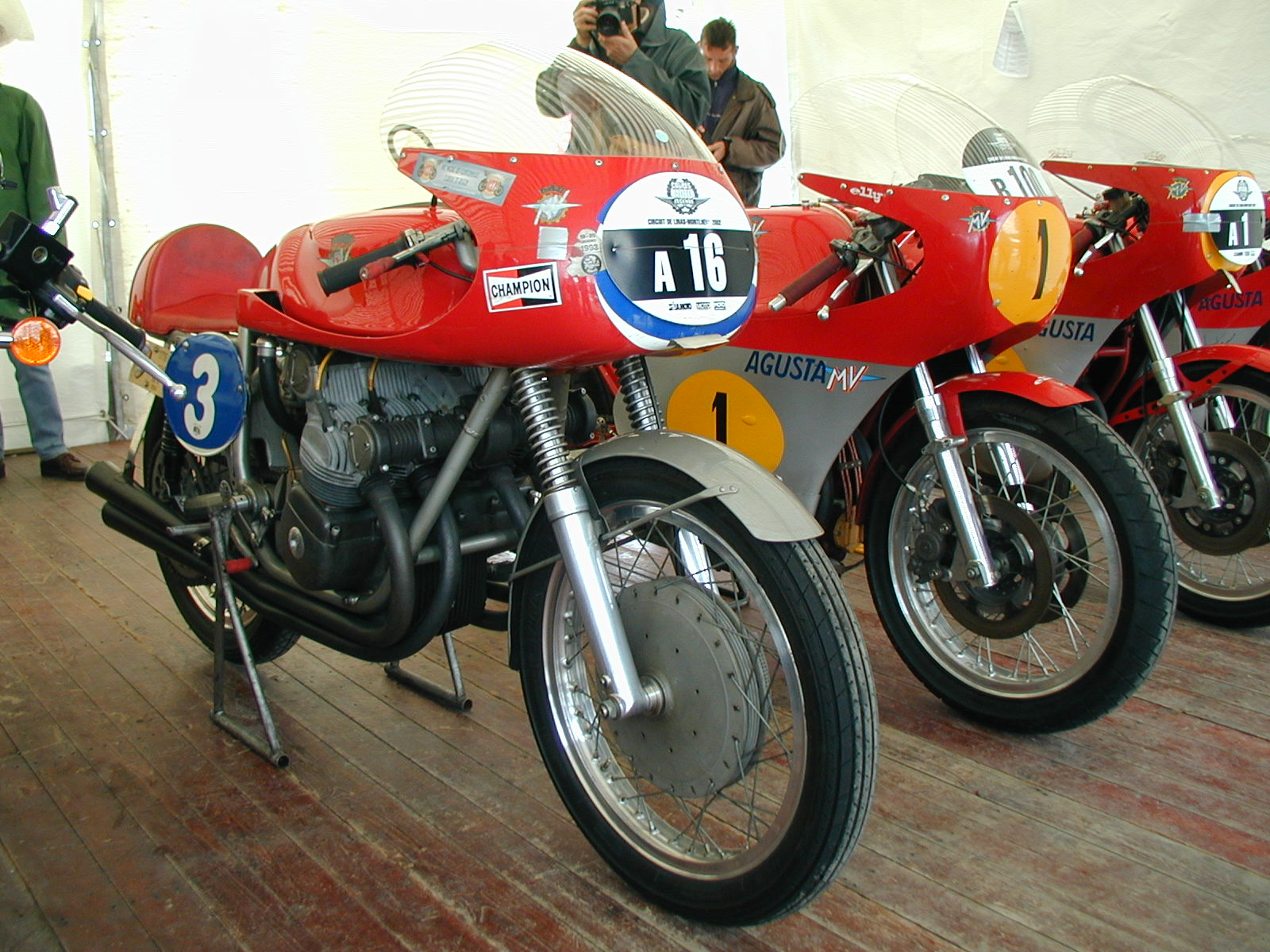
1956 MV Agusta 500 4C

Remor also provided MV Agusta with a new 500cc four-cylinder, the MV Agusta 500 4C (ilindri) (also known as the MV Agusta 500 Bialbero Corsa). From drawing board to test track it only took 15 weeks, but that was not surprising because the engine was almost identical to that of the Gilera 500 4C. MV Agusta and Gilera participated with almost the same motorcycles in the 1950 World Championship, something that Gilera were not happy with.

Count Domenico Agusta never released technical data of his machines and personnel, technical staff and riders were forbidden to divulge anything about the machines. Because a number of newer machines were later sold through auctions, data is known about these, but the machines from the early years sometimes remain a mystery. For example, there are different estimates of the engine configuration in 1950.

The most logical theory is that the MV Agusta 500 4C had a bore and stroke of 52 × 58 mm (492.7 cc), identical to that of the Gilera 500 4C and the MV Agusta 125 Bialbero, but occasionally bore and stroke of 54 × 54 mm (494.7 cc) are reported. The dimensions were changed in 1952 to 53 × 56 mm (494.2 cc). The shape of the combustion space was different from that of the Gilera, where a roof-shaped chamber was used to mount large valves. The valve angle was not less than 96°. As a result, high piston domes were needed to achieve the correct compression ratio. However, those high domes on the pistons hindered the gas flow and the ignition had to be very early to burn all the gases. With the first MV Agusta engines, the valve angles were smaller and a 45° angle between them. These machines also had valve diameters of 34 mm (inlet valve) and 32 mm (exhaust valve).

Remor filled the machine with experimental technology, but some things were clearly not favourable for performance. The girder fork was still quite logical, as the telescopic fork was not yet in vogue in Italy. However, the machine only had two carburetors, each of which had to feed two cylinders via Y-shaped manifolds. They used shaft drive, eliminating the possibility of chain lube getting on the rear tyre, but torque reactions on the opening and closing of the throttle. In addition, the adjustment of the gearing was very difficult. With a chain drive it was easy to replace the sprockets. The drivers had to use two pedals to shift: upshift on one side and downshift on the other. A parallelogram fork was used at the rear, which would have been useful to keep chain tension constant, but was not an advantage with shaft drive. The fork was equipped with torsion suspension and friction dampers. The frame was a double cradle, of which the front part was made from tubing and the rear pressed sheet metal. The machine underwent many changes in early 1951. at the Isle of Man TT There were now four carburettors, telescopic forks at the front and hydraulic shock absorbers at the rear. For the 1952 season, Remor changed the powertrain: the machine got chain drive and chrome molybdenum Earles forks at the insistence of rider Les Graham. After Piero Remor's departure at the end of 1953, Arturo Magni had overall responsibility for the machines. He turned out to be an excellent frame builder, but technical development was slow. John Surtees however, had experience the Featherbed frame from Norton and, just like Geoff Duke at Gilera, he also convinced Arturo Magni to "Nortonize" the frame. Moreover, he refused to ride with the Earles front fork and the MV Agusta received a telescopic fork with external coil springs. The MV Agusta 500 delivered around 65 hp at 10,500 rpm in 1956, making the engine powerful enough to match the Gilera and about 15 hp more powerful than a Norton Manx. At the end of its development in 1966, the two-valve four-cylinder MV Agusta delivered 70 hp at 11,000 rpm.

=== Technical data 1950–1966 ===
MV Agusta 500 4C	1950	1951	1952	1953	1954	1955	1956	1957	1958	1959	1960	1961	1962	1963	1964	1965	1966
Valvetrain	DOHC with two valves per cylinder																
Engine configuration	Four-stroke transverse in-line four-cylinder engine																
Engine cooling	Air cooling																
Bore	54 mm		53 mm					52 mm									
Stroke	54 mm		56.4 mm					58 mm									
Engine displacement	494.7 cc		497.7 cc					492.7 cc									
Lubrication system	Wet sump																
Carburetors	2 × Dell'Orto 28 mm		4 × Dell'Orto 28 or 29 mm (depending on circuit)				4 × Dell'Orto 29 mm										
Max power	50 bhp (37 kW) @ 9,000 rpm				60 bhp (45 kW) @ 10,500 rpm		65 bhp (48 kW) @ 10,500 rpm	70 bhp (52 kW) @ 11,000 rpm				Unknown					80 bhp (60 kW) @ 12,000 rpm
Top speed	120 mph (190 km/h)		125 mph (201 km/h)		145 mph (233 km/h)			160 mph (260 km/h)				Unknown					165 mph (266 km/h)
Primary drive	Gears																
Clutch	Wet multi-plate																
Gears	5					5, 6 of 7 (depending on circuit)											
Final drive	Shaft drive		Chain drive														
Frame	Double cradle																
Front forks	Girder forks	Girder or Telescopic forks	Earles forks	Telescopic fork													
Rear forks	Parallelogram		Swingarm														
Rear suspension	Torsion springs with friction dampers	Torsion springs with hydraulic shock absorbers	Coil springs with hydraulic shock absorbers														
Brakes	Drum brakes																

=== Timeline 1950–1966 ===
1950

In 1950 the MV Agusta team did not undertake the long journeys to the Ulster Grand Prix and the Isle of Man TT. In the Belgian Grand Prix, Artesiani was fifth, in the Dutch TT he dropped out, in the Swiss Grand Prix he was twelfth and in the Nations Grand Prix at Monza he was third. Artesiani was eighth in the world championship. For a motorcycle that was developed so quickly, that was an excellent start. In Assen, a machine was also made available to Reg Armstrong, but he had to change a spark plug and was only ninth. However, when the machines did not appear in Ulster in spite of their registration, Armstrong quit. Guido Leoni replaced him at the Nations Grand Prix and finished twelfth.

1951

In November 1950, former world champion Les Graham came over from AJS. He immediately began to propose changes to the machine. Some were also used, but 1951 was not a successful year for MV Agusta. Graham dropped out in the Senior TT and the Grand Prix of Switzerland, where Carlo Bandirola (who had moved from Gilera) was fourth. That was the best result of the entire year.

1952

In 1952 it went better with the MV Agustas. Carlo Bandirola finished third in the opening race in Switzerland, while Graham dropped out when his machine didn't want to start after a pit stop. Graham was second in the Senior TT. He had even been in the lead, but took it a little too quietly in the final round, so that Reg Armstrong won with a Norton Manx (Grastrong couldn't have known that Armstrong was faster due to the staggered start). In the TT of Assen and the Belgian Grand Prix, Graham dropped out, but in the GP of Germany, Graham finished fourth despite a pit stop. Bill Lomas joined Les Graham an MV Agusta in the Ulster Grand Prix. Graham had to stop the race when the tread of his rear tire disappeared, but Lomas finished third. In the last two GPs MV Agusta won: Graham won the Grand Prix des Nations and the GP of Spain, but second places from Umberto Masetti were enough to bring the world title to Gilera.

1953

The victories in the last races of 1952 gave hope for the new season, but in the opening race, the Senior TT, Les Graham was killed at the foot of Bray Hill when he tried to stay with Geoff Duke (Gilera). At the age of 43, Graham had become a father figure for many drivers and he was a personal friend of Domenico Agusta. Agusta was very concerned about the accident and ordered an extensive investigation into possible causes and withdrew the team from World Championship races. The team contested the final race in Spain where Carlo Bandirola came in second.

1954

In the 1954 Isle of Man TT, Dickie Dale and Bill Lomas started the race on MVs. Dale finished 7th whilst Lomas dropped out after three laps. Dale didn't score a single podium until Spain, when the world title had already been decided and the other teams did not appear, he won, while Nello Pagani was third on the other MV Agusta.

1955

Before the start of the 1955 season, Count Agusta contracted the young rider Ray Amm, winner of the Senior TT of 1954. Amm, however, would never ride a Grand Prix for MV Agusta. At Easter the team rode the Coppa d'Oro Shell Race at the Imola Circuit. In pursuit of Ken Kavanagh on a Moto Guzzi, Ray Amm lost control of his MV Agusta 350 4C at the Rivazza corner. He crashed on the slippery track and died in hospital from his injuries. Umberto Masetti came over from Gilera to support Carlo Bandirola. In Spain Bandirola came second and Masetti third. Masetti won the last race of the season at Monza.

1956

MV Agusta signed John Surtees for 1956. The 22-year-old Surtees had received a factory machine from Norton manager Joe Craig in 1955 on which he defeated reigning champion Duke at Silverstone and at Brands Hatch. Norton stopped racing activities after 1955, so Surtees signed with MV, where he soon earned the nickname figlio del vento (son of the wind). Without opposition from factory Nortons and, in the first half of the season, the Gileras, Surtees won the first three GPs. Surtees broke his arm in Germany and couldn't compete for the rest of the season. His 3 wins were enough to win the first world title for MV Agusta.

1957

In 1957 expectations were high. It looked like being an exciting season as Gilera was again at full strength with riders like Geoff Duke, Libero Liberati and Bob McIntyre, while MV Agusta fielded Surtees and Terry Shepherd (Umberto Masetti also raced at Monza). In Germany, Surtees dropped out, while Shepherd only finished fifth. Surtees made a mistake with the Senior TT. He did not trust the weather and decided to drive without the crosswind sensitive dustbin fairing. McIntyre gambled on good weather and did use the streamliner. That worked: he became the first driver in history to average the magical "ton" (100 miles per hour) on the circuit and finished two minutes ahead of Surtees. Liberati had already won in Germany but had not gone to the Isle of Man. In the remainder of the season, however, Gilera put all the weight behind Liberati, who finished second in Assen but then won two more GPs. Liberati also won in Belgium, but he was disqualified and Surtees was declared the winner. Surtees didn't finish on three occasions in 1957 and had to settle for third place in the championship.

1958

At the end of 1957 the major Italian brands Gilera, FB Mondial, Moto Guzzi and MV Agusta announced that they would end racing activities. The high costs were not in proportion to sales and the sport had become far too expensive. Count Agusta however reversed this decision. The lack of competitors (BMW, NSU and Norton had already stopped in previous years) meant that the development of the six-cylinder engine was no longer necessary and that MV Agusta could win world titles without major opposition. MV Agusta won eight world titles that season: individual and constructor titles in the 125, 250, 350 and 500cc classes. John Surtees won six of the seven 500cc GPs (he did not race in the seventh, the Swedish Grand Prix).

1959

In 1959 things went even better, Surtees won in the 500 and 350cc classes in all rounds of the championship. In the 500cc class, his teammate Remo Venturi was second in the final rankings.

1960

Surtees and Remo Venturi were the riders for MV in the 1960 championship, except for the Isle of Man TT, where John Hartle rode Venturi's machine because of his knowledge of the circuit. Surtees won all competitions again, except the Assen TT where he dropped out and Remo Venturi won, and the Ulster Grand Prix. MV again became world champion in all solo classes, but at the end of the season John Surtees retired from motorcycles to pursue his career as a Formula One driver.

1961

Gary Hocking had ridden for MV Agusta in the 125, 250 and 350cc classes in 1960 and was chosen to replace John Surtees in the 500cc class in 1961. However, he officially rode as a privateer with MV Agusta, and "MV PRIVAT" was displayed on the fairing. He won the first two GPs (Germany and France) but dropped out in the Senior TT when his throttle stuck, and even after a pit stop could not be resolved. He then won in Assen, Belgium and East Germany. Count Agusta invited Mike Hailwood to ride for MV from the Grand Prix of Nations. However, Hailwood was not about to play second fiddle and in the fierce battle with Hocking, the latter fell and Mike Hailwood won. In Sweden, Hocking and Hailwood came first and second. The team did not travel to the Grand Prix of Argentina. Hocking became world champion and Hailwood finished second.

1962

Hocking was not comfortable with MV Agusta following the rivalry with Hailwood, especially when Hailwood got a contract for 1962. At the Isle of Man, Hocking finished second in the Junior TT and won the Senior TT. The death of his friend Tom Phillis following a crash in the Junior TT, caused Hocking to retire of motorcycle racing. Hailwood won all other round (except Finland and Argentina, where MV didn't enter) and became 500 cc world champion.

1963

In 1963 Hailwood was supreme on the MV Agusta. The outdated British single-cylinder bikes from Norton and Matchless could not compete with the Italian machines. Yet a new "old" competitor joined the fray. Geoff Duke had convinced Gilera to make the six - year old Gilera 500 4C available to his Scuderia Duke team, and with that John Hartle won the Assen TT after Hailwood had dropped out. Hailwood won the rest of the races that season and the World Championship, Hartle came third.

1964

The 1964 world road racing championship went smoothly for MV Agusta. When Hailwood won the first six GPs, the title was safe and MV did not go to the Ulster Grand Prix and the Grand Prix of Finland. MV Agusta of course couldn't stay away in Monza and Hailwood also won there.

1965

In 1964 Count Agusta had his eye on a young Italian: Giacomo Agostini had performed well with Moto Morini and was signed for the MV Agusta team. He was clearly not able to cope with Hailwood, who won almost all GPs and often lapped the entire field except Agostini. MV Agusta, however, sent Agostini to Finland because he still had a chance to win the 350cc title and the leader in the championship, Jim Redman (Honda) could not start due to a broken collarbone. Ago also started in the Finnish 500cc race which he won.

1966

The four cylinder machine was used for the first round of the championship in West Germany only, the new three cylinder bike was used for the rest of the season.

== MV Agusta 500 3C 1966–1973 ==
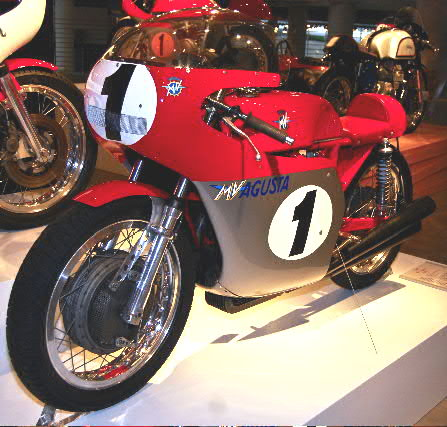
MV Agusta 500 3C

The three-cylinder machine was first raced at the 1966 Dutch TT. The machine was based on the MV Agusta 350 3C that had been used in the previous season (1965). Count Agusta had wanted a 350 cc three-cylinder because he was impressed by the three-cylinder two-stroke DKW RM 350. Arturo Magni and designer Mario Rossi tried to dissuade him, but the count insisted. He even suggested adding an extra cylinder to the MV Agusta 250 Bicilindrica. When the three-cylinder engine seemed ready, Count Agusta was displeased because there were only two valves per cylinder. Within a week the technicians converted the engine to four valves per cylinder and that immediately yielded an extra 6 horsepower. In 1966 a version with the engine enlarged to 420 cc was produced for the 500 cc class. The engine stood out due to the large oil pan and the oil cooler in the streamlined fairing to prevent the engine from overheating. The 420 cc machine was replaced in 1967 by a fully-fledged 500 cc machine. The three-cylinder was replaced in 1973 by a new four-cylinder.

=== Technical data 1966–1973 ===
MV Agusta 500 3C	1966	1967	1968	1969	1970	1971	1972
Valvetrain	DOHC with four valves per cylinder						
Engine configuration	Four-stroke transverse in-line three-cylinder engine						
Engine cooling	Air cooling						
Bore	57.4 mm	62 mm					
Stroke	54 mm	55 mm					
Engine displacement	419.2 cc	497.9 cc					
Lubrication system	Wet-sump						
Carburetors	Unknown						
Max power	Unknown	76 bhp (57 kW) @ 11,500 rpm	Unknown	85 bhp (63 kW) @ 12,500 rpm			
Top speed	240 km/h (150 mph)						
Primary drive	Gears						
Clutch	Dry multi-plate						
Gears	7			6			
Final drive	Chain drive						
Frame	Double cradle						
Front forks	Telescopic fork						
Rear forks	Swingarm						
Rear suspension	Coil springs with hydraulic shock absorbers						
Brakes	Drum brakes						

=== Timeline 1966–1973 ===
1966

With Hailwood and Jim Redman on the Honda RC181s, MV Agusta had a strong opposition for the first time since 1958. Due to falls and setbacks, Hailwood was able to finish until the fifth Grand Prix, Czechoslovakia GP, grabbing his first points. Redman broke an arm at the TT in Assen and was eliminated. In that race, Agostini started with the new machine, the three-cylinder MV Agusta 500 3C, which at that time was no more than an MV Agusta 350 3C bored out to 420 cc. In the GDR both Hailwood and Agostini dropped out. Agostini destroyed his new three-cylinder in a crash and then had to fall back on the old MV Agusta 500 4C. Three races before the end of the season Redman, Hailwood and Agostini could still become world champions. Hailwood won two, but in Monza his mechanics had to build him a machine from two broken Hondas, and there was no time to find a good set-up. Hailwood crashed out and Agostini became world 500 cc champion.

1967

The machine was increased to a full 500 cc for the 1967 season. Prior to Monza, the penultimate race, Agostini and Hailwood had won four races each. Agostini won in Monza, leaving him needing to score one point in the Grand Prix of Canada to win the world title. He became second behind Hailwood in Canada and won the champion.

1968

For 1968, Honda pulled out of Grand Prix racing, but paid Hailwood £50,000 not to ride for another team. MV's opposition came from small teams that made their own motorcycles, such as Paton and Linto, or improved British single-cylinders, such as Seeley and Rickman Métisse. Agostini had no problems with the opposition and won all the 500cc Grands Prix and became world champion again.

1969

The 1969 season started well for Giacomo Agostini. In the first races he lapped the entire field (even after a bad start and a fall in the Grand Prix of Spain) or won by a huge margin. The Snaefell Mountain Course was 60 kilometers long and Ago was taking it easy, but his 9 minutes lead would equate to 2 to 3 laps on an average circuit. At the 14-kilometer Circuit Spa-Francorchamps, only Percy Tait (Triumph) stayed in the same lap. Count Agusta had his own lodge at Monza, but the Grand Prix was moved to Imola. The count did not like that and the team boycotted the race. The team also did not go to the Grand Prix of the Adriatic Sea.

1970

In 1970 the two-stroke engines were clearly on the rise, with racing versions of the Kawasaki H1 Mach III and overbored Yamaha TR2's. The Yamahas, however, only about 351 cc, while the Kawasakis consumed a lot of fuel and often had to refuel during the race. Agostini won ten Grands Prix and his new teammate, Angelo Bergamonti, the eleventh.

1971

The 1971 season started sadly for MV Agusta, when Angelo Bergamonti was killed in a crash during the spring race in Riccione. Agostini won the first eight GPs in 1971. The Senior TT earned him his 75th GP win and in the GDR he won his 80th, setting a new record. MV did not go to the Ulster Grand Prix. In Monza, Ago's three-cylinder engine broke for the first time, but Alberto Pagani, now riding a second MV Agusta, won the race. MV Agusta did not compete the Spanish Grand Prix again.

1972

Alberto Pagani, the son of former rider Nello Pagani, was given a full-time ride alongside Agostini in 1972. Alberto had to settle for second place to Agostini for the entire season except in the Grand Prix of Yugoslavia, where Agostini dropped out. When Gilberto Parlotti, a personal friend of Giacomo Agostini, crashed and died during the Lightweight 125 cc TT, the course was considered too dangerous for international competition by many riders. The MV Agusta team decided never to compete at the Isle of Man again. In October 1972, the Italian brands Aermacchi-Harley-Davidson, Benelli, Ducati, Morbidelli, Moto Villa and MV Agusta petitioned to remove the Isle of Man TT from the World Championship calendar. The Italian federation distanced itself from this, and it was not discussed at the 1972 FIM congress, but many top riders never participated at the Isle of Man TT again.

== MV Agusta 500 4C 1973–1976 ==
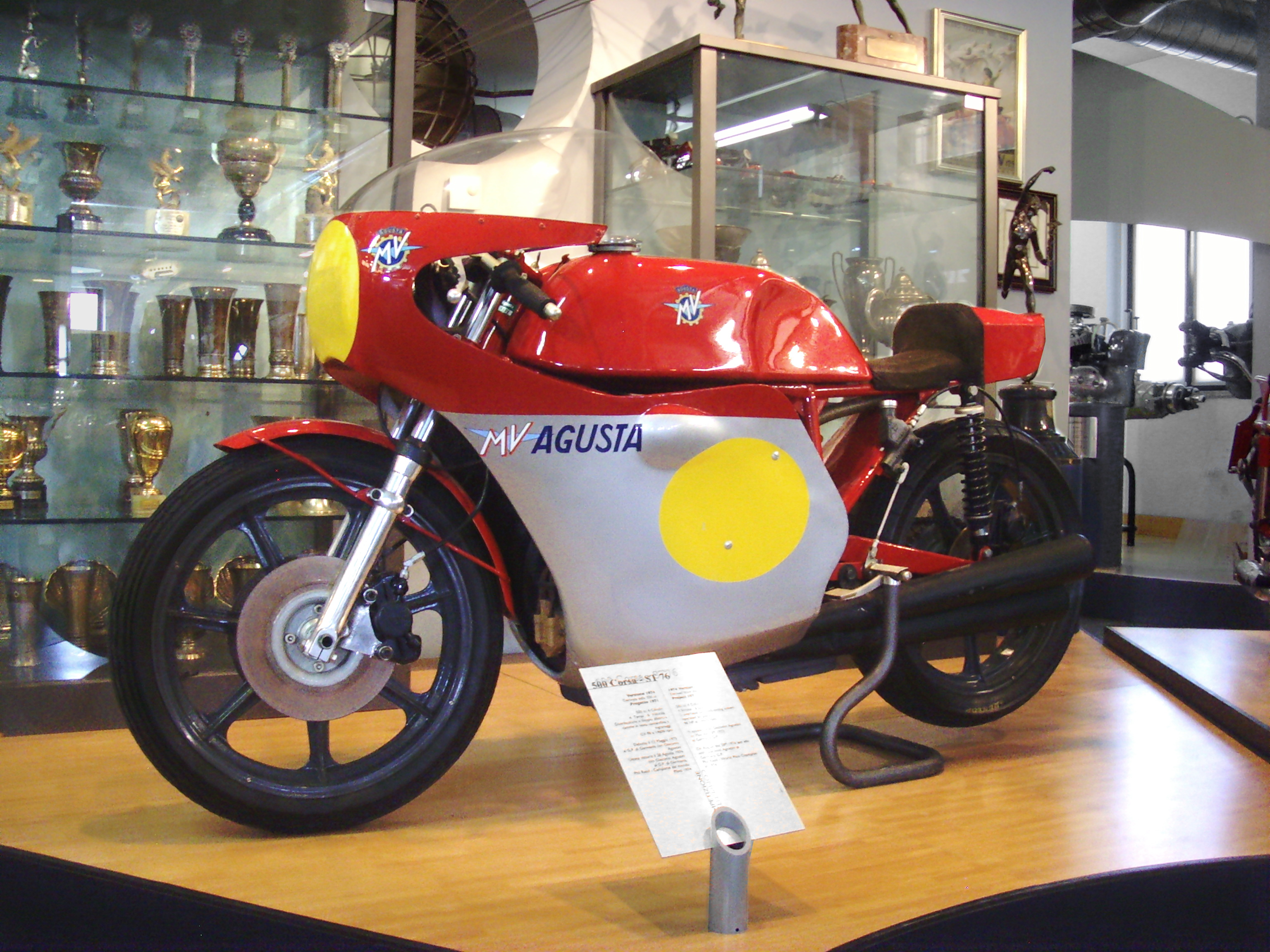
1976 MV Agusta 500 4C

A new four-cylinder MV Agusta debuted in 1973. Initially the engine was only 430 cc, being an over-bored 350 cc machine. In 1974 the engine capacity was brought up to 497 cc. Compared to the old four-cylinder, the power of 92 hp was a considerable improvement.

At the start the engine still had a valve angle of 45°, but this was reduced to 42° and then in 1975 to 35°. The engine weighed only 55 kg and was 38 cm wide, compared to the old four-cylinder which weighed 70 kg and was 45 cm wide. In the latest version, bronze combustion chambers were used which did not deform at high temperatures. The machine received cast wheels and disc brakes and a completely closed double cradle frame that was constructed from chrome molybdenum tubes. The highest specified power was 102 hp at 14,000 rpm, but a problem for MV Agusta was the noise requirement introduced the FIM in 1976. To meet to the noise limit of 113 dB(A), silencers had to be fitted which reduced power. With muffled exhausts, the machine in its final version delivered 98 hp at 14,000 rpm.

=== Technical data 1973-1976 ===
MV Agusta 500 4C	1973-1974	1974	1975	1976
Valvetrain	DOHC with four valves per cylinder			
Engine configuration	Transverse in-line four-cylinder engine			
Engine cooling	Air cooling			
Bore	56 mm	58 mm		
Stroke	44 mm	47.2 mm		
Engine displacement	433.5 cc	498.6 cc		
Lubrication system	Wet sump			
Carburetors	4 × Dell'Orto 31 of 32 mm (depending on circuit)			
Max Power	80 bhp (60 kW) @ 14.000 rpm	92 bhp (69 kW) @ 14.000 rpm	102 bhp (76 kW) @ 14.000 rpm	98 bhp (73 kW) @ 14.000 rpm
Top speed	285 km/h (177 mph)		Unknown	290 km/h (180 mph)
Primary drive	Gears			
Clutch	Dry multi-plate			
Gears	6			
Final drive	Chain			
Frame	Double cradle			
Front forks	Telescopic fork			
Rear forks	Swingarm			
Rear suspension	Coil springs with hydraulic shock absorbers			
Brakes	Disc brakes			

=== Timeline 1973–1976 ===
1973

The new four-cylinder was introduced in 1973, but the machine was unreliable, so that the three-cylinder machine was often used. It was a difficult year for MV Agusta and especially so for Giacomo Agostini. They had attracted Phil Read as "second driver", but he did not accept that role. Moreover, the four-cylinder two-stroke Yamaha TZ 500 appeared, with which Jarno Saarinen won the first two GPs. Agostini still trusted the three-cylinder, but in the first race he was beaten by Read on the four-cylinder. In the GP of Germany, Read won after Saarinen, Kanaya (both Yamaha) and Agostini had dropped out. After the fatal accident in Monza, where Saarinen and Renzo Pasolini died, the 500 cc race was cancelled and Yamaha withdrew for the remainder of the season. As agreed, the top riders stayed away from the Isle of Man TT, meaning the next race would be in Yugoslavia. However, due to a controversial decision by team leader Magni, the MV drivers were not allowed to drive. He was not convinced of the safety of the track, which was approved by a delegation of four drivers, including Agostini. In the TT of Assen, Agostini dropped out again and Read won. Agostini won in Belgium and Czechoslovakia, but Read still had a comfortable lead in points and Ago was behind Kim Newcombe and Jack Findlay in the rankings. Read became the world champion at the Grand Prix of Sweden. He had driven the new four-cylinder for most of the season.

1974

The four-cylinder was a now a considerable improvement on the three-cylinder, but in 1974 there was much more competition. Yamaha now had the updated YZR 500 factory racer, but a whole fleet of TZ 500 production racers also appeared. In addition, Barry Sheene, Paul Smart and Jack Findlay launched the new Suzuki RG 500. Agostini had switched to Yamaha. Gianfranco Bonera partnered Phil Read at MV Agusta. Bonera, however, was primarily responsible for winning the Italian championship title. MV Agusta stopped the 350cc class early in the season, allowing them to concentrate fully on the 500cc class. In the season opening French GP, for the first time in years, there was a battle between three brands, which was won by Phil Read after Agostini dropped out. The top drivers boycott the Grand Prix of Germany. In Assen, three brands were on the first row: Yamaha (Teuvo Länsivuori and Giacomo Agostini), MV Agusta (Phil Read) and Suzuki (Barry Sheene). Agostini won this race, but in Belgium he was again second behind Read. There he drove the new YZR 500, but the MV Agusta was also new and finally had a fully-fledged 500cc engine. Due to falls in Sweden, Agostini and Sheene lost their chance for the world title. Phil Read came second there, but his win at the Grand Prix of Finland clinched the world title for MV Agusta again. Bonera finished second in the final ranking of the world championship.

1975

Although they had obtained the first two places in the previous year's world championship, the opposition for the MV Agustas was becoming stronger. The FIM had committed to long races. The two-stroke machines had to make fuel stops or mount larger, heavier tanks which favored the MV Agusta four-stroke. Read was not at all satisfied with the handling of the four-cylinder engine and Gianfranco Bonera broke a leg during the preseason and had to be replaced by Armando Toracca. Giacomo Agostini, sought rapprochement with the MV team, but was still employed by Yamaha. Toracca disliked "second driver" status and forced Read to fight for third place in the opening race, causing them to lose a lot of time to Agostini and Kanaya with their Yamahas. In Austria, Read was only third behind Kanaya and Länsivuori (Suzuki). On the Hockenheim circuit, pure speed was important and as a result Read was able to compete with Agostini, but Agostini won. In Imola, Read had no chance against Agostini and in Assen he was only third. In Belgium, another speed circuit, Read won. Moreover, Agostini dropped out, as did the now fit Bonera and Barry Sheene. Read became second behind Sheene in Sweden but dropped out in Finland. As a result, the world title battle was still open at the start of the last GP (Czechoslovakia). Agostini had to make a fuel stop and Read won the race, but Agostini's second place was enough for him to clinch the world title.

1976

In 1976, Agostini returned to MV Agusta, but not with a usual factory contract. The MV Agustas were delivered to the "Marlboro-Api Racing Team", but with support of the entire team of factory engineers supporting at races. The FIM introduced the new noise standard of 113 dB(A) and the MV struggled to meet it. Agostini used a Suzuki RG 500 after the second race. Only in the last race of the season in Germany did the MV Agusta appear again, now equipped with lighter pistons and a lighter crankshaft. Agostini won the race with it in difficult conditions. Nevertheless, MV Agusta announced at the end of the year that it would stop road racing.

== Prototypes ==
=== MV Agusta 500 6C 1957–1958 ===
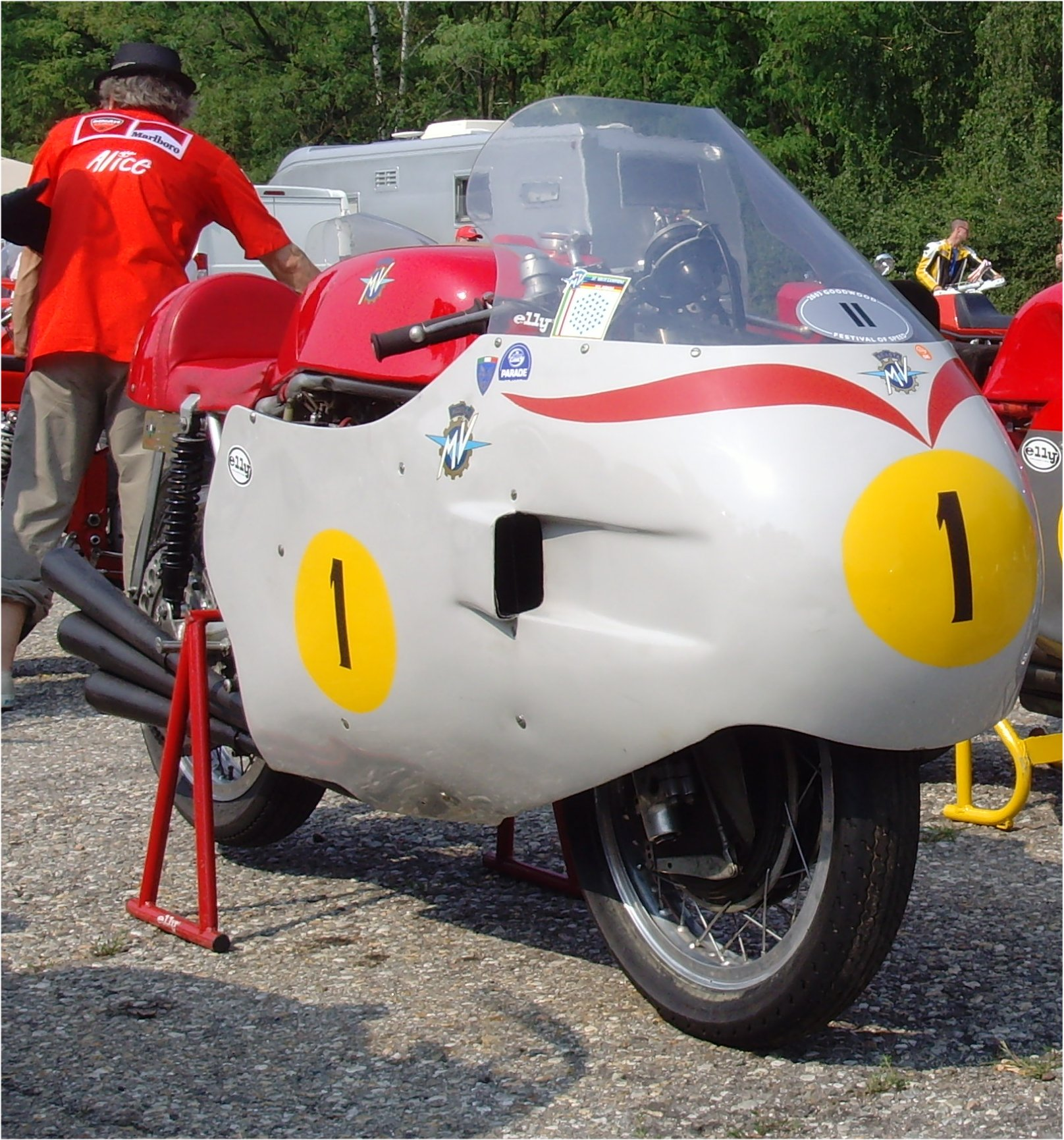
MV Agusta 500 GP 6 Cilindri prototype

The four-cylinder MV Agusta was noncompetitive against the Gileras in 1957 and in practice for the last race of 1957, Monza, Nello Pagani appeared with a completely new machine: a six-cylinder in-line engine. MV Agusta built the engine in response to the Moto Guzzi Otto Cilindri. The machine provided enough power, but this did not outweigh the additional weight. Pagani did not start the machine in the race. John Hartle raced the machine at Monza the following year but retired. When Moto Guzzi and Gilera withdrew from the road race, further development of the six-cylinder engine was no longer necessary. Only one of the MV Agusta 500 6C was built.

The air-cooled six-cylinder engine still had double overhead camshafts and a double cradle frame, the lower tubes of which could be dismantled for easy removal of the engine. It delivered around 75 hp at 15,000 rpm and weighed 145 kg.

=== MV Agusta 500 4C Boxer 1975–1976 ===
In 1975 Arturo Magni started working on a completely new engine together with engineers Mazza and Bocchi. Bocchi came from Ferrari and constructed a four-cylinder boxer engine with water cooling. The engine did not go beyond the prototype stage and was never tested on a circuit. The cylinder sizes (bore and stroke) were the same as those of the in-line engine and the engine immediately delivered a corresponding power of 106 to 108 hp (without noise reduction). It was a transverse engine, with two cylinders at the front and two at the rear. In 1977 the motorcycle was photographed in a frame, but this motorcycle was certainly not roadworthy.

=== Technical data prototypes ===
MV Agusta	500 6C	500 4C Boxer
Years	1957-1958	1975-1976
Category	Prototype	
Valvetrain	DOHC with two valves per cylinder	DOHC with four valves per cylinder
Engine configuration	Four-stroke transverse in-line six-cylinder engine	Four-stroke transverse flat four-cylinder engine
Engine cooling	Air cooling	Water cooling
Bore	48 mm	57 mm
Stroke	46 mm	49 mm
Engine displacement	499 cc	500 cc
Lubrication system	Wet-sump	
Carburettors	Unknown	
Max power	75 bhp (56 kW) @ 15.000 rpm	106-108 bhp (78-79 kW)
Top speed	240 km/h (150 mph)	Unknown
Primary drive	Gears	
Clutch	Wet multi-plate	Dry multi-plate
Gears	7	6
Final drive	Chain drive	
Frame	Double cradle	Trellis
Front forks	Telescopic fork	
Rear forks	Swingarm	
Rear suspension	Coil springs with hydraulic shock absorbers	
Brakes	Drum brakes	Disc brakes

== Bibliography ==
- Bula, Maurice (1975). Grand Prix motorcycle championships of the world. Foulis. ISBN 978-0854292080.
- Büla, Maurice; Schertenleib, Jean-Claude (2001). Continental Circus. 1949-2000, édition trilingue français-anglais-allemand. Chronosports. ISBN 9782940125326.
- Chamberlain, Peter, ed. (1951). Motor Cycling Sports Yearbook 1951. Temple Press Ltd.
- Chamberlain, Peter, ed. (1952). Motor Cycling Sports Yearbook 1952. Temple Press Ltd.
- Chamberlain, Peter, ed. (1953). Motor Cycling Sports Yearbook 1953. Temple Press Ltd.
- Cook, R.A.B., ed. (1956). Motor Cycling Sports Yearbook 1956. Temple Press Ltd.
- Cook, R.A.B., ed. (1957). Motor Cycling Sports Yearbook 1957. Temple Press Ltd.
- Cook, R.A.B., ed. (1961). Motor Cycling Sports Yearbook 1961. Temple Press Ltd.
- Noyes, Dennis; Scott, Michael (1999). Motocourse: 50 Years Of Moto Grand Prix. Hazleton Publishing Ltd. ISBN 1-874557-83-7.
- Smith, Robert (January–February 2013). "Last of the Breed: MV Agusta 850SS". Motorcycle Classics. 8 (3).
- Tragatsch, Erwin (1992). Illustrated Encyclopedia of Motorcycles. Book Sales. ISBN 9780890098684.
- Walker, Mick (1998). Mick Walker's Italian Racing Motorcycles. Redline Books. ISBN 9780953131112.
