= Arciso Artesiani =

Italian motorcycle racer (1922–2005)

- Nationality: Italian
- Born: 21 January 1922; Marzabotto, Emilia-Romagna, Italy
- Died: 16 March 2005 (aged 83)
Motorcycle racing career statistics
Grand Prix motorcycle racing
Active years	1949 - 1951
First race	1949 500cc Swiss Grand Prix
Last race	1951 500cc Spanish Grand Prix
Team	MV Agusta
Starts / Wins / Podiums / Poles / F. laps / Points; 7 / 0 / 6 / N/A / 1 / 35

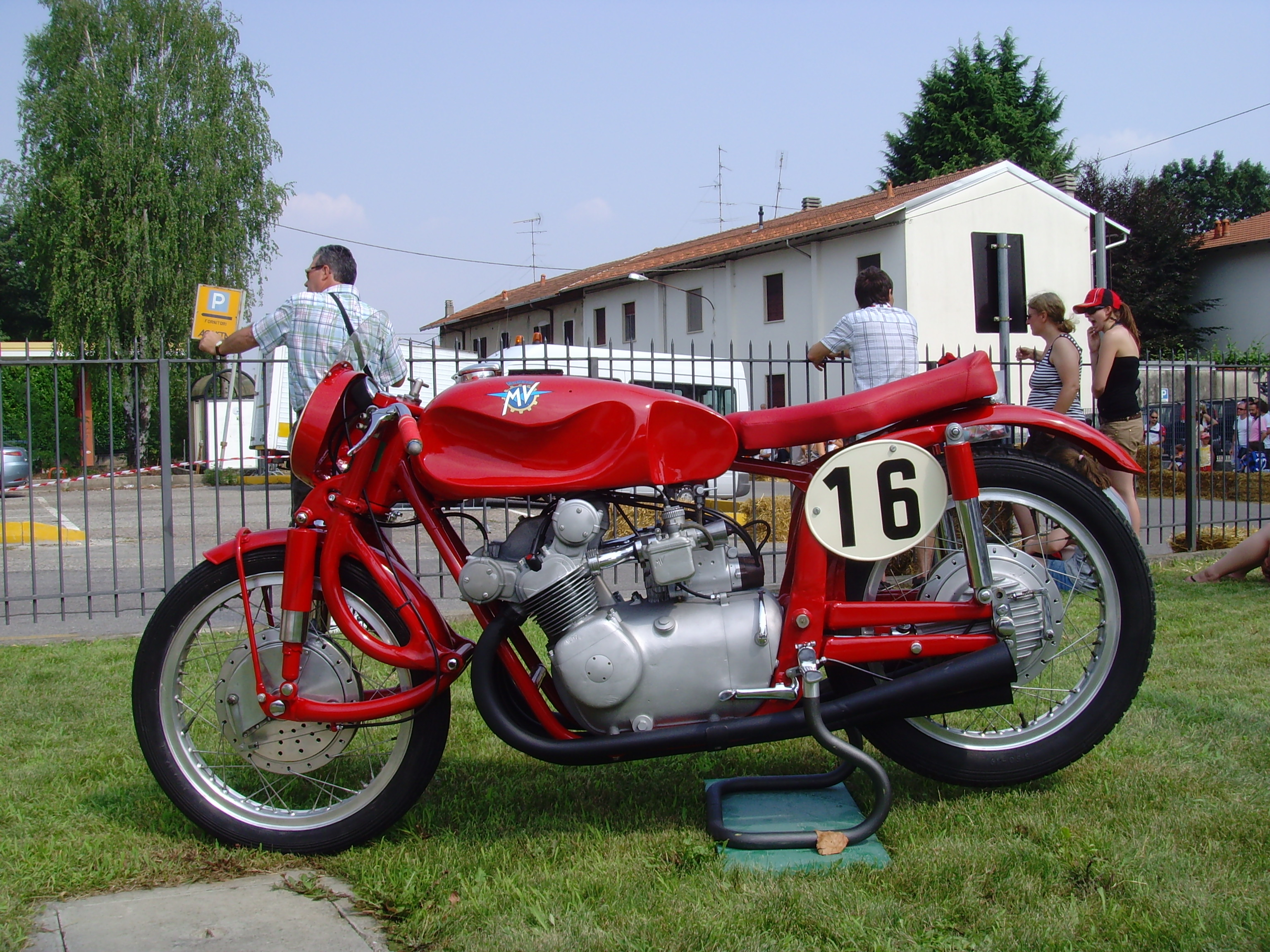
MV Agusta 500 racing, 1951, designed by Pietro Remor

Arciso Artesiani (21 January 1922 – 16 March 2005) was an Italian professional Grand Prix motorcycle road racer.

Born in Marzabotto, Emilia-Romagna, Artesiani competed from 1949 to 1951 riding a 500cc motorcycle for MV Agusta. In 1949, Artesiani finished the 500cc season in third place behind Leslie Graham and Nello Pagani.

== Placement in Motorcycle World Championship ==
Season	Class	Result	Machine	Podium
1949	500 cm^{3}	3.	Gilera	4
1950	500 cm^{3}	8.	MV Agusta	1
1951	500 cm^{3}	13.	MV Agusta	1
