= Piero Remor =

Italian motorcycle engineer

- Born: 1898; Porto Venere, Italy
- Died: 1964 (aged 67–68); Rome, Italy
- Occupation: Motorcycle designer
- Known for: Gilera 400/4, MV Agusta 500/4, MV Agusta 125 Bialbero

Piero Remor (Porto Venere, Italy, 1896 - Rome, 1964) was an Italian engineer and motorcycle constructor, best known for his work for the Gilera and MV Agusta brands.

== MAS boot ==
Piero Remor studied at the Sapienza University of Rome, with, among others professor Ugo Bordoni. After graduating, he worked with Bordoni in 1919 on the development of the Motoscafo Armato Silurante, a MAS-boot (torpedo boat).

== GRB-OPRA ==
In 1923, together with Carlo Gianini, Remor built a transverse inline four-cylinder engine for a motorcycle. This project caught the attention of Count Luigi Bonmartini who owned the Officine di Precisione Romane Automobilistiche (OPRA) company in Rome. Bonmartini decided to provide financial support by establishing a new company together with Remor and Gianini. This company was initially named "GRB" (Gianini, Remor, Bonmartini). To earn money, however, work also had to be carried out for the aviation industry and it took five years for a prototype of a motorcycle to be built. This was an air cooled four-cylinder with probably a water-cooled cylinder head that was built in a very simple frame. In 1929 the prototype was now called "OPRA" and Piero Taruffi. made a name for himself with Nortons as a motorcycle racer, was hired as a test driver. However, when the OPRA entered its first race, the Grand Prix of Rome, it was driven by a then more famous driver, Umberto Faraglia. The OPRA led the race for a short time, but the engine blew up. Taruffi, disappointed because he had been passed for the ride, won th race with his Norton. Piero Remor left the OPRA company in 1930 after a dispute with Count Bonmartini.

=== Development of the racing engine ===
Meanwhile, Piero Taruffi and Carlo Gianini continued to develop the motorcycle, which in the meantime was called "CNA Rondine", after another company from Bonmartini, Compagnia Nazionale Aeronautica, and the Rondine aeroplane that flew over the 1922 March on Rome. The developments there were again particularly slow, but it was not until 1934 that the motorcycle came back onto the track under the name "Rondine" (swallow). The engine, which was completely revised only by Gianini, was now completely water-cooled and a Roots supercharger. Six copies of the Rondine were built. Taruffi and Amilcare Rossetti rode the machines in the prestigious Grand Prix of Tripoli, where they came first and second. Taruffi drove a fully streamlined version to a record 244.6 km/h. In 1934 Bonmartini sold CNA to the aircraft manufacturer Caproni in Milan. That company had no interest in the Rondine and Piero Taruffi feared that his project, in which he had been involved for eight years, would be lost. That is why he approached Giuseppe Gilera, who was convinced of the advertising aspect of road races for his Gilera brand. Gilera bought the six machines, drawings, rights, spare parts and hired Taruffi as rider, team leader and chief engineer. However, Gilera also saw the weaknesses of the machine and the need to have it developed further before it was used in races.

== Officine Meccaniche ==
After leaving OPRA, Remor joined the Officine Meccaniche (OM) car factory in Brescia. There he designed the 1500cc four-cylinder engine for the "Typo M". When Fiat took over the OM brand in 1938 and ceased car production in favour of the production of trucks, Piero Remor started looking for other work.

== Gilera ==
In 1939 Taruffi persuaded Remor to join Gilera to further develop the 500cc Rondine, but Piero Remor began developing a 250cc four-cylinder machine with a supercharger and the rear suspension of the Rondine. Due to the outbreak of the Second World War, all developments for racing came to a halt. In 1946, the FIM prohibited the use of superchargers, forcing Gilera to use the single-cylinder Saturno Competizione as the factory racer. It was no match for machines such as the Moto Guzzi Bicilindrica 500, the Moto Guzzi Gambalunga, the Norton Manx and the AJS Porcupine. In that year, Gilera commissioned Piero Remor to develop a new racer. Piero Taruffi had left the company to focus on his career as a racing driver. Remor did not start from the 500 cc Rondine, but enlarged his own 1940 250 cc prototype to 500 cc. In 1947, the Gilera 500 4C began to take shape and in 1948 the first tests were carried out by Carlo Bandirola and Massimo Masserini on the Milan-Bergamo motorway. There were major problems with lubrication and a lot of time was needed to resolve them. In 1948, Nello Pagani rode the machine in its first race in Cesena, but retired due to poor handling. Remor was not happy with that, but the fact is that the machine couldn't break points that year. Even winning the Italian championship was not achievable. Masserini led the Assen TT, but fell in the heavy rain. Only the last race of the year, the Grand Prix of Italy, was won by Masserini, mainly because Norton and AJS did not enter. Although it was clear to everyone that the steering behaviour was below par, Remor refused to improve the machine. The fight with Pagani was intense that Remor forbade him to ride on the four-cylinder machine forcing him to use the Saturno. In the 1949 World Championship it became clear that the handling of the Gilera was not good. The first world title went to Les Graham with the AJS Porcupine, a machine that weighed around 140 kg and delivered only 45 bhp, while the Gilera weighed 124 kg and had over 50 hp. After two races, Giuseppe Gilera intervened and Pagani got the four-cylinder for the Assen TT, with which he easily won. With a win at the Grand Prix of Italy, Gilera had only won two races in the first world championship year with a motorcycle that was the best on paper.

At the end of the 1949 season Piero Remor had to leave Gilera because most riders were unable to work with him. The initial difficulties in resolving lubrication problems and his refusal to correct bad steering behaviour or even to acknowledge that it existed were no longer acceptable.

=== Relationships with riders ===
Piero Remor always had a difficult relationship with his riders, because they blamed each other when results were disappointing:

- Nello Pagani complained about the steering qualities of the Gilera 500 4C. In 1948 he even retired from a race because of the bad handling. Remor refused to improve the machine and forbade Pagani to ride the four-cylinder machine. In 1949, Giuseppe Gilera intervened personally: he gave Pagani the four-cylinder and fired Remor.
- Arciso Artesiani, according to the Italian press, was blamed by his employer Gilera for not having won the constructor's title in 1949. According to Artesiani this was the fault of Piero Remor, who during the Ulster Grand Prix only had part of the engine oil changed to save time, which caused the engine to seize.

== MV Agusta ==
Count Domenico Agusta was determined to make MV Agusta one of the leading motorcycle marques. In 1950 Augusta hired Pietro Remor to build two GP machines: a four-cylinder 500 cc and a DOHC 125 cc. MV Agusta was still racing in the 125 cc class with a two-stroke engine, which was not competitive with the four-strokes of Mondial and Morini. For MV Agusta, the 125cc Bialbero became the first racing engine that was not derived from a production model. On his departure from Gilera, Remor took the blueprints of the 500/4 engine with him. These provided the basis for MV Agusta's new 500cc four-cylinder machine, the MV Agusta 500 4C. From drawing board to test track it only took 15 weeks, but that was not surprising because the engine was almost identical to the Gilera 500 4C. MV Agusta and Gilera thus competed in the 1950 Championship with almost the same motorcycles, something that Gilera were not happy with. When driver Arciso Artesiani also left for MV Agusta, they even spoke of "betrayal". However, Artesiani did not have much choice. He was an MV Agusta dealer in Bologna and received a generous salary of 800,000 lire and a motorcycle. The MV Agusta 500 4C was presented during the trade fair at Milan in 1950. The main difference with the Gilera 500 4C was the shaft drive of the MV. at the front was a chrome-molybdenum Girder fork and in the back was a double swinging arm with torsion springs and friction dampers. The engine block was also not exactly the same as that of the Gilera: with the MV Agusta the cylinder heads could be removed whereas on the Gilera they were cast in one piece with the cylinder block. On 1 May 1950, engineer Arturo Magni also came to MV Agusta and became responsible for the further development of the racing engine. Magni had previously worked with Remor at Gilera.

== Motom ==
After leaving MV Agusta at the end of 1953, Piero Remor worked at Motom, which manufactured mopeds and light motorcycles, from 1954 to 1957. Whilst at Motom, he developed the small Motom 98T. He later became a consultant and died in Rome in 1964.

== Bibliography ==
- Cameron, Kevin (2009). Top Dead Center 2: Racing and Wrenching with Cycle World's Kevin Cameron. Motorbooks. ISBN 9780760336083.
- Pullen, Greg (2018). A-Z of Italian Motorcycle Manufacturers. The Crowood Press. ISBN 9781785004889.
- Richardson, Matthew (2018). TT Titans: The Twenty-Five Greatest Isle of Man Racing Machines. Pen and Sword. ISBN 9781526710246.
- Walker, Mick (1998). Mick Walker's Italian Racing Motorcycles. Redline Books. ISBN 9780953131112.
