= MV Agusta 125 Bialbero =

Italian motorcycle

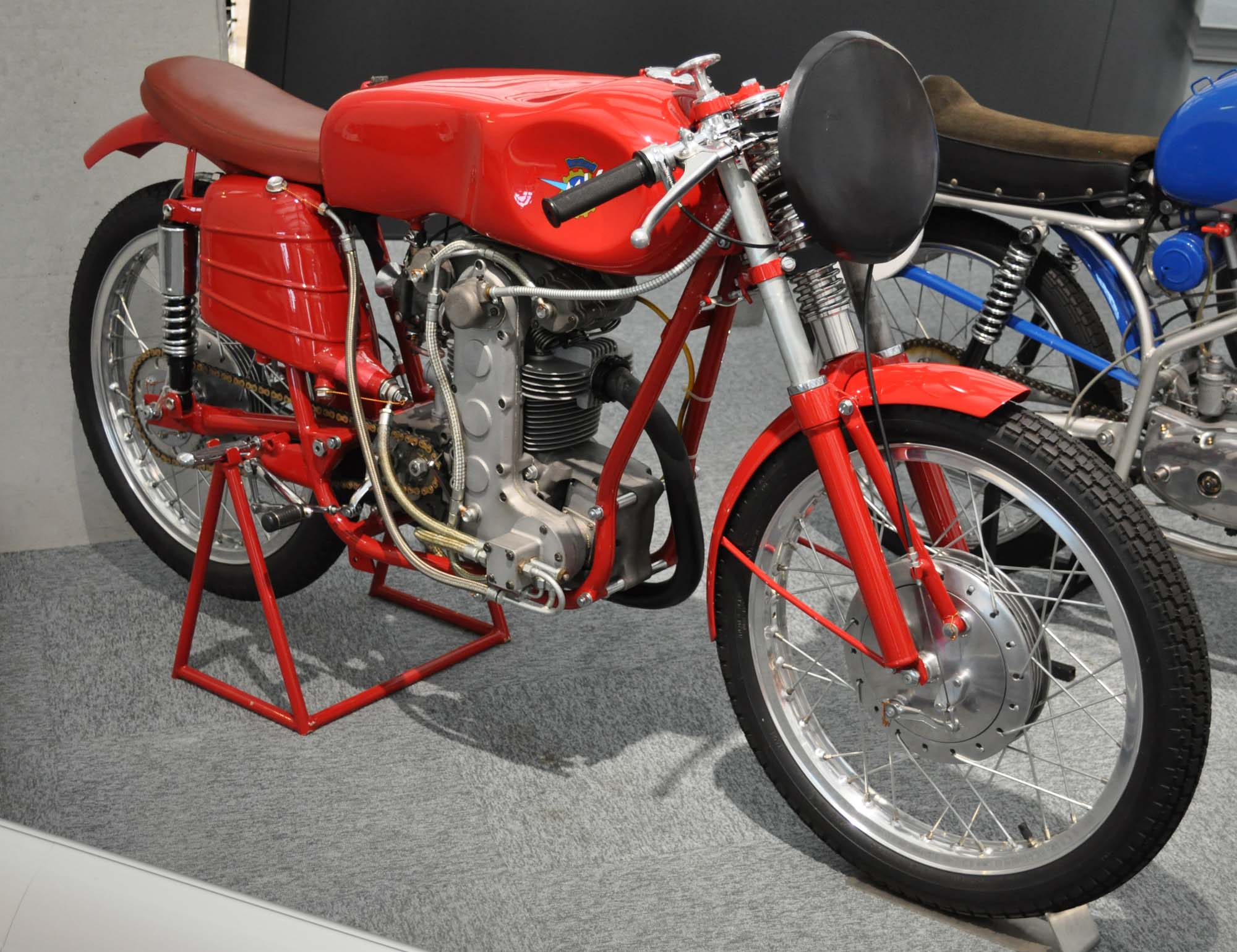
- 1953 MV Agusta 125 Bialbero
- Manufacturer: MV Agusta
- Production: 1950–1960
- Class: Factory racer
- Engine: 125 cc Four-stroke DOHC single-cylinder

The MV Agusta 125 Bialbero was a 125 cc factory racer from the Italian brand MV Agusta, which was produced between 1950 and 1960. The machine won 34 GPs, 6 rider's championships, and one manufacturer's championship. The machine also won 4 Italian championships and 10 national championships in other countries.

== History ==
In 1949, Domenico Agusta employed Piero Remor and Arturo Magni, who had worked for Gilera until that time, and were responsible for the four-cylinder Gilera 500 4C. Remor brought great knowledge of the Gilera with it, and MV Agusta was able to profit well in the development of the MV Agusta 500 4C, but the first assignment for Remor was to make a 125 cc four-stroke engine.

== Technology ==
The name "Bialbero" means "two camshafts". It was clear at that time that the lightweight models would need two camshafts. The MV Agusta Bialbero 125 engine even resembled the Benelli 250 cc racer from before the Second World War.

The engine was an air-cooled single-cylinder four-stroke with double overhead camshafts (DOHC) powered by a gear train. The valves were at an angle of 90° to each other and were closed by external hairpin springs. The valve diameter of the final model in 1960 was 34 mm for the inlet and 32 mm for the exhaust. The bore and stroke was 53 × 56 mm and the displacement 123.54 cc. These sizes corresponded to those of the Mondial 125 Bialbero and not, as one would expect, the Gilera 500 4C. In 1960 the compression ratio was 11:1. The oil tank of the dry sump system was initially in the conventional location under the tank, but was moved to the front part of the petrol tank in the mid-1950s. The ignition was provided by a magneto until 1954, but from 1955 double ignition coils were used, with a rocker switch to switch from one to the other. The power increased from around 12 hp in 1950 to around 20 hp in 1960.

The Dry multi-plate clutch was driven by gears from the crankshaft. There was initially a four-speed gearbox, but in 1955 the number of gears was expanded to seven. The rear wheel was driven by a chain.

The MV Agusta had a double cradle frame that was constructed from chrome molybdenum tubes with a diameter of 25 × 1.2 mm. Initially there were girder forks and sometimes Earles forks, but on later versions telescopic forks were used. At the rear there was a swinging arm with friction dampers, but these were replaced around 1954 by normal spring/damper elements with hydraulic shock absorbers.

== Technical details ==
MV Agusta 125 Bialbero	1950	1951	1952	1953	1954	1955	1956	1957	1958	1959	1960
Valvetrain	DOHC with two valves per cylinder										
Engine configuration	Four-stroke single-cylinder										
Engine cooling	Air cooling										
Bore	53 mm										
Stroke	56 mm										
Engine displacement	123,5 cc										
Compression ratio	Unknown										11:1
Lubrication system	Dry sump										
Max power	12 bhp (8.9 kW) @ 12.000 rpm	Unknown	15 bhp (11 kW) @ 10.800 rpm	Unknown			18.5 bhp (13.8 kW) @ 12.000 rpm	Unknown		20 bhp (15 kW) @ 12.000 rpm	
Top speed	Unknown		90 mph (140 km/h)	Unknown			115 mph (185 km/h)	Unknown		120 mph (190 km/h)	
Primary drive	Gear										
Clutch	Dry multi-plate										
Gears	4	5				7					
Final drive	Chain drive										
Frame	Double cradle										
Front forks	Girder forks		Earles forks or Telescopic forks		Telescopic forks						
Rear suspension	Swinging arm with friction dampers	Unknown			Swinging arm with hydraulic shock absorbers						
Brakes	Drum brakes										
Dry weight	Unknown		76 kg	Unknown			80 kg				

== Timeline ==
1949

Design of the new machine starts.

1950

The machine debuts at the Dutch GP in July.

1951

In 1951, Leslie Graham used the machine in two races. He dropped out of the Ultra Lightweight IOM TT and finished third at the Dutch TT as Assen. He finished eighth in the 125 cc World Championship.

1952

Graham was to concentrate on the 500 cc class in 1951. Domenico Agusta decided that he needed British drivers for the World Championship, as they would know the Mountain Course at the Isle of Man and the Clady Circuit in Northern Ireland, and signed Cecil Sandford for the 125 cc class. Sandford was still young and inexperienced in World Championship races, but had been riding in the Isle of Man since 1948; in the Clubmans Junior TT, the Manx Grand Prix, the Senior TT and the Junior TT.

Sandford won the Ultra-Lightweight TT, the Assen TT and the Ulster Grand Prix and finished third in Germany and Spain. Sandford had set a new lap record at the Isle of Man. The 1952 machine weighed only 76 kg and output had been increased to 15 bhp. Sandford won the 125 cc World Championship and MV Agusta the Constructors Championship.

1953

In 1953, MV Agusta supplied a simpler version of the 125 cc racer, the MV Agusta 125 Monoalbero with only one overhead camshaft for private drivers. That machine immediately became popular, meaning that no fewer than eleven MVs were at the start of the Isle of Man TT. Les Graham won the Lightweight 125 cc TT on the Island, but in the Senior TT, he lost control of his bike at high speed, as he took the rise after the bottom of Bray Hill, and was killed instantly. Sandford finished third and Carlo Ubbiali, who joined MV from Mondial, retired from the race. Ubbiali won in Germany, and Angelo Copeta, on an MV, won the final race of the season in Spain. Sandford, Ubbiali, Copeta and Graham finished the season second, third, four and fifth in the World Championship. MV Agusta again won the constructor's title.

1954

The NSU Rennfox was unbeatable in the hands of Rupert Hollaus in 1954 Grand Prix motorcycle racing season. Hollaus won the first four GPs. Carlo Ubbiali was second in the Lightweight 125 cc TT, but dropped out in the Ulster Grand Prix. When Hollaus died during practice for the Nations motorcycle Grand Prix in Monza, NSU withdrew from racing. In Monza, Ubbiali finished third and those four points were enough to gain second place in the world championship.

1955

After the loss of NSU, MV Agusta were able to dominate the 125 cc class in 1955. MV won all of the GPs that season. Luigi Taveri won the season opener in Spain, and Ubbiali the remainder. The first three places in the world championship were for MV riders: Ubbiali, Taveri and Remo Venturi, and MV won the manufacturers title.

An over-bored version of the machine, the MV Agusta 175 Bialbero, was produced for use in the Italian 175 cc Championship, a popular series at the time.

1956

MV Agusta faced stiffer competition in the 1956 season. The new Gilera 125 GP, on which Romolo Ferri regularly put in strong performances, and also the Mondial 125 Bialbero with the rising star Tarquinio Provini. Ubbiali won five of the six GPs and became Champion, teammates Taveri and Fortunato Libanori finished third and fifth. MV again won the constructor's title.

1957

The Mondial had been developed to produce 18 bhp in 1957, but Ubbiali started the season well with a victory at the Hockenheimring, however, the fastest lap was set by Mondial driver Provini. In the following three GPs (Ultra-Lightweight TT, Dutch TT and Belgian GP) Provini won. Taveri won in Ulster and Ubbiali at Monza. Ubbiali finished second in the Championship and Taveri third.

1958

At the end of 1957 the major Italian brands Gilera, FB Mondial, Moto Guzzi and MV Agusta announced that they would end racing activities. The high costs were not in proportion to sales and the sport had become far too expensive. Count Agusta however reversed this decision and continued racing activities. For the 1958 season, the MV Agusta the 125 cc riders were Carlo Ubbiali and Tarquinio Provini. Ducati had entered the class with Alberto Gandossi and Luigi Taveri.

Ubbiali won the Lightweight TT and at Assen. The first win for the Ducati came at Spa. Following a win in Germany for Ubbiali, Ducati brought a new machine for the Swedish GP. Fabio Taglioni had built a fast four-stroke single-cylinder engine with three overhead camshafts. The third camshaft was needed for the desmodromic valve control. The 125 Desmo Ducati was an immediate success: the young rider Alberto Gandossi won comfortably. Gandossi fell at Ulster, allowing Ubbiali to win. Bruno Spaggiari, on a Ducati, took victory in the final round at Monza. Ubbiali won the Championship, with Provini forth. MV won the constructor's title.

1959

MV Agusta dominated the 1959 season. Provini won in the Isle of Man and Sweden. Ubbiali won in Germany, Assen and Spa. This was enough for Ubbiali to win the title, so the team did not travel to the Ulster Grand Prix. MV Agusta would have liked to win in the home race in Monza, but Ernst Degner very surprisingly won on the MZ RE 125 with a two-stroke engine. Ubbiali won the title, Provini was second, and again MV won the constructor's title.

1960

Honda entered the 125 cc for the 1960 season. The MV Agusta 125 Bialbero now delivered 20 bhp and reached a top speed of 120 mph (200 kmh), but the Honda RC143 delivered 23 bhp. It had a two-cylinder engine that was rapidly developed, but was still slower than the MV Agusta and the MZ RE 125. Ubbiali won four of the five GPs and was crowned champion, with teammate Gary Hocking second.

1960 was the final year for the MV Agusta 125 Bialbero. The cost of racing for MV Agusta had become very high: A lot of money was invested in the 350 and 500 cc racers. Agusta decided not to compete in the 125cc class again.

== Bibliography ==
- Büla, Maurice; Schertenleib, Jean-Claude (2001). Continental Circus 1949-2000 (in French). Chronosports. ISBN 9782940125760.
- Chamberlain, Peter, ed. (1952). Motor Cycling Yearbook 1952. Temple Press Ltd. pp. 111–112.
- Chamberlain, Peter, ed. (1953). Motor Cycling Sports Yearbook 1953. Temple Press Ltd. p. 123.
- Colombo, Mario; Patrignani, Roberto (2000). MV Agusta (in German) (Aufl ed.). Motorbuch-Verl. ISBN 978-3613014169.
- Cook, R. A. B., ed. (1956). Motor Cycling Sports Yearbook 1956. Temple Press Ltd. p. 173.
- Falloon, Ian (2005). The Honda Story: Production and Racing Motorcycles from 1946 to the Present Day. Haynes Publishing UK. ISBN 9781859609668.
- Giulio, Decio (2001). Ducati : design in the sign of emotion. MBI Pub. Co. ISBN 978-0760311998.
- Hahn, Pat (2016). Classic Motorcycles: The Art of Speed. Motorbooks. ISBN 9780760351796.
- Noyes, Dennis; Scott, Michael (1999). Motocourse: 50 Years Of Moto Grand Prix. Hazleton Publishing Ltd. ISBN 1-874557-83-7.
- Walker, Mick (1998). Mick Walker's Italian Racing Motorcycles. Redline Books. ISBN 9780953131112.
