= MV Agusta 175 series =

Series of Italian motorcycles

MV Agusta 175
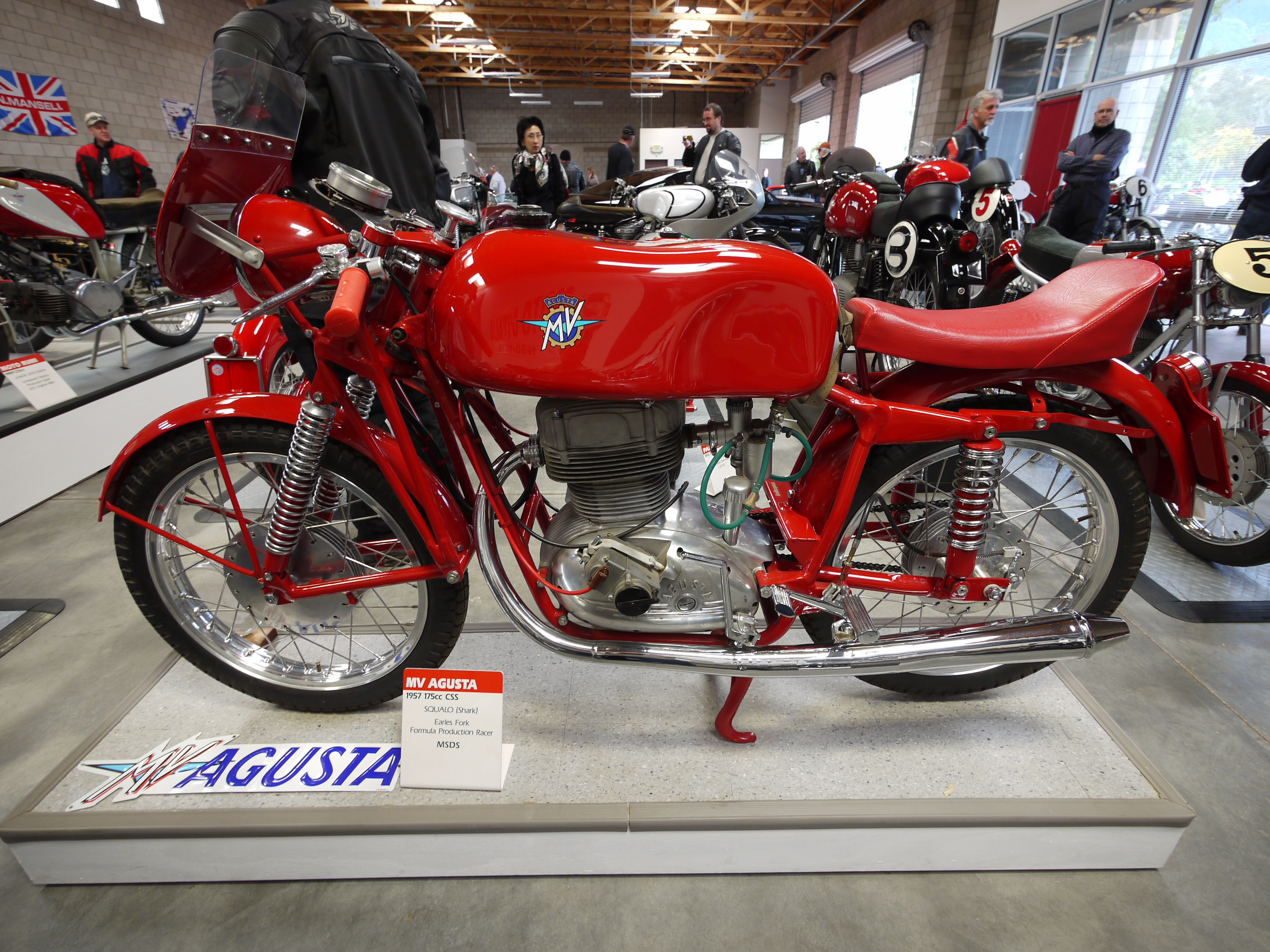
- 1957 MV Agusta 175 CSS-5V
- Manufacturer: MV Agusta
- Predecessor: 1953-1960
- Class: Touring; GT (Gran Turismo); Sports; Supersports; Production racer Racer
- Engine: 175 cc Four-stroke single-cylinder

The MV Agusta 175 were a series of motorcycles produced by the Italian manufacturer MV Agusta from 1953 to 1960. The series included touring, GT (Gran Turismo), sports and supersports models. There were also two racing variants. Because of the shape of the petrol tank, the sports and supersport models became known as the Disco Volante (Flying Saucer). The series was MV's best seller.

== Development and Technology ==
The MV Agusta 175 was launched at the EICMA (Milan Motorcycle Show) in 1952, with production starting in 1953. For MV Agusta, this motorcycle was a milestone. It was their first production machine with a four-stroke engine. The unit construction single-cylinder engine was designed with an overhead camshaft for high performance. The chain-driven camshaft operated the valves via rocker arms, which were closed by hairpin valve springs. The engine was inclined forward at 10° and manufactured in alloy and a bore and stroke of 59.5 mm × 62 mm.

The cycle parts featured an advanced duplex frame that used the engine as a stressed member, telescopic forks, a swinging arm and full-width alloy hubs.

The machine was initially available as a tourer, the 175 CST/CSTL, which produced 8 bhp (6.0 kW) at 5600 rpm. A sports model, the 175 CS, was soon introduced. This model featured a larger carburetor and produced 11 bhp (8.2 kW) at 6700 rpm, which put the machine above similar models from other manufacturers. The 15 bhp supersport model, the MV Agusta 175 CSS, was introduced at the 1954 Milan Show and, and, unlike the touring and sports versions, was fitted with Earles forks; it was priced at 280,000 lire.

A pushrod version of the engine was introduced in 1957. It was hoped that a simpler, cheaper model, albeit with less power, would appeal to a larger audience. Pushrod models had an AB suffix to the model designation.

== Model variants ==
=== 175 CST ===
The 175 CST was one of the original models produced. This touring model had a frame of a double loop design using tubes for the front sections and pressed steel members at the real. Suspension was telescopic forks at the front and a swinging arm at the rear and the wheels were 17" diameter. Separate saddles were used for the rider and passenger. The 175 cc OHC engine produced 8 bhp (6.0 kW) at 5600 rpm, giving a top speed of 60 mph (100kmh).

=== 175 CSTL ===
The 175 CSTL, also known as the Turismo Lusso, was another touring model, but had larger, 19" wheels than the CST and a "long seat" (dualseat) fitted rather than separate saddles.

=== 175 CS ===
The sports model 175 CS was introduced in 1953. It featured lower handlebars and a more sporty riding position. The engine featured a larger 22 mm carburettor and the engine produced 11 bhp (8.2 kW) at 6700 rpm, giving a 70 mph (110 km/h) top speed. About 4,500 examples of this model were made.

The Italian motorcycle fans connected the shape of the fuel tank with a "vehicle from another galaxy", which gave the MV Agusta 175 CS its nickname, Disco Volante (Flying Saucer), which was also adopted in the model history of the manufacturer.

The CS model was also produced under licence in Spain by Avello.

=== 175 CS 57 ===
An updated version on the 175 CS was introduced in 1957. The 175 CS 57 featured dynamo ignition and a revised exhaust.

=== 175 CSS ===
In July 1954, the supersport model 175 CSS was introduced. The engine was further turned from the CS model, including higher compression ratio and a larger carburettor, to produce 15 bhp (11 kW) @ 8,800 rpm. Cycle parts were the same as the CS model, except it was fitted with Earles forks. The petrol tank of the CS was retained, so this model was also known as the Disco Volante. This is the rarest model of the series, only around 500 of this model was produced.

=== 175 CSGT ===
The 175 CSGT, also known as the Turismo Monoalbero, was only manufactured in 1957. It was an upscale GT (Gran Turismo) version of the CS model. Although the engine was from the CS, the cylinder head was from the CSTL model, which reduced power.

=== AB models ===
Introduced in 1957, it was hoped that these simpler, cheaper models would appeal to a larger audience. Various trim levels were offered: Economica, Turismo, America and America Lusso. All used a pushrod version of the engine, which produced 8 bhp (6.0 kW) @ 5,200 rpm, giving a top speed of 60 mph (100kmh).

==== 235 Tevere ====
An enlarged version of the 175 AB was introduced in 1959. The pushrod engine's bore was increased to 69 mm to give a capacity of 232 cc. Except for the colour of the petrol tank, visual differences between the 175 and 235 models were minimal. Sales were slow as most buyers wanting a larger machine than 175 preferred the "full" 250 cc of the 250 Raid. Production stopped in 1961.

A variant was also manufactured under licence in Spain by Avello, where it was marketed as the 235 Deva.

== Race versions ==
=== 175 CSS-5V ===
The 175 cc Formula Sport Derivata race series was very popular in Italy. MV Agusta designed the 175 CSS-5V for this race series using the production engine. The Squalo (shark), as it was generally known, had a lighter frame based on that used on the works racers, larger brakes, a magneto, Earles forks and a five-speed gearbox. It was sold as an over the counter racer and riders such as Bob Keeler, Derek Minter and Mike Hailwood used the Squalo in national competitions. Hailwood won his first ever race on one of these machines bored out to 196 cc in a 200 cc class race at Oulton Park in 1957. Around 200 of the model were manufactured between 1954 and 1957.

A street version of the Squalo was offered fitted with headlights and mufflers.

=== 175 Bialbero ===
The 175 Bialbero was an enlarged version of the successful DOHC 125 Bialbero works racer. The bore was increased to 64 mm to give a capacity of 174 cc and had a power output of 25 bhp at 11,500 rpm. The machine was produced in response to Moto Morini and Mondial entering the 175 cc class with their racing machines.

The machine won 12 races in total, the first being by Carlo Ubbiali at the Circuit of Perugia on 22 August 1954. Umberto Masetti won the 175 cc Italian Championship in 1955 on a Bialbero. The machine was placed first and second in the 1957 Motogiro (Motorcycle Tour of Italy).

== Technical data ==
MV Agusta 175 models	CST	CSTL	CS CS 57	CSS	CSGT	AB	CSS-5V	Bialbero	235 Tevere
Year	1953-1957		1954-1958	1955-1958	1957	1957-1959	1954-1960	1954–1958	1959-1961
Valvetrain	OHC					OHV	OHC	DOHC	OHV
Engine configuration	Four-stroke single-cylinder engine								
Engine cooling	Air cooling								
Bore	59.5 mm							63 mm	69 mm
Stroke	62 mm							56 mm	62 mm
Engine displacement	172.4 cc							174.5 cc	232 cc
Lubrication system	Wet sump								
Carburetor	Dell'Orto 18 mm		Dell'Orto 22 mm	Dell'Orto 25 mm	Dell'Orto 20 mm	Dell'Orto 18 mm	Dell'Orto 25 mm		Dell'Orto 25 mm
Compression ratio	6.5:1		7:1	9:1	6.5:1		9:1	9.5:1	7.2:1
Max power	8 bhp ( kW) @ 5,200 rpm		11 bhp (8.2 kW) @ 6,700 rpm	15 bhp (11 kW) @ 6,700 rpm	8 bhp ( kW) @ 5,200 rpm		16 bhp (12 kW) @ 8,800 rpm	25 bhp (19 kW) @ 11,500 rpm	13 bhp (9.7 kW) @ 5,500 rpm
Top speed	60 mph (100 kmh)		70 mph (115 kmh)	85 mph (135 kmh)	60 mph (100 kmh)		95 mph (150 kmh)	110 mph (180 kmh)	65 mph (105 kmh)
Primary drive	Gears								
Clutch	Wet multi-plate								
Gears	4						5		4
Final drive	Chain drive								
Frame	Double cradle								
Front forks	Telescopic forks			Earles forks	Telescopic forks		Earles forks	Telescopic forks	
Rear forks	Swinging arm								
Rear suspension	Coil springs with hydraulic shock absorbers								
Brakes	Drum brakes								
No. produced	6,500	9,500	5,000	500	500	6,000	Unknown		1,000

== Gallery ==
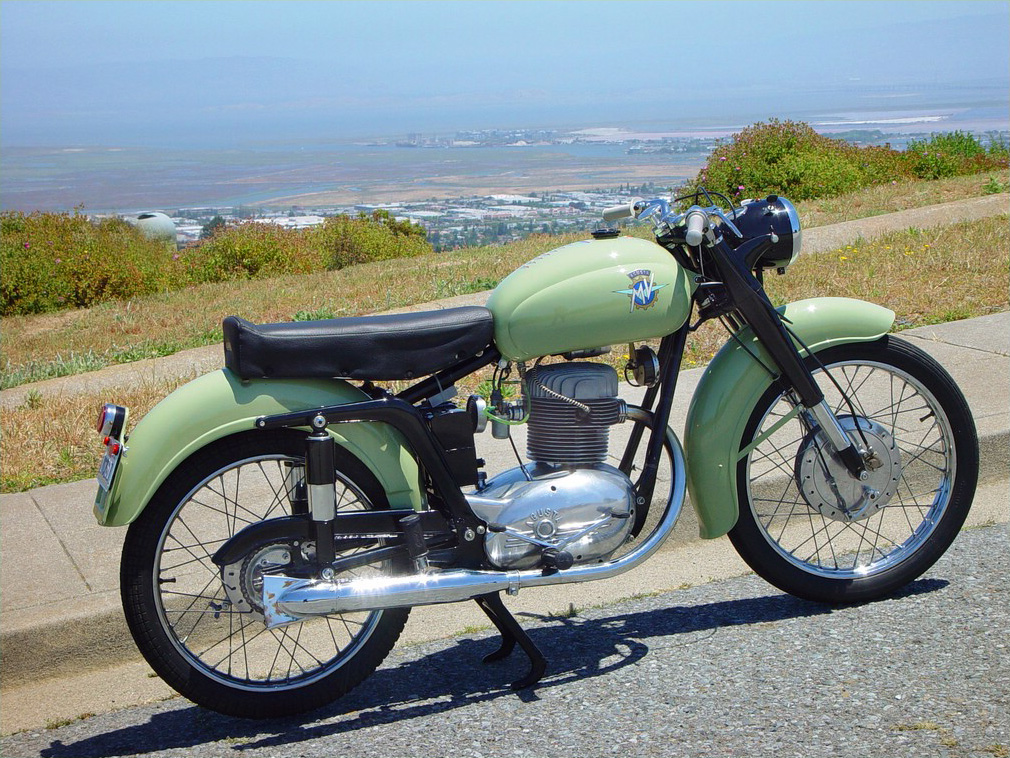
1954 MV Agusta 175 CSTL

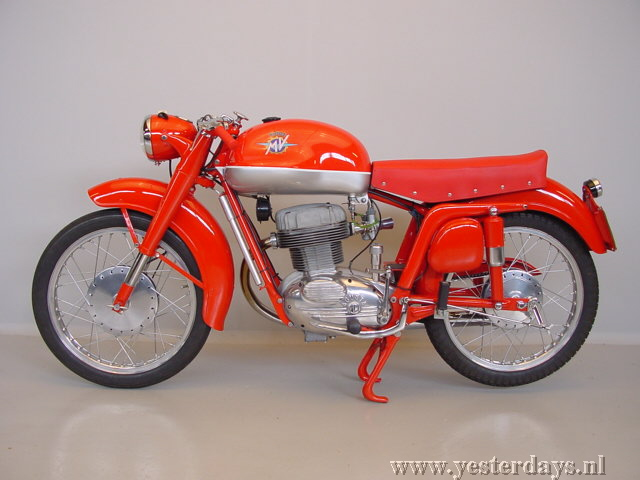
1956 MV Agusta 175 CS

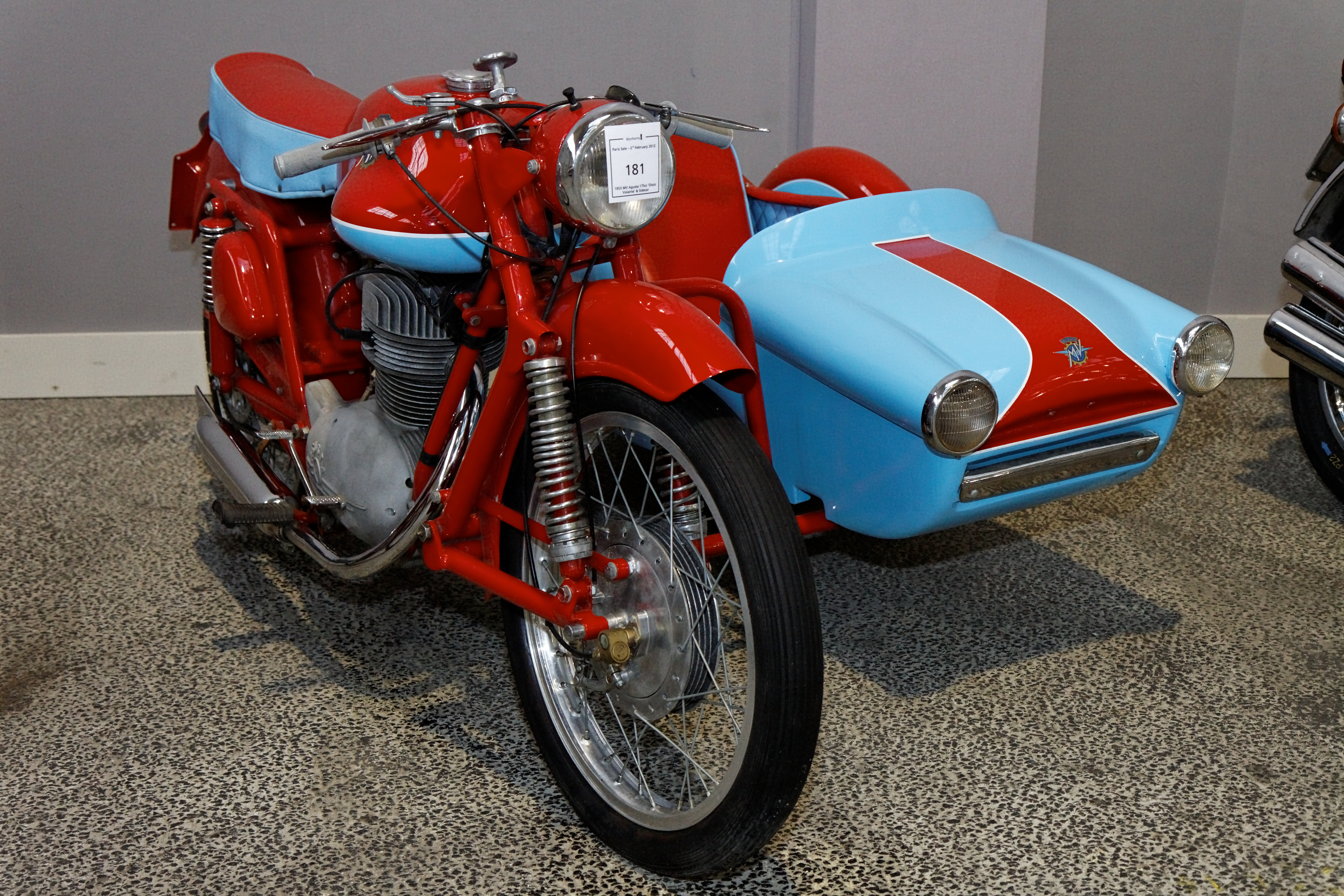
MV Agusta 175 CS & Sidecar

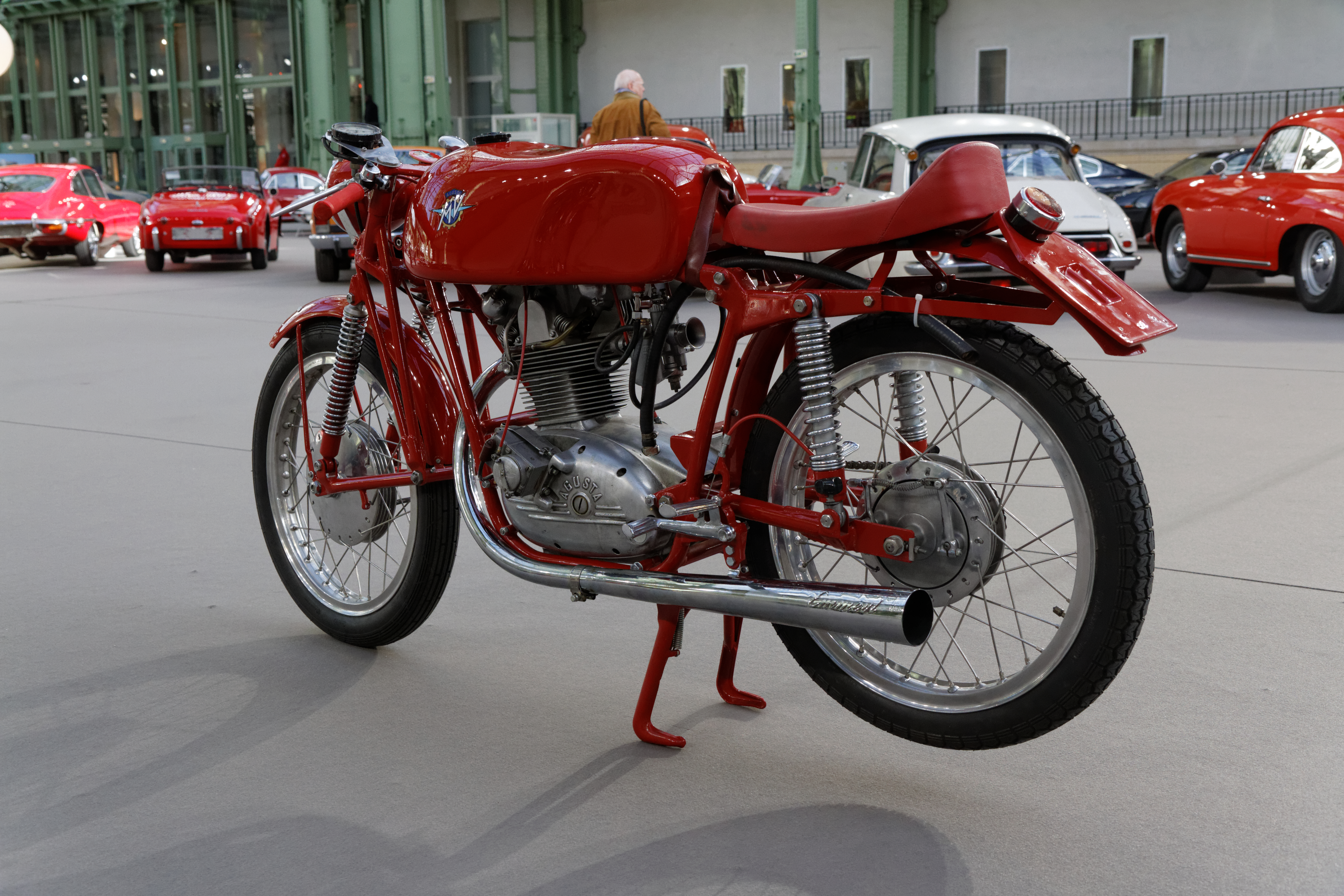
1957 MV Agusta 175 CSS-5V

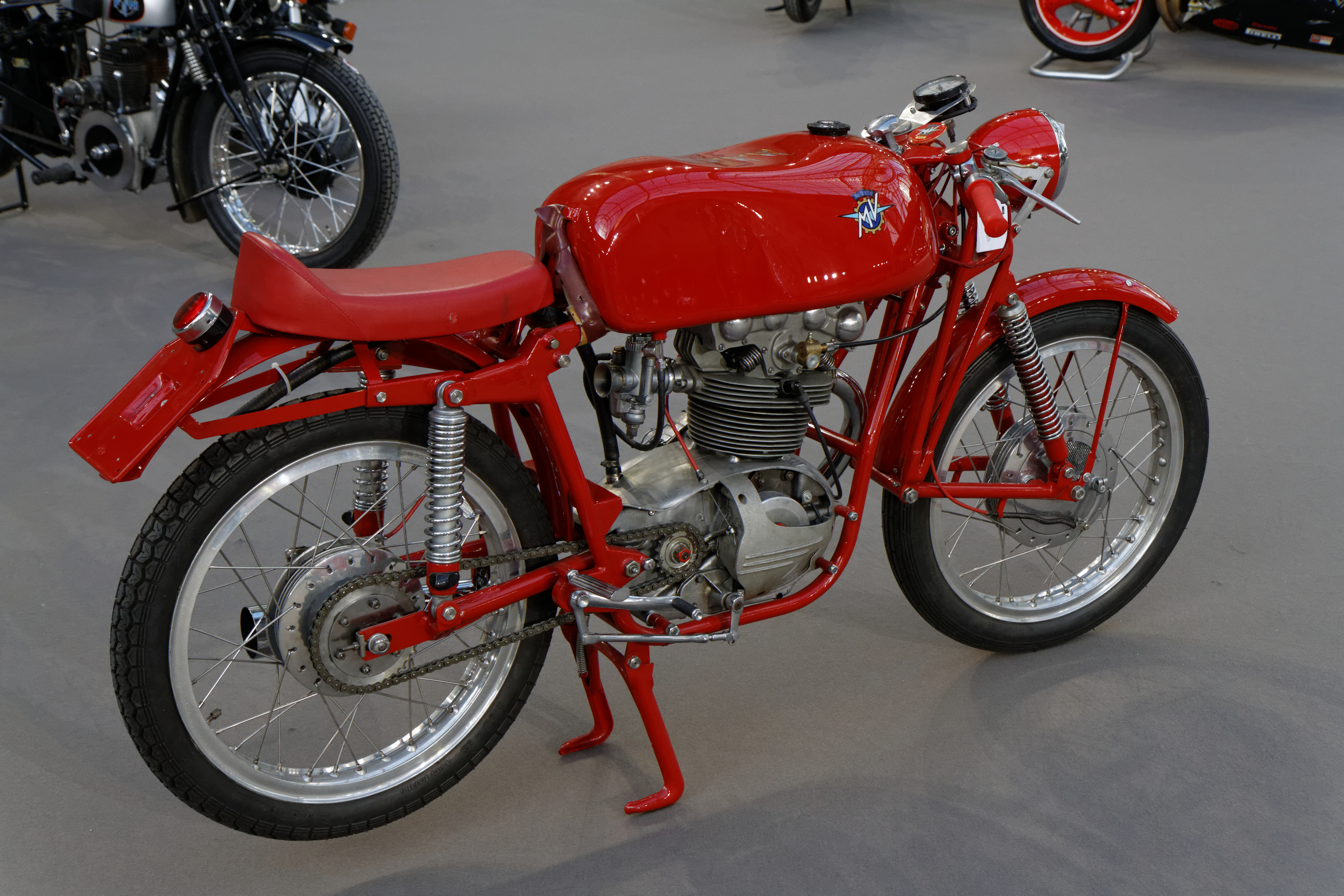
1954 MV Agusta 175 Bialbero

== Bibliography ==
- Colombo, Mario; Patrignani, Roberto (2000). MV Agusta (in German) (Aufl ed.). Motorbuch-Verl. ISBN 978-3613014169.
- Tooth, Phillip (December 2015). "MV Agusta 175 CSS" (PDF). Klassik Motorrad (6): 32–39.
