= Ducati Deluxe =

SOHC motorcycle made by MotoTrans under licence from Ducati

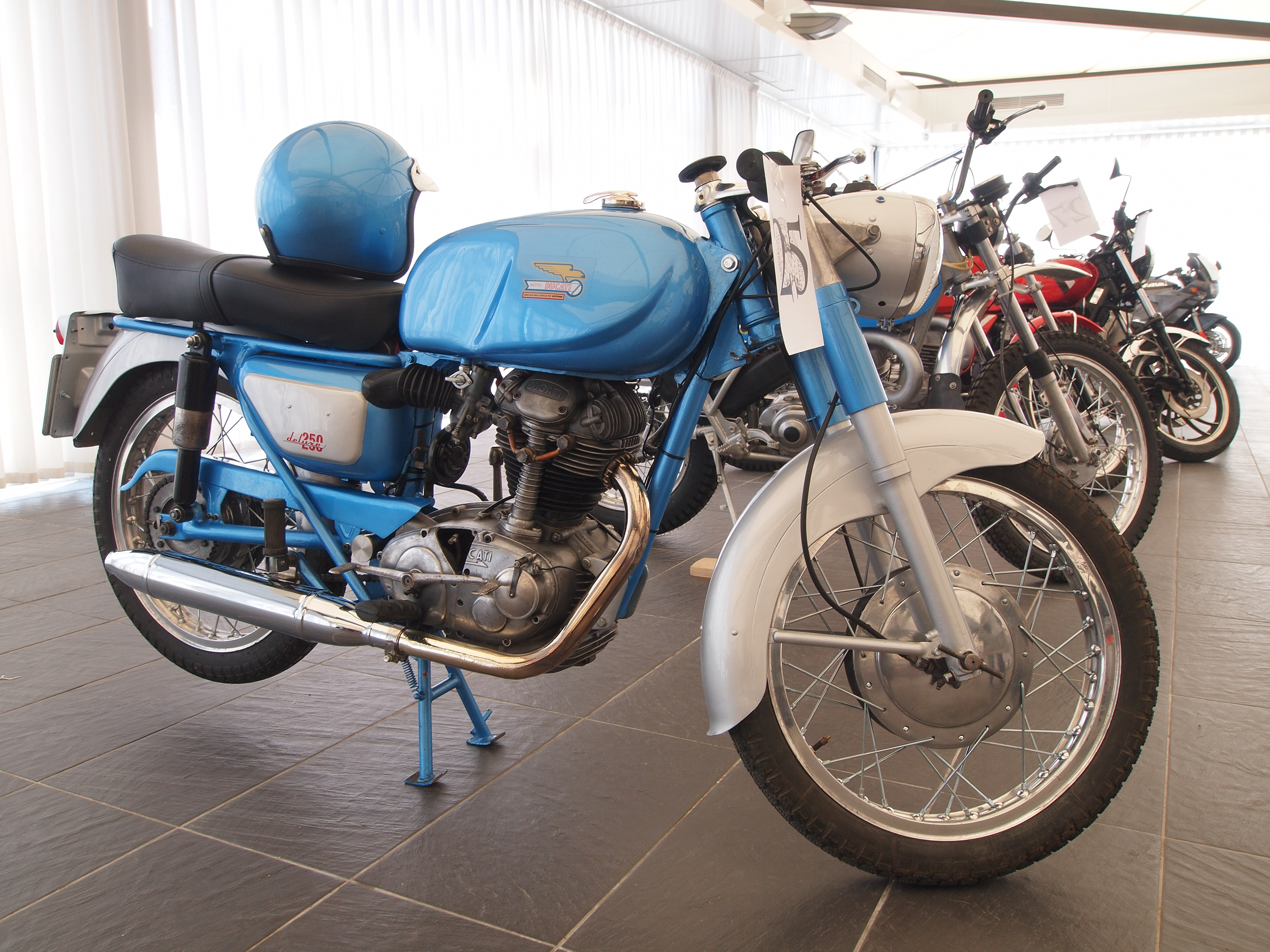
- Ducati Deluxe
- Manufacturer: Ducati/MotoTrans
- Production: 1963-1973
- Successor: Ducati Road 250
- Class: Standard
- Engine: Air-cooled bevel drive SOHC single cylinder four stroke
- Bore / stroke: 69 mm × 66 mm (2.7 in × 2.6 in)
- Compression ratio: 8:1
- Top speed: 130 km/h (81 mph)
- Power: 20 bhp (15 kW) @ 7,000 rpm
- Transmission: Multiplate wet clutch, 4 speed
- Frame type: Single cradle
- Suspension: Front: telescopic forks Rear: swinging arm
- Brakes: Drum front & rear
- Tyres: 275x18 front & rear
- Wheelbase: 1,320 mm (52 in)
- Weight: 110 kg (240 lb) (dry)
- Fuel capacity: 18 L (4.0 imp gal; 4.8 US gal)

The Ducati Deluxe is a 247 cc (15.1 cu in) single cylinder bevel drive SOHC motorcycle produced by the Spanish manufacturer MotoTrans, who were licensed by Ducati to produce motorcycles under the Ducati brand name. The model was based on the 'narrow case' Ducati Diana 250 and produced from 1963 to 1973. The Deluxe was, in terms of production numbers, MotoTrans' most successful model.

== History ==
In post-Civil War Spain, the Franco regime banned the import of motorcycles and also forbade foreign nationals from settling in Spain, or stating a business there. Moto Guzzi and MV Agusta motorcycles had been manufactured in Barcelona, Spain under licence by Moto Guzzi Hispania and MV Alpha since the late 1940s. MotoTrans was set up to manufacture Ducati motorcycles under licence in Barcelona in 1957.

Bultaco and Montesa had both introduced their second generation two strokes, which had better performance than the Spanish Ducatis. This prompted MotoTrans to produce a 250 based on the Italian Diana. Suitable cylinder liners for the 250's 74 mm (2.9 in) bore could not be obtained in Spain, so the liners from the 200 cc Elite were used, bored to 69 mm (2.7 in). The stroke was increased to 66 mm (2.6 in) to give a 247 cc (15.1 cu in) displacement.

There were minor changes during the production life such as handlebars and mudguards. The machines were finished in blue and metallic silver, except for a few machines that were exported to the UK and finished in Black and silver. A five speed gearbox was fitted from late 1970.

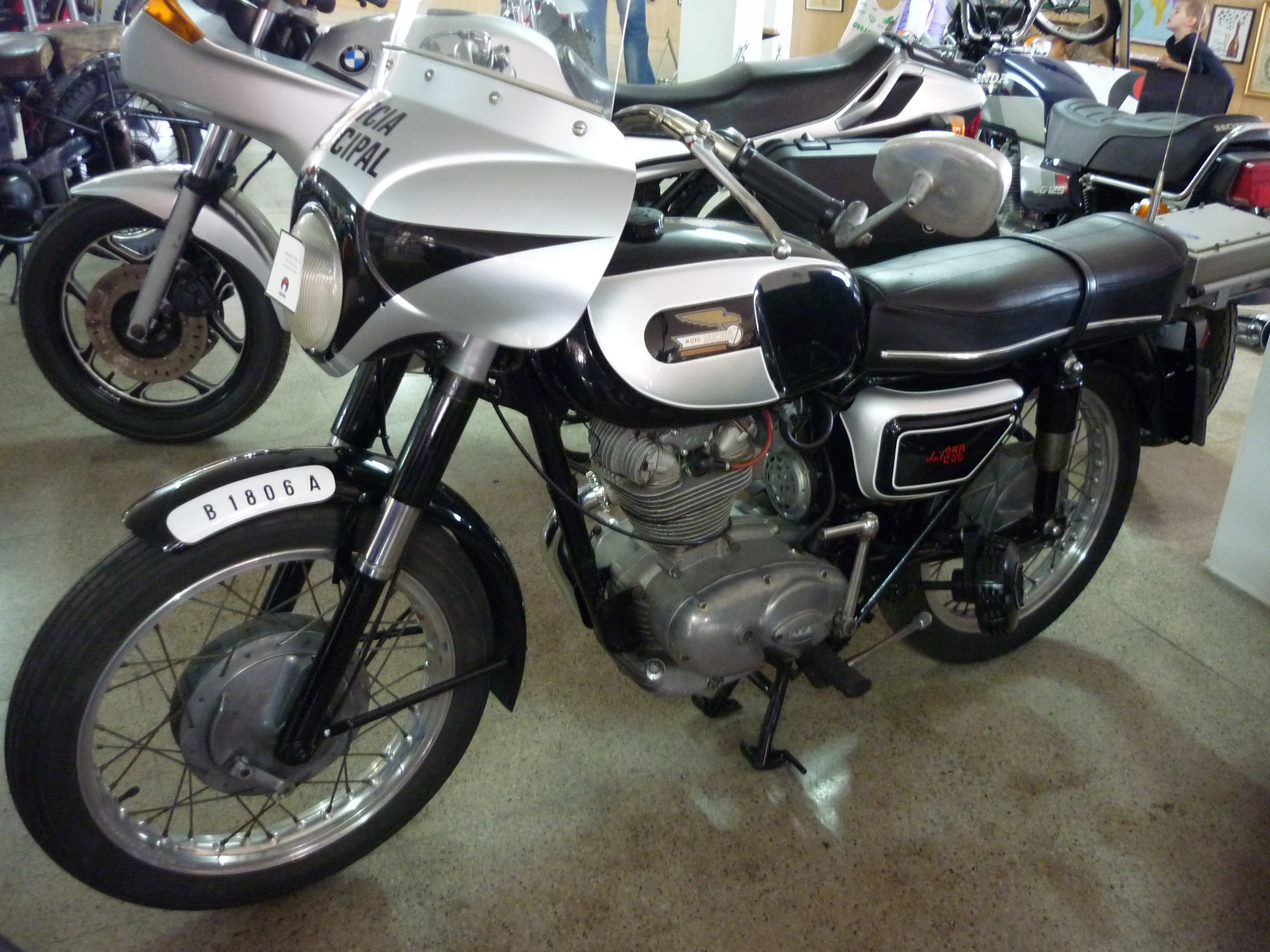
1967 Deluxe used by the Police in Mollet del Vallès

A version of the Deluxe was used by the Guàrdia Urbana de Barcelona and other police forces.

In 1973, the final year of production, the model was updated using the 25 bhp (19 kW) engine from the 24 Horas/Road, the wider wheels of the Road and the seat, instruments and headlight of the 24 Horas. The 73 model was finished in cherry red and old gold.

== Technical details ==
=== Engine and transmission ===
The single cylinder bevel drive OHC engine was of unit construction and had an alloy head and alloy barrel with cast iron liners. Bore and stroke were 69 mm × 66 mm (2.7 in × 2.6 in) giving a displacement of 247 cc (15.1 cu in). An 8:1 piston was fitted. Claimed power output was 20 bhp (15 kW) @ 7,000 rpm, giving the machine a top speed of 130 km/h (81 mph). Power was increased to 25 bhp (19 kW) for 1973.

Fuel was delivered by either a 24 mm Dell'Orto UB or a Spanish made Amal Monobloc 376/25 carburettor. The engine used wet sump lubrication and ignition was by battery and coil.

Primary drive was by gears to a multi-plate wet clutch and 4 speed gearbox. Chain drive took power to the rear wheel. A 5 speed gearbox was fitted from 1970.

=== Cycle parts ===
The single cradle frame used the engine as a stressed member. Rear suspension was by swinging arm with twin adjustable shock absorbers. At the front telescopic forks were fitted. Brakes were drums, the front being 180 mm (7.1 in) diameter and the rear 160 mm (6.3 in).
