= MV Agusta 125 Pullman =

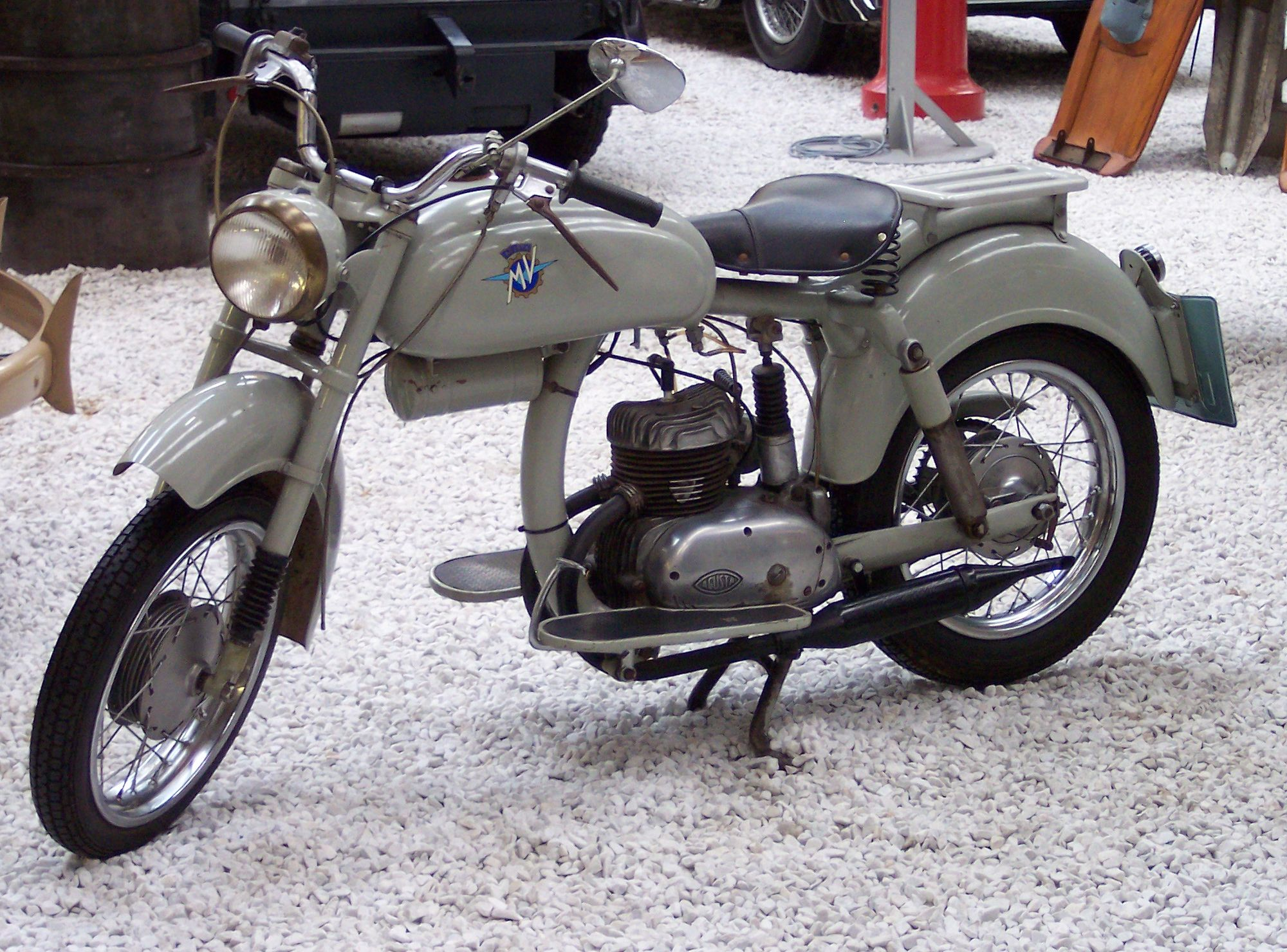
- 1953 MV Agusta 125 Pullman
- Manufacturer: MV Agusta
- Production: 1953-1958
- Class: Standard
- Engine: 123.5 cc Two-stroke
- Bore / stroke: 53 × 56 mm
- Compression ratio: 6:1
- Top speed: 75 km/h
- Power: Pullman: 5 bhp @ 4,500 rpm Super Pullman: 6 bhp @ 5,200 rpm
- Ignition type: Flywheel Magneto
- Transmission: Wet multi-plate clutch, 3 gears (4 gears on Super Pullman), chain drive
- Frame type: Pullman: Single cradle Super Pullman: Pressed steel beam
- Suspension: Front: Telescopic forks (Pullman), Earles forks (Super Pullman; Rear: Swinging arm
- Brakes: Drum brakes, 125 mm diameter
- Tires: Pullman: 3.50 x 15; Super Pullman: 2.75 x 18
- Wheelbase: 1,870 mm

The MV Agusta 125 Pullman was a motorcycle produced by the Italian manufacturer MV Agusta from 1953 to 1956. The model achieved a good sales success, and had the highest production of any machine from MV Agusta. Many brought the bike as the only means of family transport or as a work vehicle. Despite the questionable aesthetics, the Pullman offered a comfortable ride, derived by the driving position, soft suspension and large section tires. This was particularly appreciated by users, so much so that they were imitated by some competitors. 27,000 machines of this model series were produced. The model was also produced under licence in Spain by Avello, where it was marketed as the MV Avello 125 Pullman Turismo.

== Background ==
At the beginning of the fifties, the motorcycle manufacturers tried to counter the rampant success of scooters produced by Piaggio and Innocenti by creating utility motorcycle that offered good versatility and practicality of use, overcoming the serious stability problems of the scooter, due to the small diameter of its wheels.

Following the lead of Moto Guzzi who, in 1950, had put the Galletto into production, other motorcycle manufacturers ventured into the construction of hybrid models, such as the Sterzi Confort and Motom Delfino.

== Series 1 ==
Unveiled at the Brussels Motor Show in January 1953, the "Pullman" stood out for its rather original appearance. The cycle parts apparently stretched by the effect of the engine in a very rearward position with the rear suspension mounted on it.

The engine was a unit construction, The engine was an air-cooled single-cylinder two-stroke with a bore and stroke of 53 × 56 mm giving a displacement 123.5 cc. These dimensions were the same as the previous Motore Lungo model. Compression ratio was 6:1, and the engine was fed by a Dell'Orto MA17 carburetor. Ignition was by a flywheel magneto. A Wet multi-plate clutch was driven by gears from the crankshaft, and a three-speed gearbox was fitted, which was controlled by a twist grip. Drive to the rear wheel was by chain.

The MV Agusta had an open cradle frame, made of steel tube, similar in shape to that of MV's "125 Ovunque" scooter, which itself was modelled on the successful "Lambretta 125 C" of 1950. Attached to the gearbox was the swinging arm, with an undamped shock absorber each side. Additionally a hydraulic central shock absorber was fitted. The machine was fitted with telescopic forks and 130 mm drum brakes.

Rider comfort was enhanced by foot plates rather than the usual footrests, a single saddle and wide, for its class, 3,50 x 15 tyres. A rack was fitted above the rear mudguard. The position of the engine created an unusual gap between the front wheel and the downtube of the frame that could be fitted with an optional sheet metal fairing, which could be used as a storage compartment.

Priced between 155,000 and 163,000 Lira, dependent on options, sales of the model were good and helped MV Augusta to achieve and annual production of over 20,000 units.

== Series 2 ==
The second series of the Pullman introduced in 1954. Apart from cosmetic changes, the twist grip gearchange was replaced by a conventional foot change. The rear shock absorbers were changed to hydraulically damped units, and the now redundant third shock absorber omitted.

Production of this model stopped in 1956.

== Super Pullman ==
In 1955 the Pullman was joined by the "Super Pullman" model. This model was intended to look more like a "normal" motorcycle. A sheet metal beam frame was used. The frame was pressed in two halves that were electrowelded together. Earles forks and more conventionally sized 18" wheels were fitted. Engine power was increased to 6 bhp @ 5,200 rpm.

The last machines produced in 1957 were used to test a prototype fuel injection 125 cm^{3} two-stroke engine which, due to the crisis in the motorcycle sector following the marketing of the Fiat 500, did not go into production. Production of the Super Pullman ceased in 1958, after approximately 3,000 machines had been made.
