= Ducati 24 Horas =

SOHC motorcycle made by MotoTrans under licence from Ducati

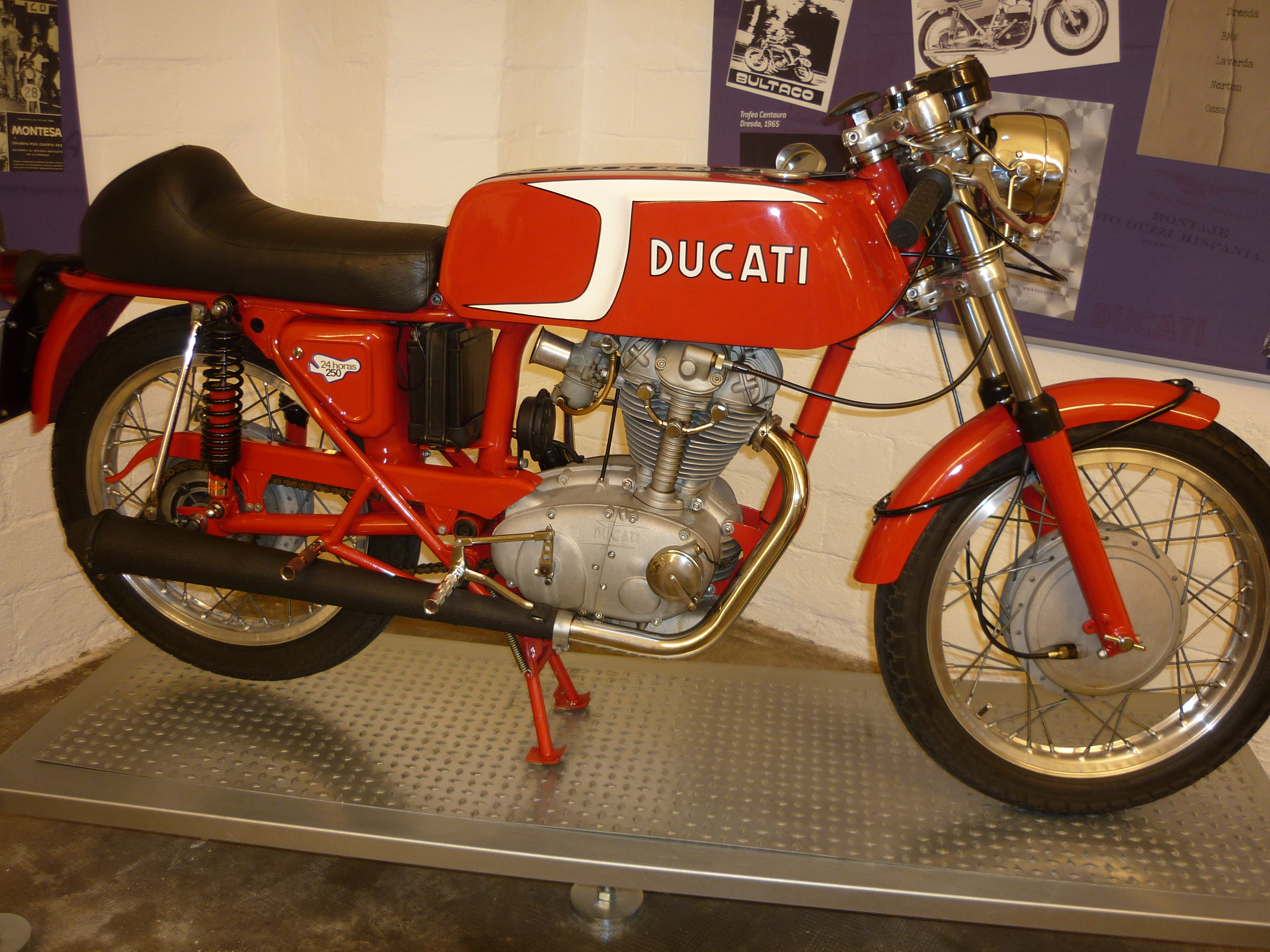
- 1973 Ducati 24 Horas
- Manufacturer: Ducati/MotoTrans
- Production: 1966-1974
- Class: sports
- Engine: Air-cooled bevel drive SOHC single cylinder four stroke
- Bore / stroke: 69 mm × 66 mm (2.7 in × 2.6 in)
- Compression ratio: 10:1
- Top speed: 100 mph (160 km/h)
- Power: 25 bhp (19 kW) @ 9,000 rpm
- Transmission: Multiplate wet clutch, 5 speed
- Frame type: Single cradle
- Suspension: Front: telescopic forks Rear: swinging arm
- Brakes: Drum front & rear
- Tyres: Front: 275x18 Rear: 275x18
- Wheelbase: 1,285 mm (50.6 in)
- Weight: 118 kg (260 lb) (dry)
- Fuel capacity: 14 L (3.1 imp gal; 3.7 US gal)
- Related: Ducati Mach 1 Ducati Diana Mark 3

The Ducati 250 24 Horas (24 hours) is a 247 cc (15.1 cu in) single cylinder bevel drive SOHC motorcycle produced by the Spanish manufacturer MotoTrans, who were licensed by Ducati to produce motorcycles under the Ducati brand name. The model was based on the 'narrow case' Ducati 250 and produced in three series from 1966 to 1974. It was named after Ducati's successes in the 24 hours of Montjuïc endurance races. Around 2,000 machines were produced in total.

== Background ==
MotoTrans started manufacturing Ducati motorcycles under licence in Barcelona in 1958. They produced their first 250, the Deluxe, in 1963 which was based on the Diana. Amongst other changes, the bore and stroke were changed from the Italian bike's 74 mm × 57.8 mm (2.91 in × 2.28 in) to 69 mm × 66 mm (2.7 in × 2.6 in).

Ducati had been competing in Barcelona's 24 hours of Montjuïc since 1957, winning in 1957, 1958 and 1960. Ducati withdrew from competing after the 1960 race and Mototrans took over the Ducati participation. They won in 1962 and then in 1964 they won again, this time with a tuned and over bored 285 cc version of the 250.

== Model history ==
First presented at the December 1965 Barcelona and the January 1966 Madrid Exhibitions, the 24 Horas went in production in 1966. The engine was tuned with a high lift camshaft and a 10:1 piston and was fitted with a Spanish-made Amal 376 Monobloc carburettor. The model was styled as a cafe racer was fitted with a fibreglass racing tank, clip-on handlebars, rearset footrest and a megaphone exhaust. A five speed gearbox was fitted. The bike was finished in red with a Black headlight. About 500 machines were manufactured in the first series.

In 1968 a second series was introduced with a racing hump on the saddle and larger brakes, the front being twin leading-shoe. A new headlight was fitted with separate instruments.

A third series was manufacturer in 1973/4 that used an Amal Concentric carb.

=== UK ===
Few Italian-made Ducatis were imported to the UK and US during 1970–71 as the importers (Berliner in the US and Vic Camp in the UK) were in dispute with the factory over prices. During this period Spanish-built MotoTrans models were imported.

Vic Camp imported 150 24 Horas in 1971 and another 80 in 1972. One of these suffered camshaft failure after 1,600 km (990 mi) which the dealer refused to repair. The case was reported in Motorcycle News and the model became known as the 24 Horrors. The quality of the case hardening was poor on the Spanish-made camshafts.

== Technical details ==
=== Engine and transmission ===
The single cylinder bevel drive OHC engine was of a vertically spilt unit construction and had alloy head and alloy barrel with austenitic liners. Hairspring valve springs were used to close the valves. Bore and stroke were 69 mm × 66 mm (2.7 in × 2.6 in) giving a displacement of 247 cc (15.1 cu in). Compression ratio was 8:1 and claimed power output was 25 bhp (19 kW) @ 9,000 rpm.

Fuel was delivered by a 27 mm Spanish made Amal 375 Monobloc carburettor on early models and an Amal Concentric on later models. Wet sump lubrication was used and ignition was by battery and coil.

Primary drive was by helical gears to a multi-plate wet clutch to a 5 speed gearbox. Chain drive took power to the rear wheel.

=== Cycle parts ===
The single cradle frame used the engine as a stressed member, and was made of thicker tubing than the Italian models and heavily braced. Rear suspension was by swinging arm with twin Betor shock absorbers. At the front 35 mm (1.4 in) Telesco telescopic forks were fitted. Brakes were drums, 180 mm (7.1 in) diameter front and rear on the first series. These were changed to 200 mm (7.9 in) when the second series was introduced, the front being a twin leading-shoe unit.
