= MV Agusta Raid =

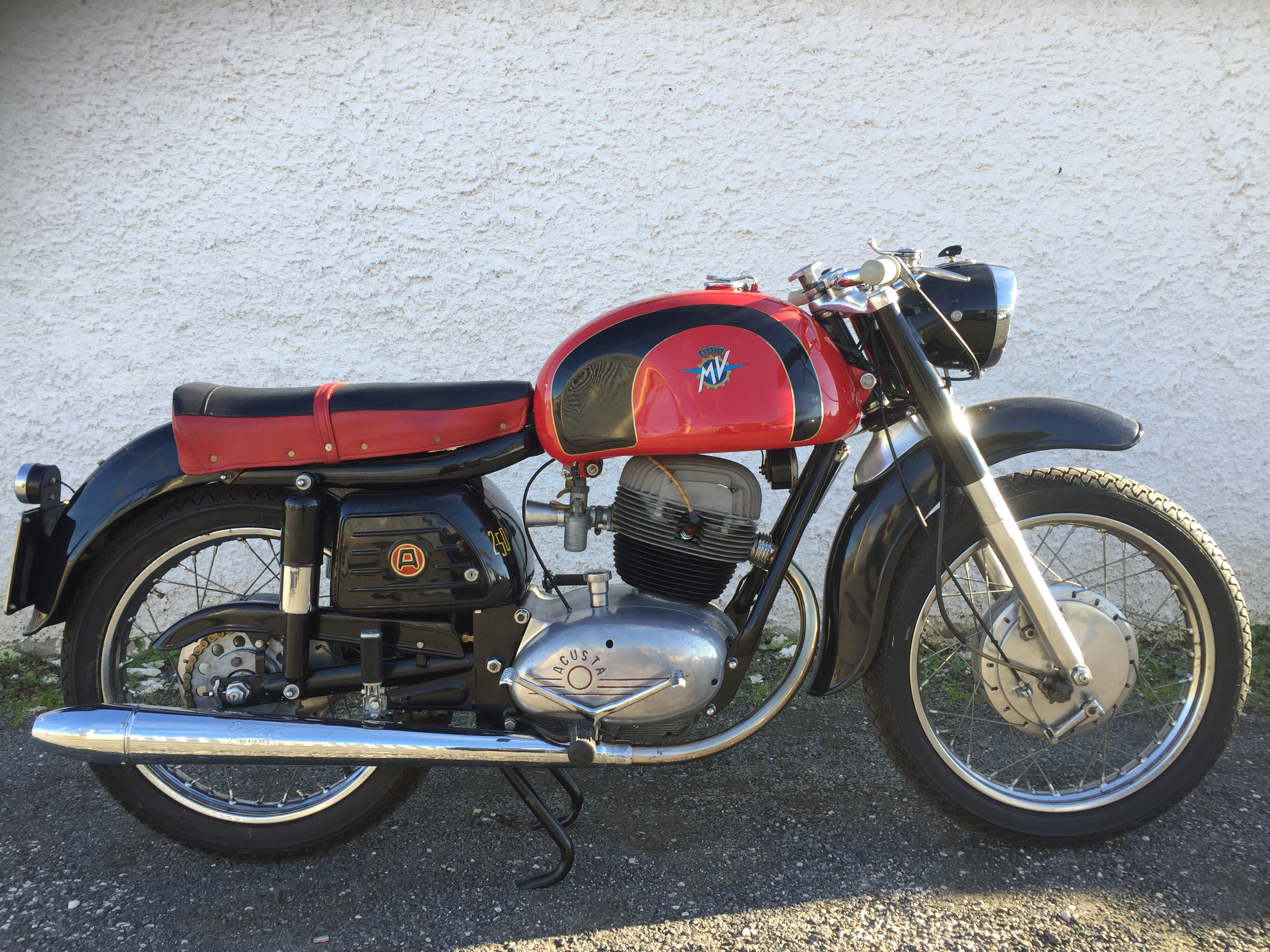
- MV Agusta 250 Raid
- Manufacturer: MV Agusta
- Production: 1957-1961
- Assembly: Cascina Costa, Italy
- Engine: air-cooled, single-cylinder OHV
- Bore / stroke: 247 cc: 69 x 66 mm 301 cc: 74 x 70 mm
- Compression ratio: 7.2:1
- Power: 247 cc: 14 bhp (10.4 kW) @ 5,600 rpm 301 cc: 16 bhp (12 kW) @ 5,000 rpm
- Transmission: Wet, multi-plate clutch, unit construction 4-speed gearbox, chain drive
- Suspension: Front: telescopic forks Rear: swinging arm with hydraulic dampers
- Brakes: 200 mm drum brakes front & rear
- Tires: Front 3.00 x 19; Rear: 3.25 x 19
- Wheelbase: 1,340 mm
- Dimensions: L: 2,040 mm W: 590 mm
- Weight: 145 kg (dry)

The MV Agusta Raid was a series of 250 and 300 cc motorcycles manufactured by the MV Agusta company in Cascina Costa, Italy from 1957 to 1961. At the time of introduction, the 250 cc class was considered a large capacity motorcycle.

== Overview ==
When the 250 cc Raid was introduced at the 1956 Milan EICMA Motorcycle Show, it received considerable interest as a machine that "could cross a continent". The name, which in Italian means a long, fast and adventurous trip, was chosen following a survey of MV dealers. Production started in 1957, but sales of the 250 were not as good as expected.

In an attempt to increase sales, a 300 cc version was introduced in 1959. MV attempted to sell a police version to the Guardia di Finanza with little success, and the Italian Armed Forces, who purchased the military version in limited numbers.

Priced initially at 286,000 lira for the 250 cc and 290,000 lire for the 300 cc, the success hoped for was not realised with only 544 250 cc machines and about 500 300 cc machines being produced.

== Models ==
=== 250 Raid ===
The initial 250 model was propelled by a 247 cc air-cooled, single-cylinder OHV engine. Bore and stroke was 69 x 66 mm and compression ratio was 7.2:1. Breathing through a 24 mm Dell'Orto carburettor, the engine produced 14 bhp (10.4 kW) at 5,600 rpm. A geared primary drive fed the power to a 4 speed gearbox.

The frame was MV's usual arrangement of a double cradle made of tubular and pressed steel. Telescopic front forks were fitted and a swinging arm with hydraulic shock absorbers at the rear. 200 mm drum brakes were fitted front and rear. The machine was finished in black with red detailing. Top speed was 115 km/h (72 mph).

=== 250 Raid Extra ===
The Raid Extra version was equipped with the same mechanical components as the Raid but had a higher specification finish. It was finished in red with white highlighting.

=== 300 Raid ===
In 1959, in an attempt to recover the poor sales of the 250, a 300 cc version was introduced. The bore was increased to 74 mm and the stroke to 70 mm, which gave a 301 cc displacement and an output of 16 bhp (12 kW) at 5,000 rpm. To give a similar fuel consumption to the 250, the carburettor was reduced to 22 mm.

A new petrol tank, mudguards and exhaust were fitted, otherwise the cycle parts were the same as the 250.

=== 300 Raid Militaire ===
A special version, the 300 Raid Militaire, was produced in limited quantities for Italian Armed Forces in 1961. The model was fitted with two individual saddles and finished in a drab green.

=== 300 Raid Polizia ===
Modified for police use, the 300 Raid Polizia was introduced, but this variant was not taken up by the police.

== Spanish production ==
The 300 Raid was made under licence in Spain by MV Avello in the city of Gijón in the autonomous community of Asturias. The model was marketed in Spain as the 300 Nalón, the name of a local river. The Spanish model was the largest MV produced in Spain and used a different frame and differed in appearance from the Italian model. Production was from 1961 - 1966 (the 1966 models being supplied from old stock).
