= Alpha (motorcycle) =

Motorcycle brand from Spain

- Traded as: MV Alpha (1948-1951)
- Founded: 1924; 101 years ago in Barcelona, Spain
- Founder: Nilo Maso Miró
- Defunct: 1957
- Headquarters: Barcelona, Spain
- Products: Motorcycles, motocarros

Alpha was a brand of Spanish motorcycles and motocarros manufactured in Barcelona by Nilo Maso Miró between 1924 and 1957.

== History ==
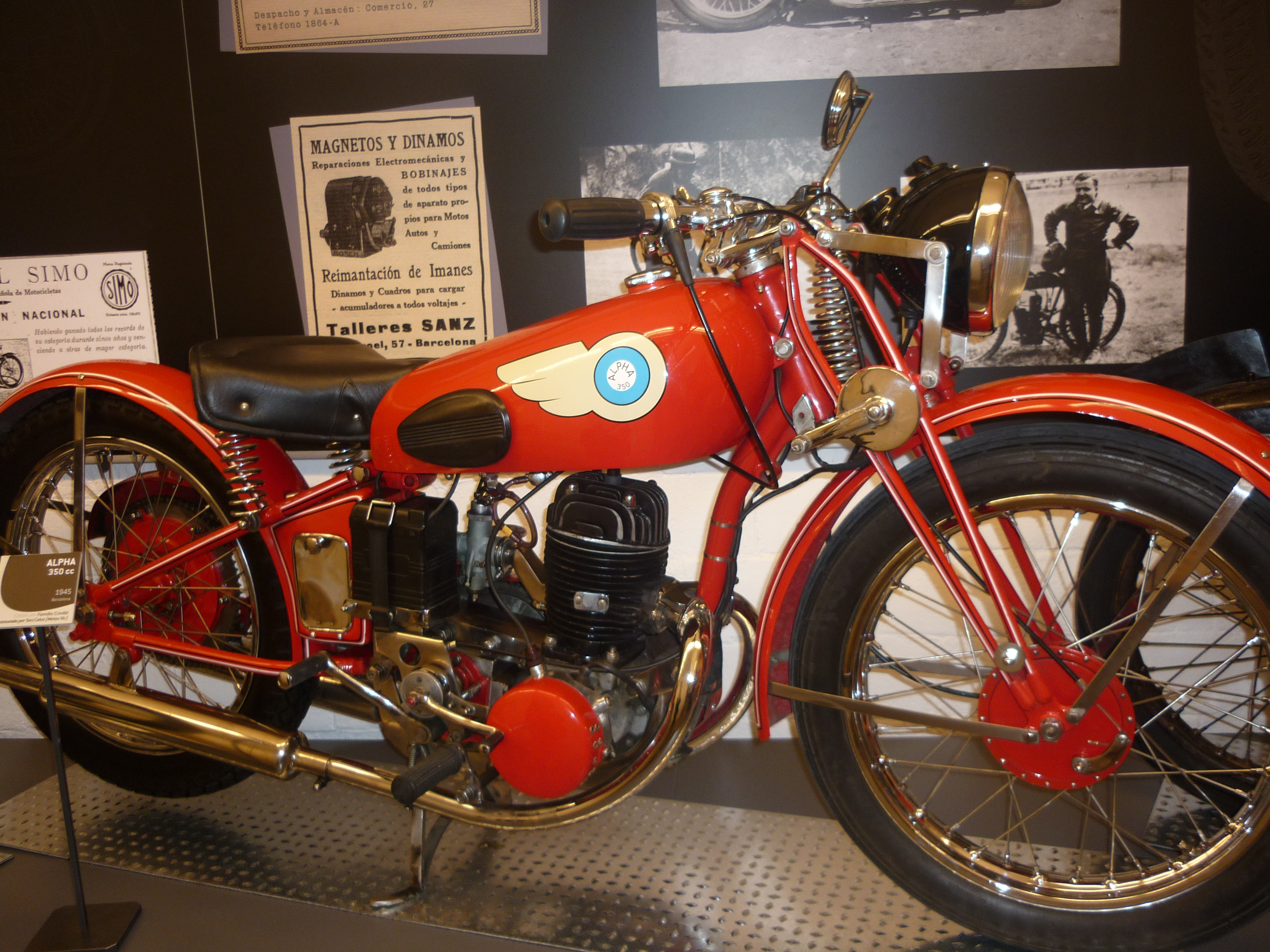
1945 350 cc Alpha - Museu de la Moto de Barcelona (Catalonia).

Nilo Masó Miró, a former speed driver, started his motorcycle manufacturing company in 1924 in Barcelona, producing machines powered by 175 and 250 cc two-stroke engines from Villiers and DKW. Alpha became one of the leading Spanish motorcycle manufacturers of the period before the Spanish Civil War. The marque was known for the pleasing aesthetics of its models.

After the war, when the import of foreign parts was severely restricted, and like many other manufacturers, the factory turned to the reconstruction of ex-army machines and the construction of auxiliary motors for bicycles.

== MV Alpha ==
Count Agusta had plans to expand the MV Agusta brand internationally. In post-Civil War Spain, the Franco regime banned the import of motorcycles and also forbade foreign nationals from settling in Spain, or stating a business there. Brothers Mario and Natale Corando intended to set up manufacture of MV machines under licence by a local factory, which had licenses and manufacturing permits and therefore have access to raw materials. A deal was struck with Nilo Masó of Alpha. To provide finance, Enrique Favier and Antonio Sommariva joined the venture and MV Alpha was formed in 1948.

In the first models went on sale. They were powered by a 125 cc two-stroke engine and offered as standard, lujo (luxury) and sports models. Power output was 3.2 bhp, and 4.5 bhp for the sports models, giving top speeds of 60 and 70 km/h. A smaller 98 cc model was subsequently produced. Sales were good, but because of the limited facilities of Alpha, production could not be increased. The licence to produce MV motorcycles was transferred to the larger and better equipped Avello factory in the Natahoyo neighbourhood of Gijón in Asturias in 1951, creating the MV Avello brand.

== Demise ==
The loss of the MV license caused the beginning of the decline of Alpha workshops. In 1953 Alpha collaborated in the construction of the Evycsa motorcycle with four-stroke FITA-AMC engines. Also produced were distribution tricycles (equipped with OSSA and Hispano Villiers engines ) and a 175cc light motorcycle, inspired by the BSA Bantam. The factory finally closed in 1957.

== Resurrection ==
The name was resurrected in 2014, with 100% Spanish capital, to produce motorcycles and electric bicycles. They planned to produce a cafe racer derived from the Ducati 800SS styled on the Bonneville Salt Flats racers. An electric bike similar to the Bultaco Brinco was also planned. The company was located in the Province of Pontevedra.

In 2017, the company introduced lightweight carbon fibre drake discs for bicycles. They were claimed to be the lightest discs available at between 32 and 70 grams dependent of size.

== Bibliography ==
- Herreros, Francisco; Aznar, José Luis (1998). "Relación de las principales marcas". In Herreros, Francisco (ed.). Historia del motociclismo en España (in Spanish). RACC Club. ISBN 9788492088652.
