= Avello (motorcycle) =

Avello SA
- Company type: Manufacturer
- Industry: Motorcycle
- Founded: June 1, 1940; 85 years ago in Gijón, Asturias, Spain
- Founder: Alfredo Avello
- Defunct: 1988
- Fate: Acquired by Suzuki
- Successor: Suzuki Motor España
- Headquarters: Gijón, Spain
- Brands: MV Avello; Puch Avello; Puch-Suzuki

Avello was a Spanish manufacturer of machine tools, motorcycles and scooters, famous for its MV Agusta and Puch brand machines. It was founded by Alfredo Avello in 1940 and closed in March 2013. The factory was in the city of Gijón in Asturias, northern Spain.

== MV Avello ==
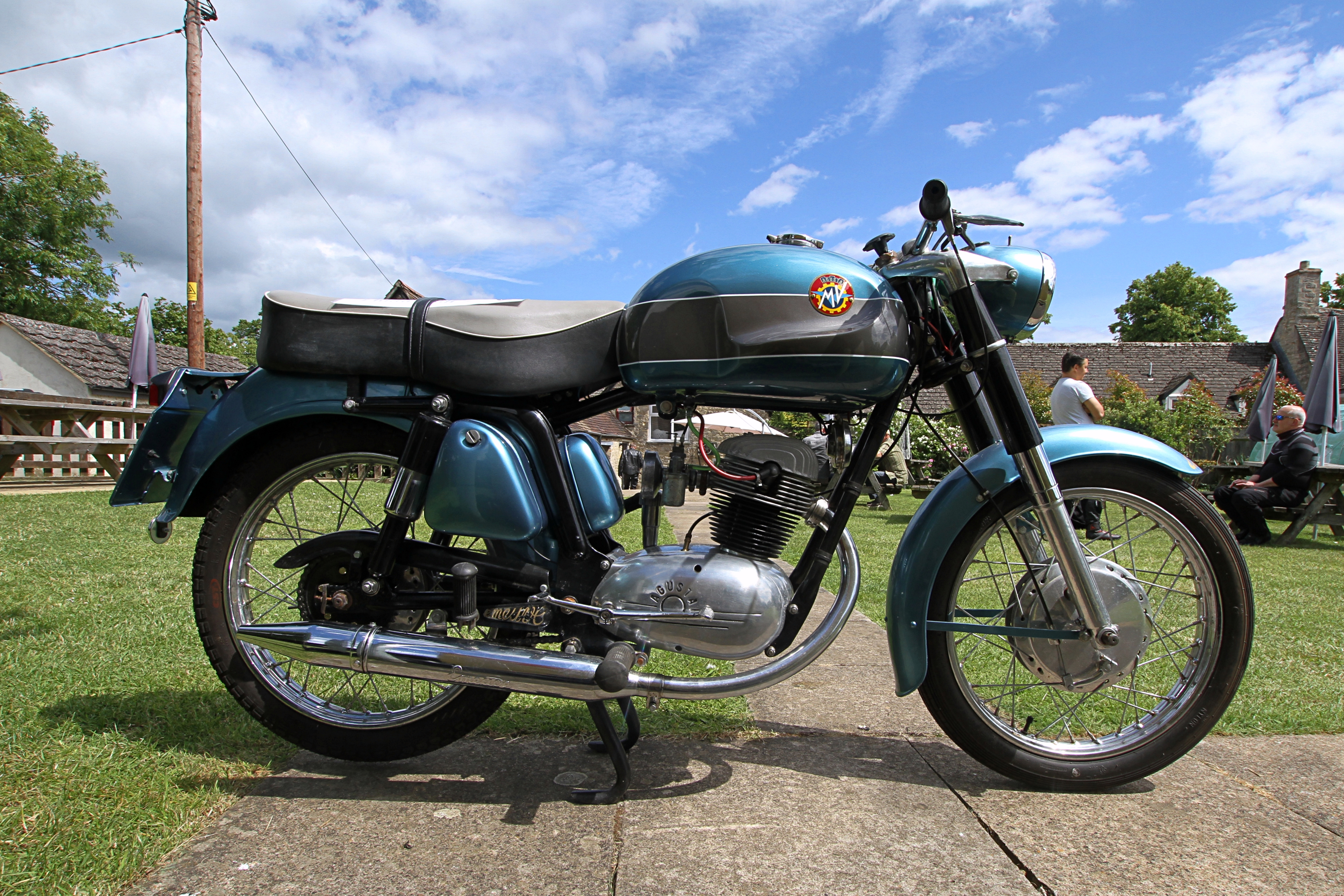
MV Agusta CC ("Ciento Cindcuenta"), a 150cc four-stroke single introduced in 1960

Basque industrial engineer, Alfredo Avello purchased an existing company in the Natahoyo neighbourhood of Gijón that produced machinery and machine tools on June 1, 1940, changing the name to Avello y Compañía SL.

MV Augusta had been producing machine for local sale in Barcelona since 1949, branded MV Alpha. At a race held in Gijón, Avello approached MV's Spanish promoters and convinced them to transfer manufacture of the machines to his factory. In 1951, the first production machines came out of the factory, a 125 cc two-stroke. The Italian parent company became involved and a range of machines based on 125 & 150 cc engines were designed. The machines were sold under the MV Avello brand.

To support the brand in Spain, Count Agusta arranged for factory riders Remo Venturi (125 cc) and Carlo Bandirola (500 cc) to compete in the 1955 Spanish National Championships, including the "local" race at Gijón. On the works machines, the pair were virtually unbeatable. The following year the Avello machines started to be branded MV Agusta not MV Avello.

The factory began to diversify in 1961, making components for Authi, Barreiros, Renault and Vespa, and machinery for export.

In 1966 the factory was expanded to cover 22,000 square metres, 12,000 of which were 2 or 3 stories. A workforce of 350 were employed.

=== MV models timeline ===
Engine size	1951	1952	1953	1954	1955	1956	1957	1958	1959	1960	1961	1962	1963	1964	1965	1966	1967	1968	1969	1970	1971	1972
49 cc																	49 Piles					
125 cc	125 Turismo																					
125 cc			125 Turismo 4 speed																			
125 cc								125 Pullman Turismo (Note: Based on the MV Agusta 125 Pullman)														
125 cc									125 TR (Note: This was the first four-stroke model produced by the factory.)													
125 cc										125 TRL												
125 cc										125 SR												
150 cc				150 Turismo																		
150 cc				150 Sport																		
150 cc								150 S-18														
150 cc								150 T-18						150 T-18 (second series)								
150 cc										150 DC												
150 cc											150 Stella (Note: Based on the MV Agusta Gran Turismo 150)											
150 cc																	150 Stella GT					
150 cc														150 Narcea								
150 cc																	150 Narcea V					
175 cc												175 CS (Note: Based on the MV Agusta 175 CS)										
235 cc											235 Deva (Note: Based on the MV Agusta 235 Tevere)											
300 cc												300 Nalon (Note: Based on the MV Agusta 300 Raid)										

Key
Two-stroke
Four-stroke

== Puch Avello ==
Production quantities
- 1970: 1,525
- 1971: 7,890
- 1972: 8,571
- 1973: 13,977
- 1974: 17,573
- 1975: 21,238
- 1976: 29,339
- 1977: 36,645
- 1978: 38,429
- 1979: 41,643

Towards the end of the 1960s, MV were moving away from small capacity machines to concentrate on larger, multi-cylinder engine motorcycles. The lighter, simpler two-stroke were an important part of the Spanish market. Avello contacted Steyr-Daimler-Puch, who made mopeds and light motorcycles under their Puch brand. An agreement was reached, and in March 1970, the share capital of Avello was increased and Steyr-Daimler-Puch obtained 50% ownership of the company.

The first Puch model appeared soon after, the Trivel Borrasca. This was a moped using the existing piles frame and a Puch. Trivel Borrasca Super " and Trivel Plus Terral variants appeared soon afterwards. Various mopeds were produced between 1970 and 1972, alongside the MV models. Production of the MV models came to an end in 1972.

From 1973 various Puch models were produced using 50, 75 and 125 cc engines. Production increased steadily from 1,525 in 1970 to over 38,000 units in 1978. In that year Puch brought the rest of the company shares, giving them full ownership.

Although sales were good, in the 1982–83 financial year, the company made a loss of more than 200 million pesetas. The parent company, Steyr-Daimler-Puch, sold off the motorcycle manufacturing Puch division to Piaggio, the parent company of Vespa.

== Suzuki ==
In 1982 Puch had negotiated a technology transfer agreement with the Japanese Suzuki company, and because of Puch's financial crisis, Suzuki bought 36% stake in the company in 1984, contributing 500 million pesetas. The move was opposed by the three Spanish motorcycle factories Derbi, Vespa and Lambretta, who offered Avello a collaboration plan to produce components for their machines instead of assembling Suzuki products.

The first model of the Puch-Suzuki venture was the 75 cc Lido Vario scooter, leaving the factory in 1985. It was marketed under various names in Europe; Puch Lido Vario, Suzuki Lido Vario and Puch-Suzuki Lido Vario 75. This model was an evolution of the 1982 Suzuki 50.

In 1988 Suzuki bought all outstanding shares and became sole owner of the Spanish manufacturer, changing its name to Suzuki Motor España. A few years later Suzuki moved the manufacturing facility to the Porceyo neighbourhood of Gijón. In 2012, Suzuki announced that it was to close the plant.
