= Motorcycle seat =

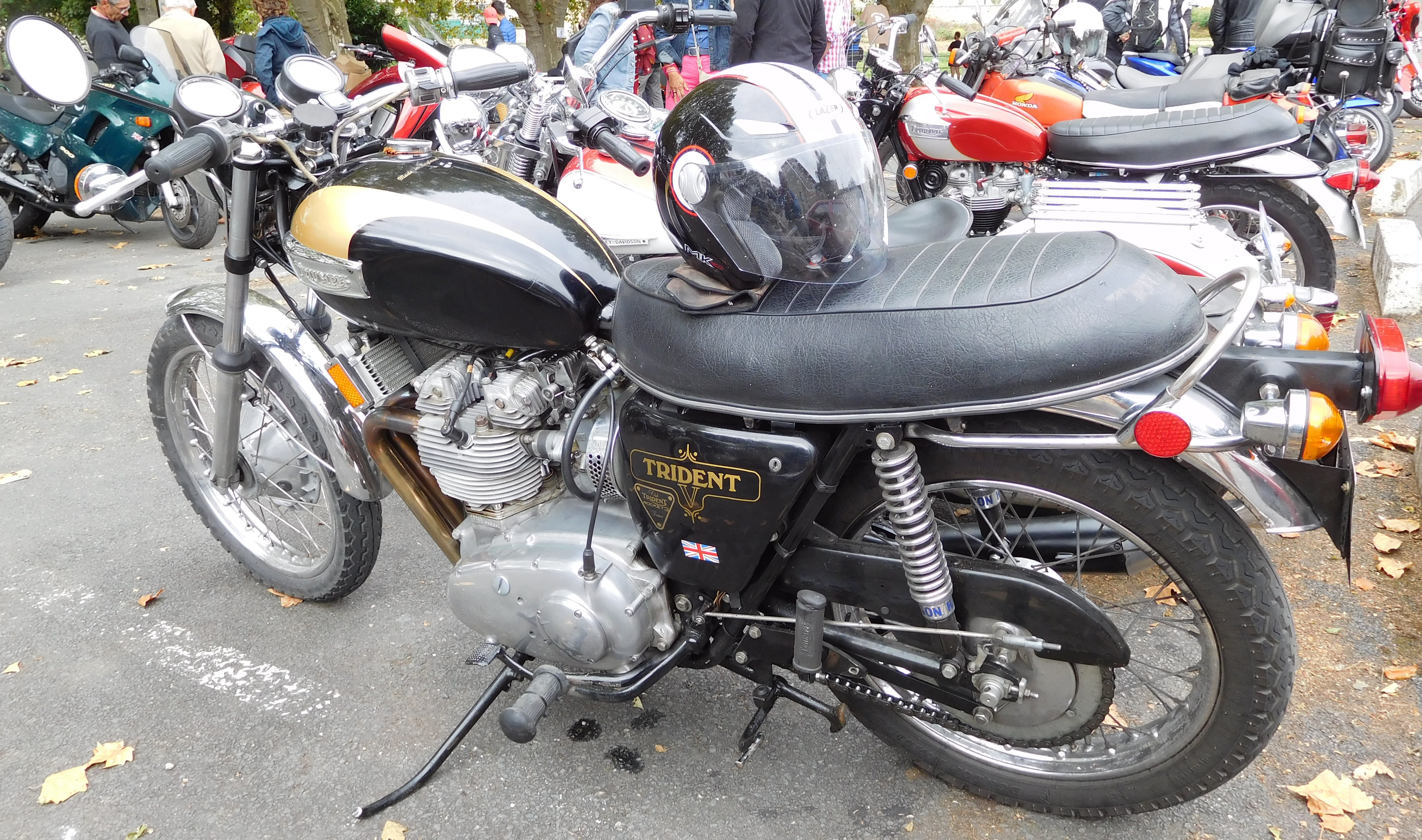
A dual seat, typical of most modern motorcycles

A motorcycle seat (sometimes saddle) is where rider sits, and may also accommodate a passenger.

The most common type of motorcycle seat is a dual saddle or bench seat, which runs along the top of the chassis and is long enough for a pillion passenger to straddle the motorcycle behind the rider. Two detached seats, rather than one elongated one, were more common until the mid 20th century. A single, or solo, seat is only large enough for the rider. They are typical of racing, off-road, and many historic motorcycles. In motorcycle trials, the bikes have no seating at all, as the rider remains standing on the footpegs for the entire competition.

The ideal motorcycle seat will vary according to the preferences and body type of the rider. Motorcycle seats are typically narrow and this may pose challenges for wider individuals.

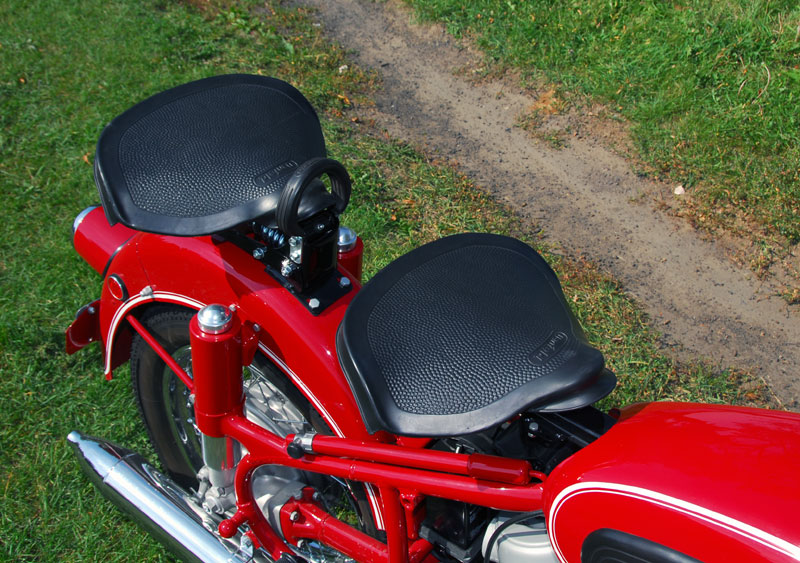
Separated rider and passenger seats on a 1969 BMW motorcycle

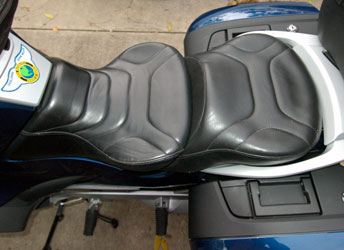
Modern seats on a 2007 BMW R1200RT

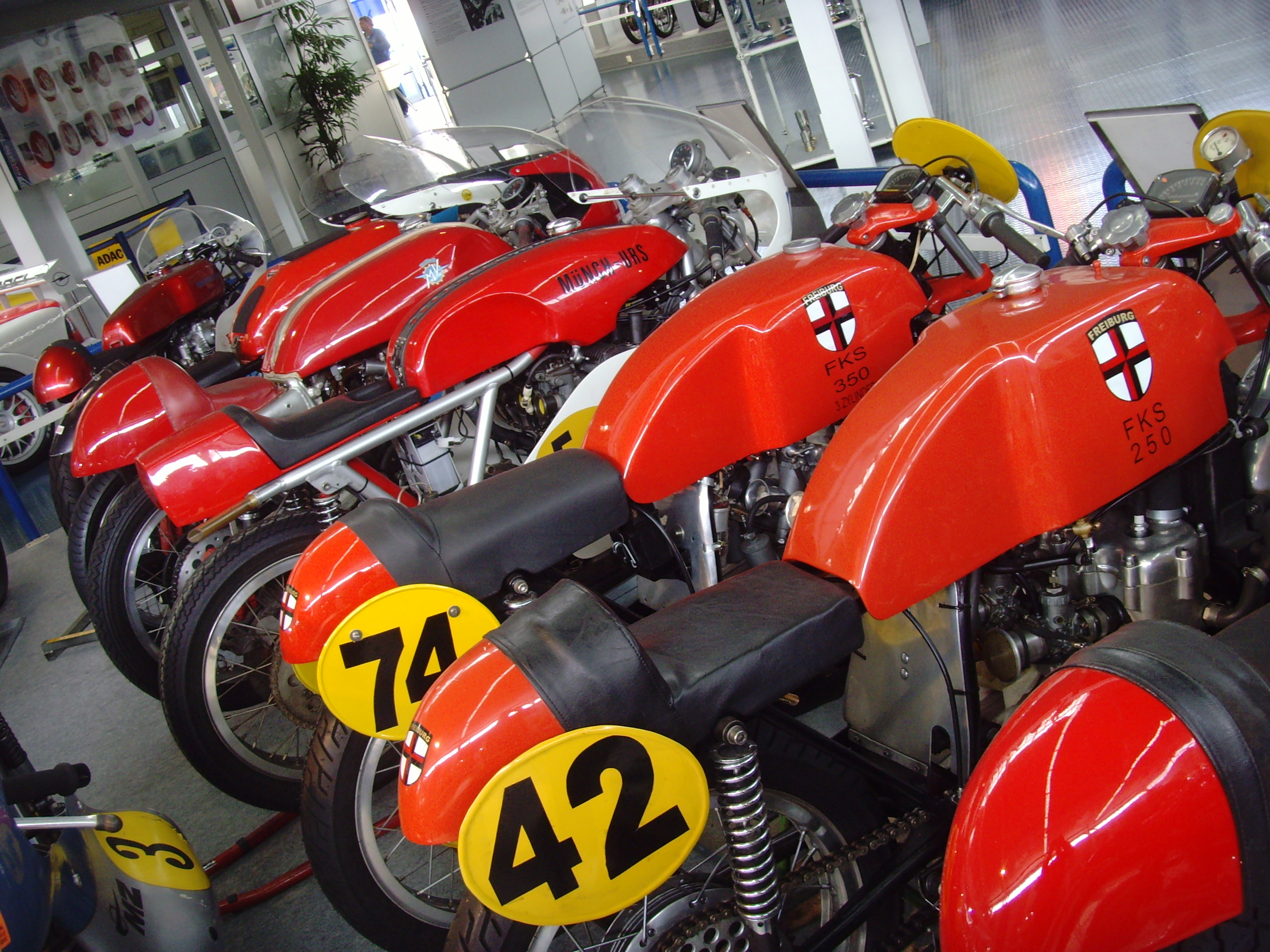
Solo racing seats

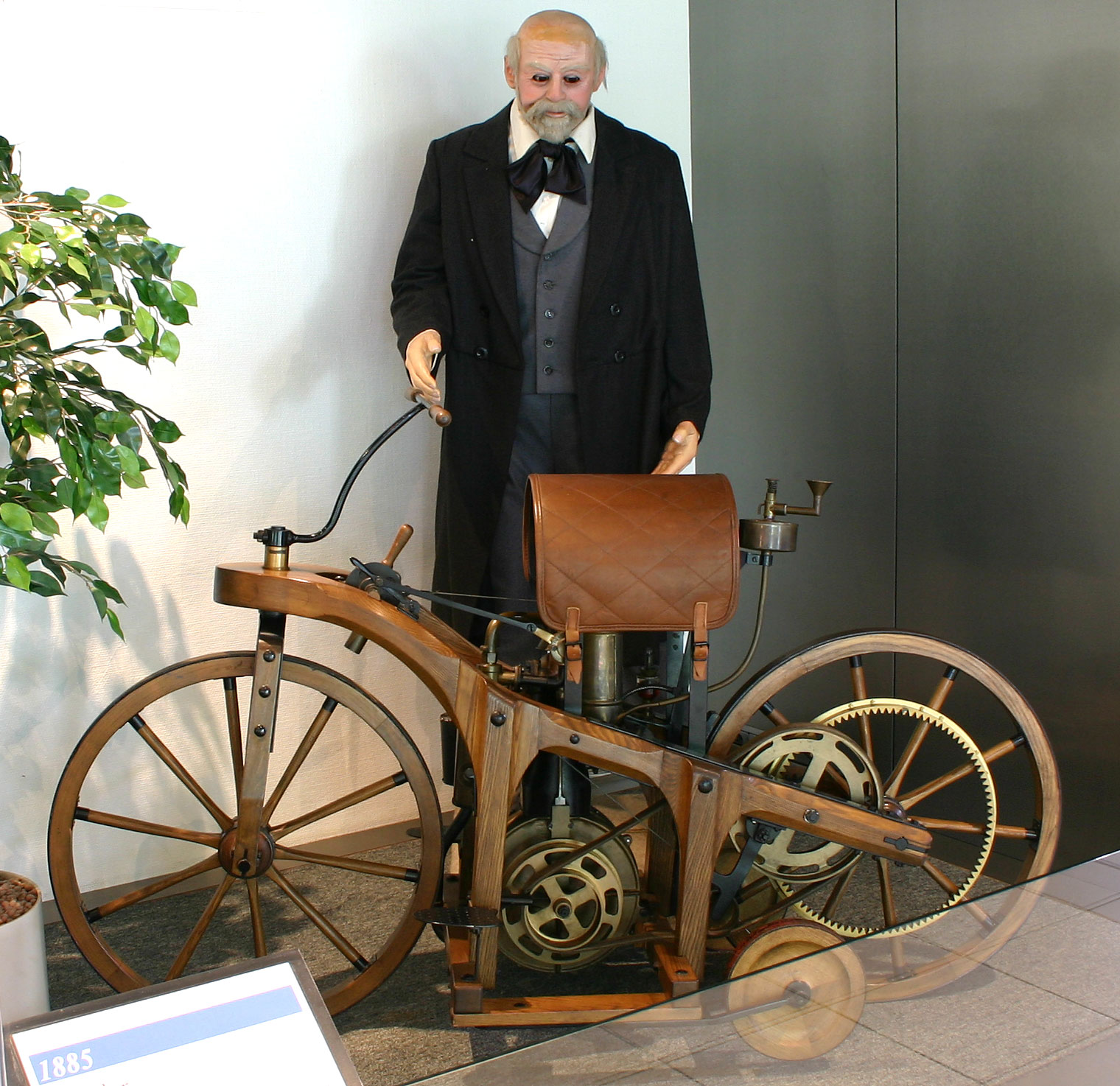
The 1885 Daimler Reitwagen

== See also ==
- Bicycle saddle
- Horse saddle
