= 700 (disambiguation) =

700 is a year. 700 may also refer to:

- 700 BC
- 700 (number)
- Lenovo IdeaPad 700, a discontinued brand of notebook computers
- Remington Model 700, a model of rifle
- 700 AM
- Unit 700, covert logistics and smuggling division within the Quds Force.

== Transportation ==
- BMW 700, a supermini car
- Tatra 700, a full-size luxury car
- Volvo 700 Series, a series of automobiles made by Volvo
- Jawa 700, an automobile
- Coastliner 700, a bus route in the United Kingdom
- Ram 700, a subcompact pickup truck sold in Mexico as a rebadged Fiat Strada
- Tank 700, a full-size luxury SUV

== See also ==
- List of highways numbered 700
- 700 series (disambiguation)
- 700 MHz (disambiguation)
