= Yamaha Ténéré 700 =

Adventure bike

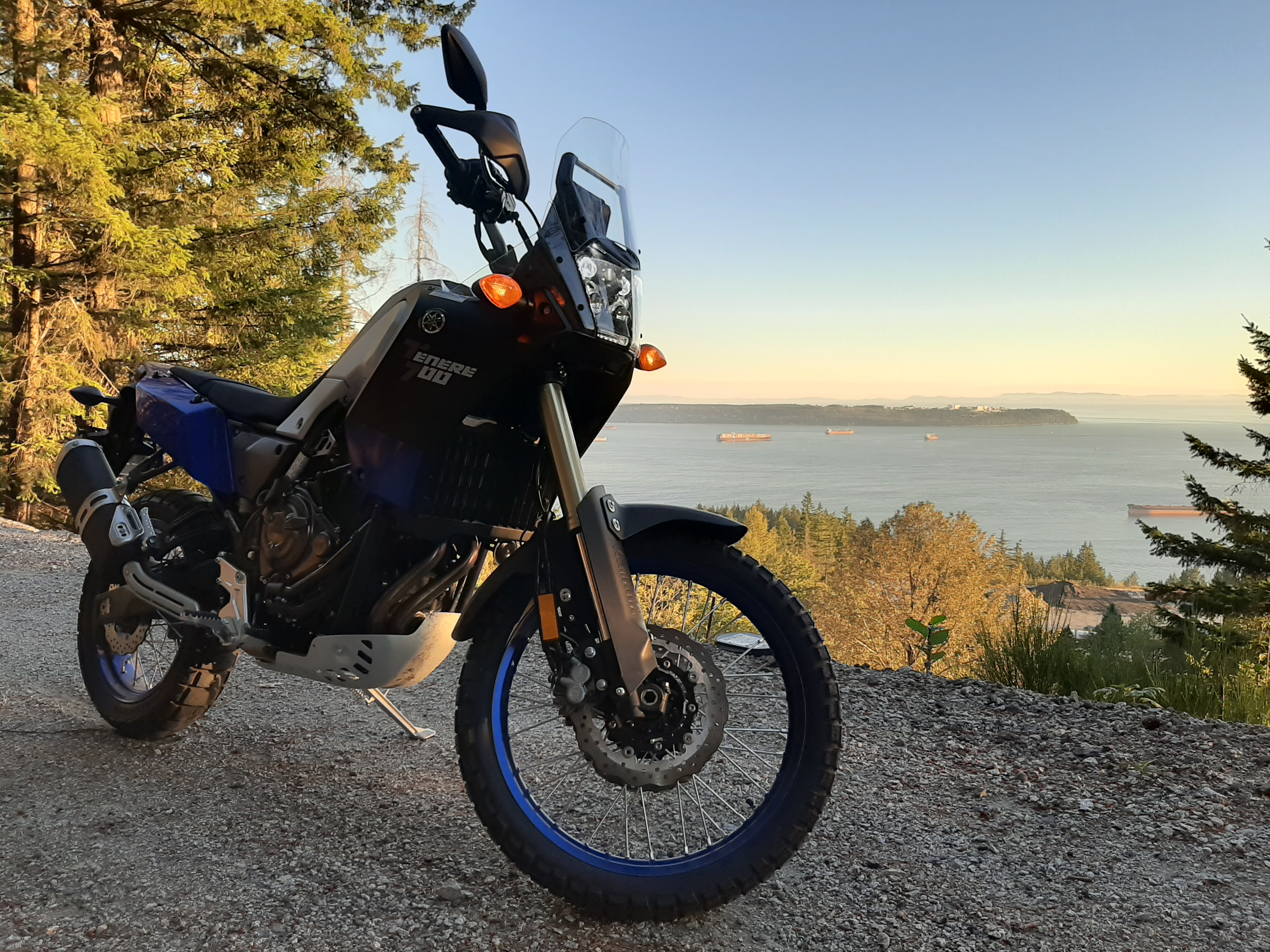
- Manufacturer: Yamaha Motor Company
- Production: Since 2019
- Predecessor: Yamaha XT660Z Ténéré
- Class: Dual-sport
- Engine: 689.6 cc (42.08 cu in) liquid-cooled 4-stroke 8-valve DOHC parallel-twin with crossplane crankshaft
- Bore / stroke: 80.0 mm × 68.6 mm (3.1 in × 2.7 in)
- Compression ratio: 11.5:1
- Power: 53.8 kW (72.1 hp) @ 9,000 rpm
- Torque: 68.00 N⋅m (50.15 lbf⋅ft) @ 5,500 rpm
- Transmission: 6-speed wet multiplate clutch; chain drive
- Suspension: Front: USD Telescopic forks Rear: Monoshock
- Brakes: Front: 282 mm twin discs Rear: 245 mm single disc
- Tires: Front: 90/90R21; Rear: 150/70R18
- Rake, trail: 24.8° / 90 mm (3.5 in)
- Wheelbase: 1,590 mm (63 in)
- Dimensions: L: 2,365 mm (93.1 in); W: 915 mm (36.0 in); H: 1,455 mm (57.3 in)
- Seat height: 875 mm (34.4 in)
- Weight: 205 kg (452 lb) (wet)
- Fuel capacity: 16 L (3.5 imp gal; 4.2 US gal)
- Oil capacity: 3 L (3.2 US qt)
- Related: XT1200Z Super Ténéré, XT660R

The Yamaha Ténéré 700 is a dual-sport motorcycle manufactured by Yamaha since 2019. It features a 689 cc (42.0 cu in) parallel-twin engine which powers the motorcycle through a six-speed gearbox and chain drive. Brakes are equipped with rider-switchable (on-off) ABS.

== History and development ==
The "baby Ténéré" is the latest in a series of dual-sport Yamaha motorcycles named after the Ténéré desert stage of the Dakar Rally in the Sahara. The successor to Yamaha's XT660Z Ténéré was first announced as the T7 concept at the 2016 EICMA with an anticipated production launch in 2018. A refined concept was publicized a year later.

Yamaha announced that delivery of bikes would begin in Europe in July 2019, and only the following year to the USA due to emissions and other regulatory delays. The liquid-cooled 4-stroke 8-valve DOHC engine with crossplane crankshaft was already in use and well reviewed in Yamaha's MT-07 naked and Tracer 700 sport touring bikes.
