= Jawa 700 =

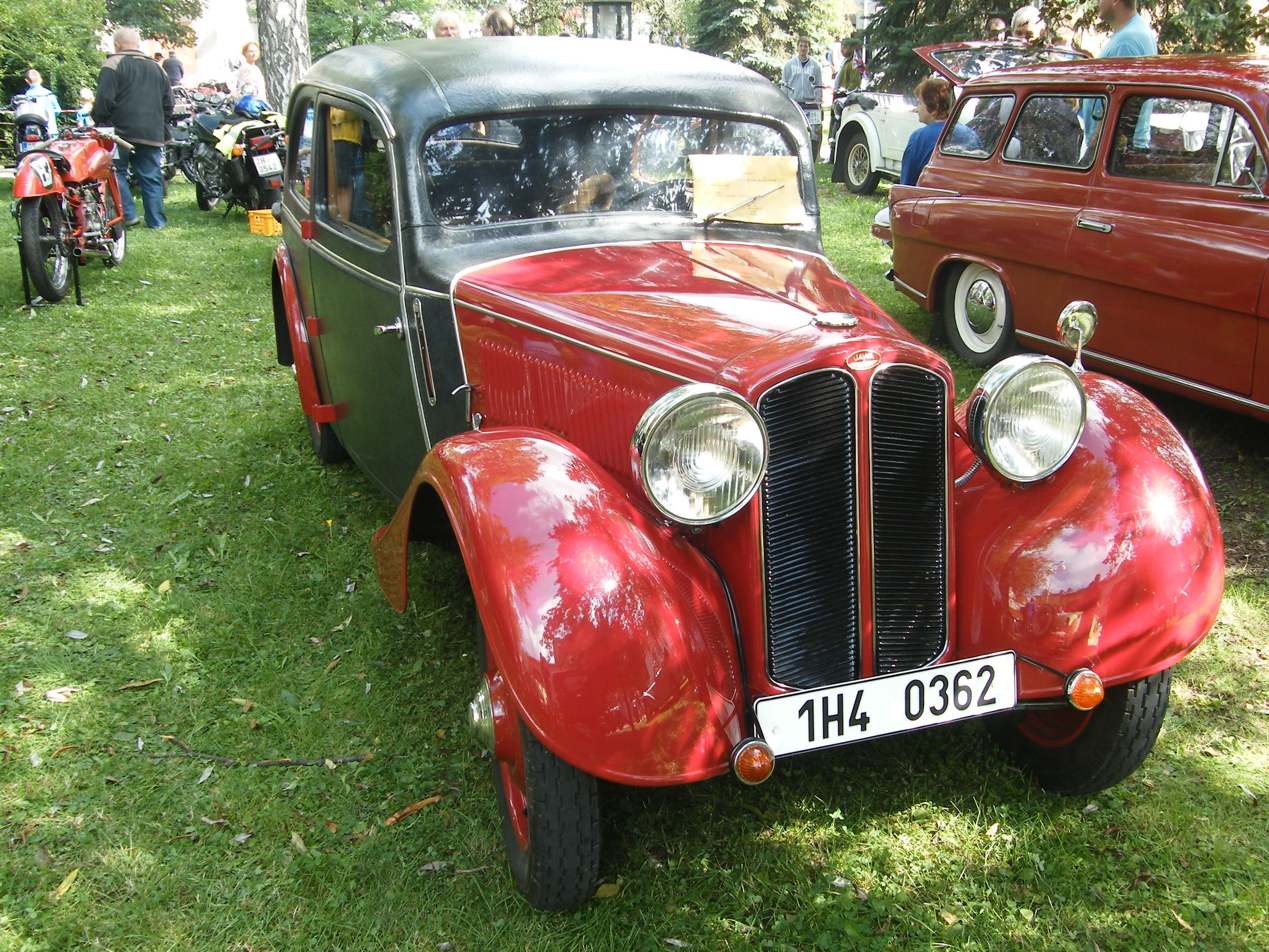
- Jawa 700

Overview
- Manufacturer: Jawa
- Production: 1934–1937
- Assembly: Týnec nad Sázavou, Czechoslovakia

Body and chassis
- Body style: Sedan, roadster
- Layout: Longitudinal front-engine, front-wheel drive

Powertrain
- Engine: 689 cc (42.0 in^{3}) 2 stroke I2
- Transmission: 3 speed manual

Dimensions
- Wheelbase: 2,700 mm (106 in)
- Length: 3,750 mm (148 in) (sedan)
- Width: 1,500 mm (59 in) (sedan)
- Height: 1,600 mm (63 in) (sedan)
- Curb weight: 460 kg (1,014 lb) (chassis); 1,160 kg (2,557 lb) (sedan)

Chronology
- Predecessor: None
- Successor: None

The Jawa 700 is a car produced by Jawa in Czechoslovakia during the 1930s.

== Background ==
František Janeček, the founder of the successful Czech motorcycle manufacturer Jawa, signed a license agreement with Jørgen Skafte Rasmussen of DKW on 20 July 1933 to produce the German company's cars in Czechoslovakia. The first fruit of this agreement was the Jawa 700, based on the DKW F2 Meisterklasse, which was known internally as the 701.

== Design ==
The 700 was a front-wheel drive vehicle with a two stroke engine. It differed from its DKW parent in having a 10 cm (4 in) longer wheelbase and 20 cm (8 in) wheels. Unusually, as cars in Czechoslovakia drove on the left at the time, the car was left hand drive.

== Production ==
The 700 was launched at the 1934 Prague Motor Show. Priced at 22,900 CSK in its four-seater guise, 1,002 vehicles were manufactured before production ceased in June 1937.

== Performance ==
The Jawa 700 could reach a top speed of between 85 and 90 km/h (53 and 56 mph) and had a typical fuel consumption of between 8 and 9 L/100 km (35 and 31 mpg_{‑imp}; 29 and 26 mpg_{‑US}).
