= Jihostroj =

Company in the Czech Republic

Jihostroj a.s.

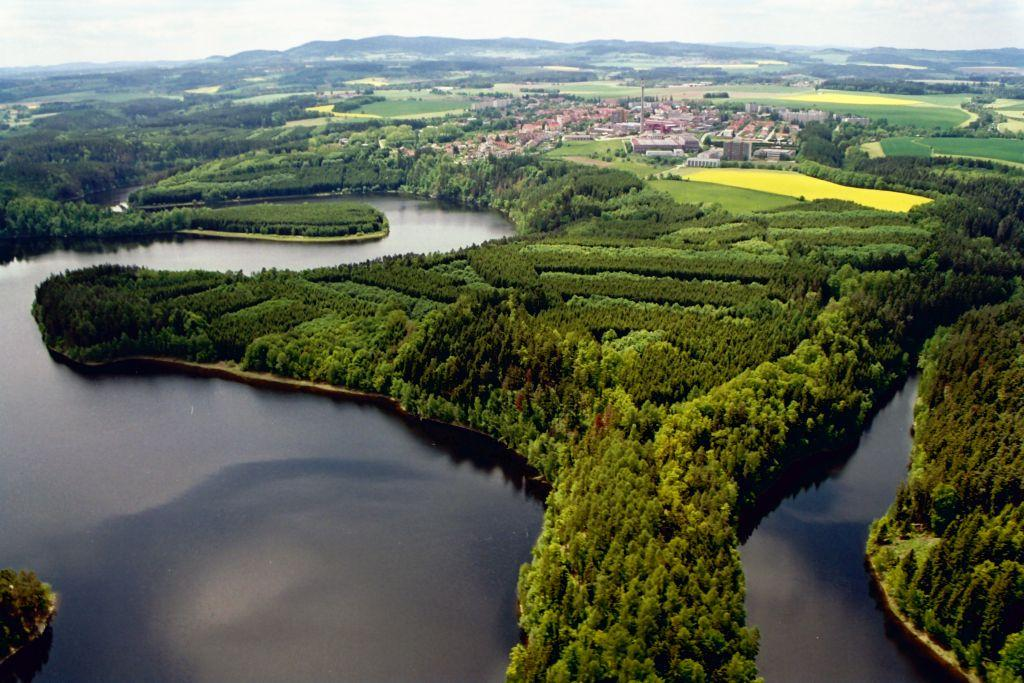
- Jihostroj factory in Velešín
- Type: Joint-stock company
- Industry: Hydraulics; Aerospace
- Predecessor: JIKOV
- Founded: 1919; 107 years ago (as Jevan)
- Headquarters: Velešín, Czech Republic
- Area served: Worldwide
- Key people: Bohdan Gajdušek (CEO)
- Products: Hydraulic pumps and motors; Hydraulic cylinders; Flow dividers; Aircraft fuel pumps and control systems; Propeller governors
- Revenue: 714,551,000 Czech koruna (2020)
- Operating income: 72,552,000 Czech koruna (2020)
- Net income: 47,742,000 Czech koruna (2020)
- Total assets: 1,190,401,000 Czech koruna (2020)
- Number of employees: 430 (2023)
- Parent: JAWAUNION s.r.o.
- Subsidiaries: JISTRO s.r.o.
- Website: www.jihostroj.com

Jihostroj a.s. is a Czech engineering company based in Velešín. It makes hydraulic pumps, motors and cylinders for farm machinery, construction equipment and mining machinery. Its aerospace division produces fuel pumps, fuel-control systems, propeller governors and hydraulic components. It also supplies fuel and oil equipment for auxiliary power units.

The business began in 1919 as Jevan, an electrical and mechanical engineering firm in Velešín.

== History ==
=== Origins and early production ===
Jihostroj traces its origins to Jevan, which began making telephone and telegraph equipment in Velešín in 1919. Jevan merged with Telegrafia in 1920. When Telegrafia moved production to Pardubice in 1925, the factory buildings passed to the brothers Eduard and Emil Štejnar, who manufactured furniture fittings and other metal goods.

Antonín Železný joined the business in 1933, when the factory began making car and aircraft parts. In 1936, he set up a branch called Pomocný letecký průmysl (Auxiliary Aircraft Industry). The business became JIKOV in 1938. During the German occupation, it produced parts for German aircraft.

=== State ownership ===
JIKOV came under state ownership after the war and was incorporated into PAL. The factory joined Motor Union in 1949 and Motorlet in 1951. Two years later, it became a separate national enterprise called Jihočeské strojírny, or Jihostroj.

The factory made engine accessories for the MiG-15 and later supplied components for the Aero L-29 and L-410. Hydraulic production began in 1959 with power-steering equipment for Tatra trucks and hydraulic systems for Zetor tractors. In 1965, Jihostroj became part of the Aero group.

=== Privatization and later development ===
Jihostroj became a joint-stock company in 1992 and went through voucher privatization. Following restructuring, it concentrated production at Velešín in 2001. Linde bought the former Jihostroj factory in Český Krumlov. The Kaplice plant was sold to Engel, an Austrian manufacturer of injection-moulding machines.

The company developed a long-term supply relationship with Parker Aerospace. In 2017, Parker announced that it would manufacture lubrication and scavenge pumps with Jihostroj for GE Aviation’s Advanced Turboprop engine programme.

Jihostroj formerly owned the motorcycle manufacturer Jawa Moto. Following restructuring in 2021, Jawa Moto became a sister company. In 2022, Jihostroj began supplying fuel-system components for Aero Vodochody’s L-39NG trainer. The following year, it began serial production of components for the auxiliary power unit of the South Korean KF-21 Boramae fighter.

== Products ==
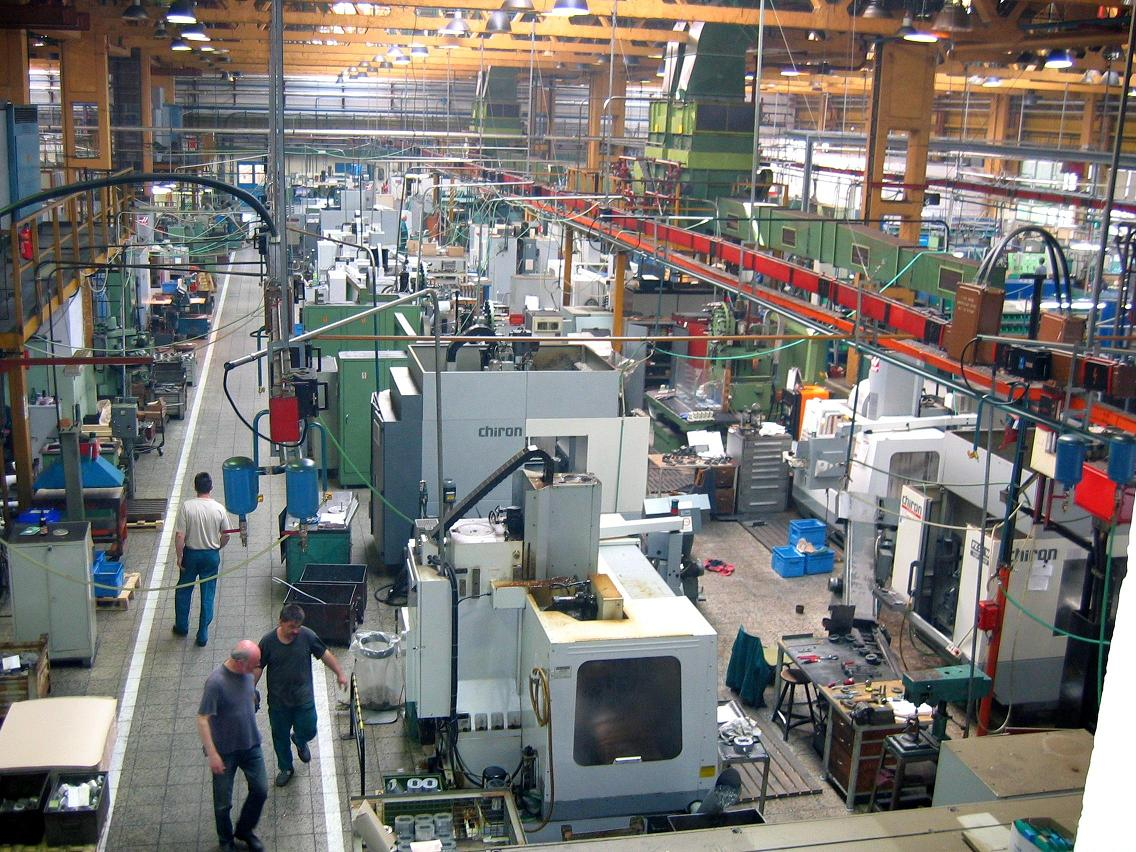
Jihostroj a.s., main facility of hydraulic division

Jihostroj manufactures hydraulic equipment and aircraft components at its factory in Velešín. Hydraulics accounted for 62% of its turnover in 2023, while aerospace contributed 25%.

=== Hydraulics ===
Jihostroj’s hydraulic pumps, motors, flow dividers and cylinders are used in farm machinery, construction equipment and mining machinery. It also makes heavy-duty pumps with cast-iron housings for crushers and screening machines.

=== Aerospace ===
Jihostroj makes fuel pumps and control units for aircraft engines, including the Walter M601 and GE H-series turboprops and the Honeywell TFE731 turbofan.

PBS, Safran and Hanwha use Jihostroj’s fuel and oil components in their auxiliary power units, which supply power on the ground and help start the aircraft’s main engines.

Jihostroj supplies the FMP130 fuel pump for the Leonardo AW189 helicopter’s e-APU60 auxiliary power unit. UNIS makes the electronics that control the pump. In 2023, Jihostroj began producing APU components in series for the South Korean KF-21 Boramae fighter.

Another part of the business is propeller governors, which keep propellers running at the selected speed by adjusting their blade angle. Jihostroj makes governors for turboprop and piston-engine aircraft, which are used with Rotax engines and Woodcomp propellers.

The company also makes pumps, filters and valves for aircraft fuel systems, including equipment for ground refuelling and fuel-tank pressure protection. Its fuel-system components are used on the Aero L-39NG.

== Research and development ==
Between 2016 and 2020, Jihostroj led PROPCONEL, a project funded through the European Union’s Clean Sky 2 programme. It developed a propeller-control unit that used electric actuators together with mechanical and hydraulic controls. It also developed a governor to stop the propeller from exceeding its speed limit. The components were tested at Safran Helicopter Engines’ ground-test facility.

Jihostroj also worked with Woodcomp and the Czech Aerospace Research Centre (VZLU) on ARGOS, a project to develop a propeller and governor for diesel aircraft engines. The work addressed the stresses caused by engine vibrations, with prototypes undergoing engine tests.
