= Yamaha XT660Z Ténéré =

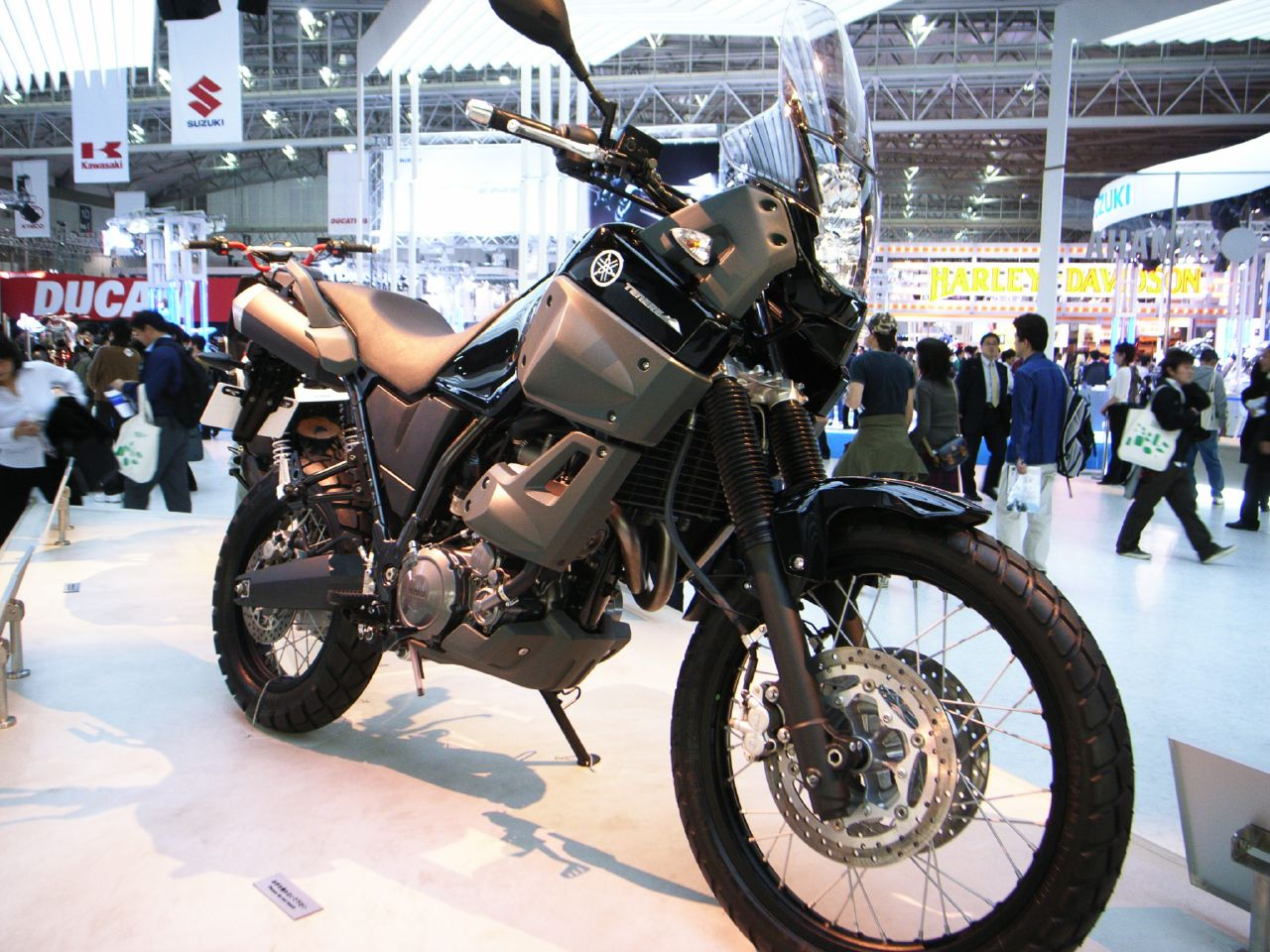
- Manufacturer: Yamaha Motor Company
- Production: 2008–2016
- Predecessor: Yamaha XTZ 660
- Successor: Yamaha Ténéré 700
- Class: Dual-sport
- Engine: 660 cc liquid-cooled, 4-stroke, SOHC, single-cylinder, 4-valve, fuel injected,
- Bore / stroke: 100.0 mm × 84.0 mm (3.94 in × 3.31 in)
- Compression ratio: 10.0:1
- Power: 35 kW (47 hp) @ 6,000 rpm
- Torque: 58 N⋅m (43 lbf⋅ft) @ 5,500 rpm
- Transmission: 5-speed chain drive
- Suspension: Front: Telescopic forks Rear: Monoshock
- Brakes: Front: 298 mm twin discs Rear: 245 mm single disc
- Tyres: Front: 90/90R21; Rear: 130/80R17; Spoked tubed wheels
- Rake, trail: 28° / 113 mm (4.4 in)
- Wheelbase: 1,500 mm (59 in)
- Dimensions: L: 2,260 mm (89 in); W: 895 mm (35.2 in); H: 1,500 mm (59 in)
- Seat height: 895 mm (35.2 in)
- Weight: 206 kg (454 lb) (wet)
- Fuel capacity: 23 L (5.1 imp gal; 6.1 US gal)
- Oil capacity: 2.6 L (2.7 US qt)
- Related: XT1200Z Super Ténéré, XT660R

The Yamaha XT660Z Ténéré is a dual-sport motorcycle manufactured from 2008 to 2016 by Yamaha. It featured a 660 cc (40 cu in) single-cylinder engine manufactured by Minarelli, which was also used in the XT660R, XT660X, MT-03 ( 2006–2014), Jawa 660 Sportard, Jawa 660 Vintage and Aprilia Pegaso 650 Trail (post 2007) models. Though not sold in the US or Canada and some 40 kilos heavier than the original, air-cooled Ténéré from the early 1980s, many fans saw the 660Z as a return to form for Yamaha, following the demise of the air-cooled Teneres and the less popular 5-valve iteration which replaced them. The low-rpm electronic fuel injection glitches present in previously listed machines using the same, 660 engine were ironed out and the 660Z could reliably average 4 L/100km (72mpg Imperial, 60mpg US)""user averages closer to 55MPG imperial"". which equated to 600 km or nearly 400 miles on a single tank. Other notable qualities included its strong rear subframe, 23-litre tank and effective fairing.

At the EICMA 2016 the concept bike T7 was unveiled – a dirt-oriented enduro, and an official press release indicates additionally the coming of a more street oriented supermoto. Yamaha further developed the T7 into the Ténéré 700 World Raid Concept and finally released the finished buyable Ténéré 700 in 2019.
