= Jawa Moto =

Czech motorcycle & machinery company

JAWA Moto
- Founded: 1929; 97 years ago
- Founder: František Janeček
- Headquarters: Týnec nad Sázavou, Czech Republic
- Products: Motorcycles, mopeds
- Total assets: 313,425,000 Czech koruna (2022)
- Number of employees: 100 (as of 2017)
- Parent: Jihostroj

JAWA (Czech pronunciation: [java]) is a motorcycle and moped manufacturer founded in Prague, Czechoslovakia, in 1929 by František Janeček, who bought the motorcycle division of Wanderer. The name JAWA was established by concatenating the first letters of Janeček and Wanderer. In the past, especially in the 1950s, JAWA was one of the top motorcycle manufacturers and exported its 350 model to over 120 countries. The best known model was the 350 Pérák, and in the 1970s the 350 Californian. It appeared in typical black and red coloring from the US to New Zealand. After 1990 a significant loss of production occurred. A successor company was formed in 1997 in Týnec nad Sázavou, continuing the name as JAWA Moto.

In the Indian market the brand JAWA Motorcycles was resurrected in December 2018 by Classic Legends, which is owned by Mahindra & Mahindra, through a licensing deal with the original Czech company JAWA Moto.

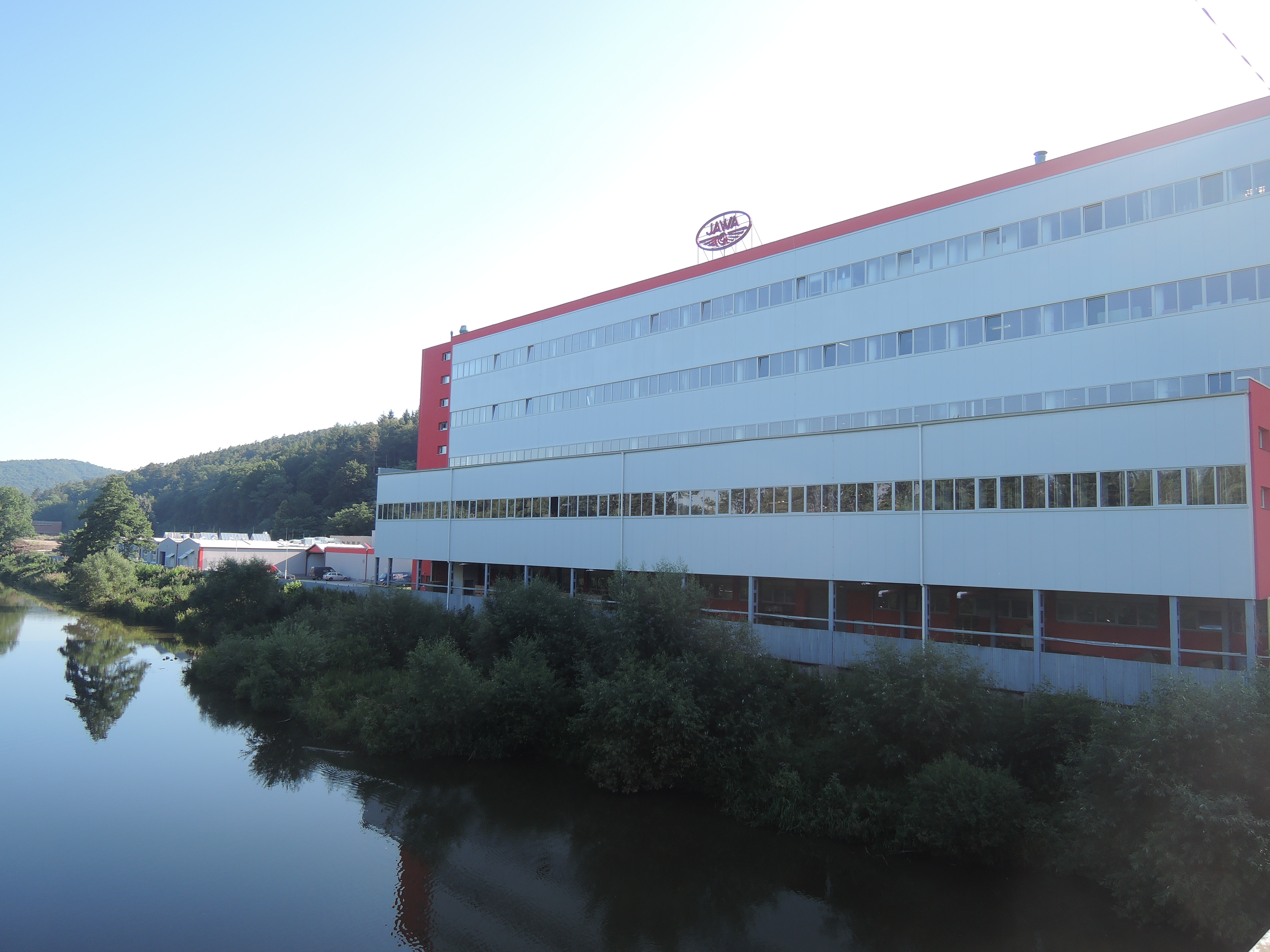
Jawa headquarters in Týnec nad Sázavou

== History ==
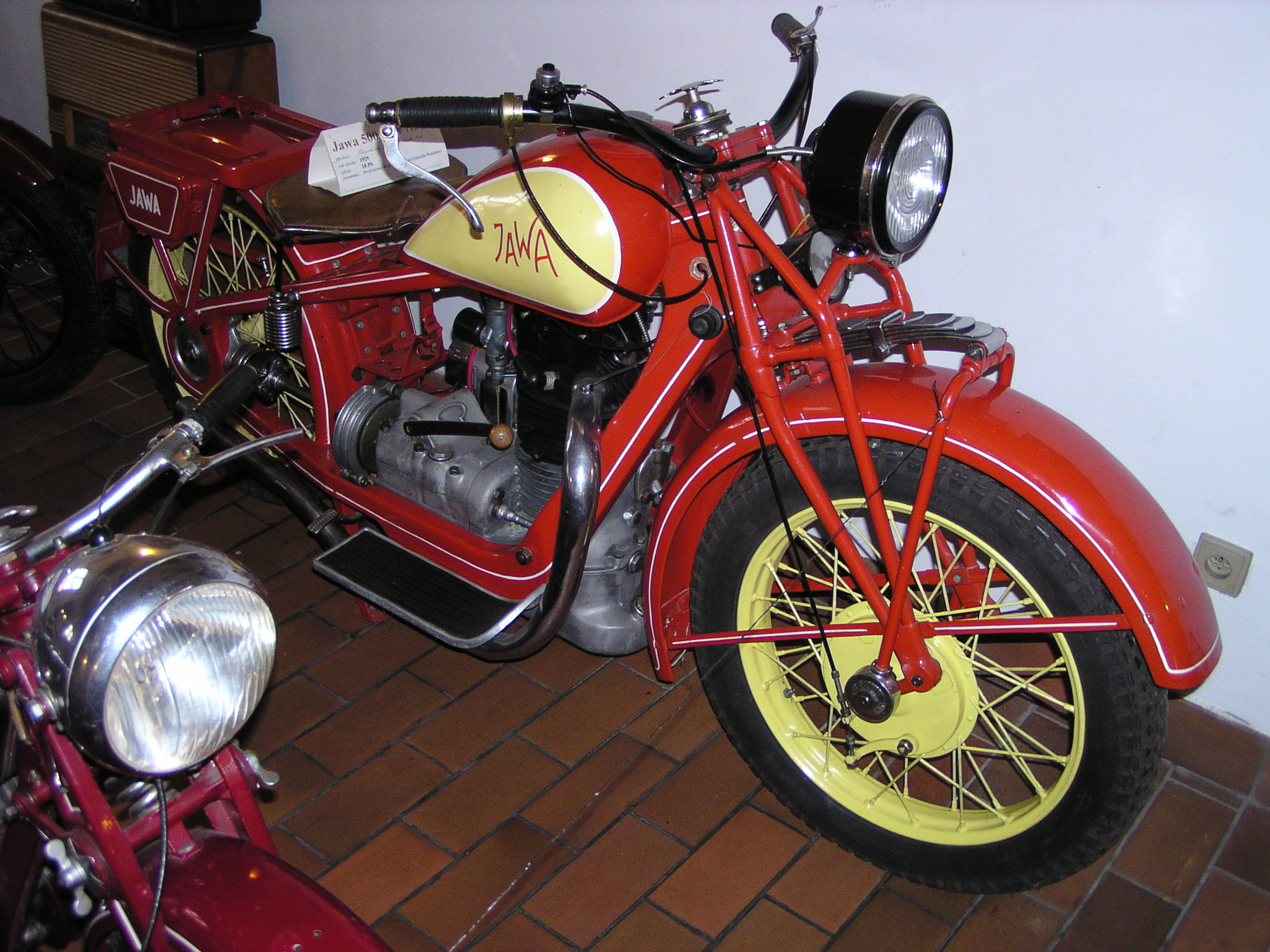
JAWA 500 OHV in a museum of historic motorcycles in Lesná, Czech Republic

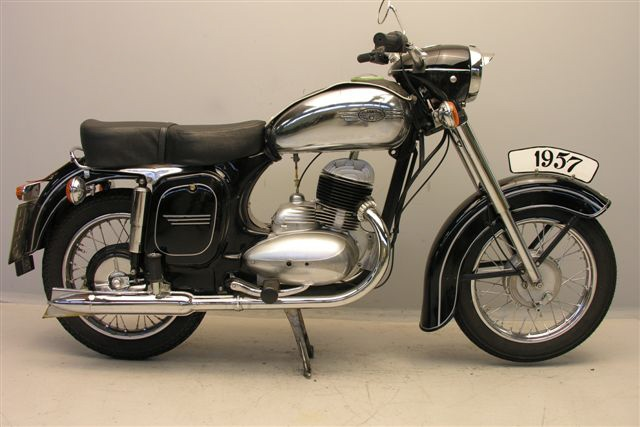
JAWA 250 (type 353) two-stroke motorcycle

Jawa 250 motorbike exhaust sound (single-cylinder)

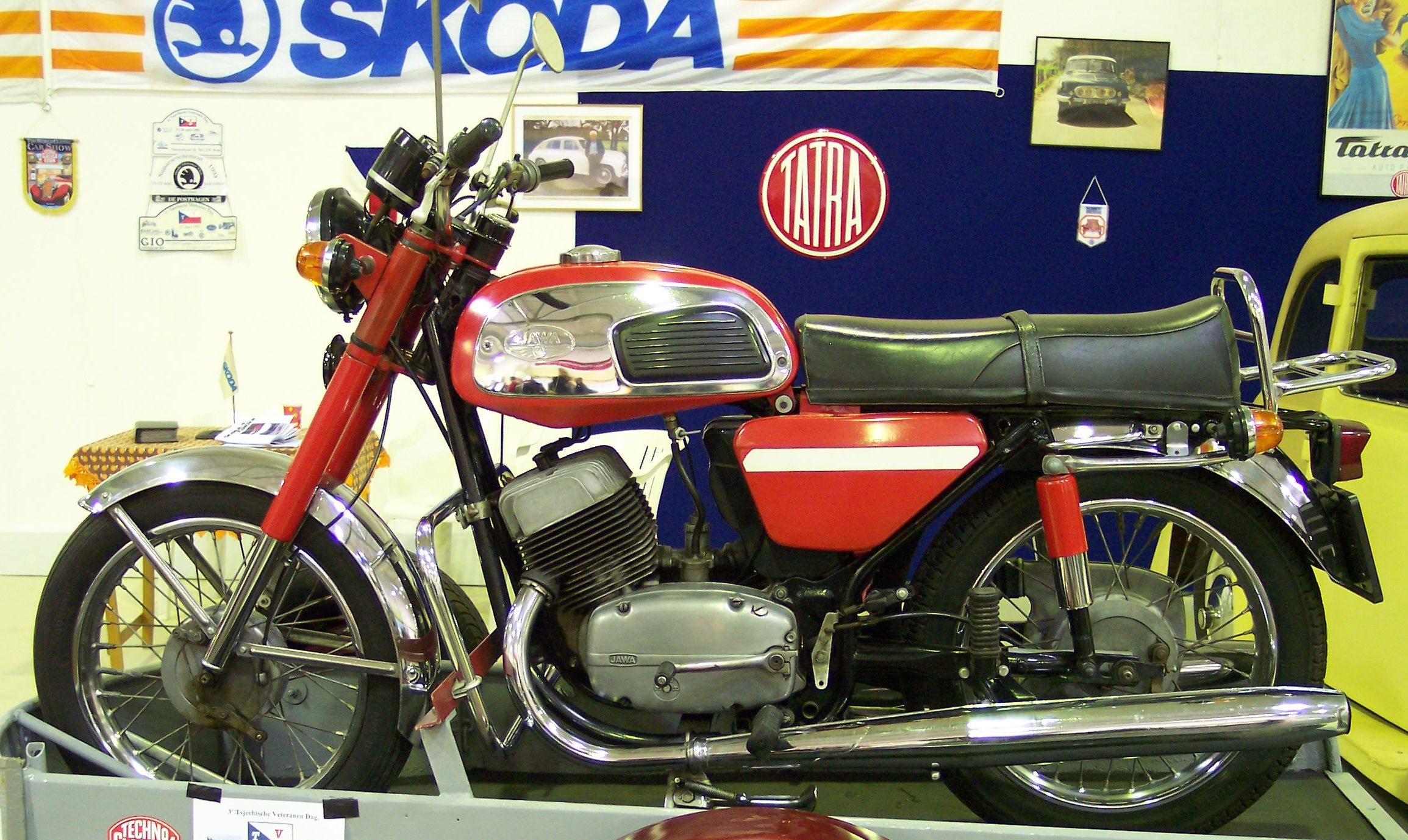
JAWA 350 (type 634)

Jawa 350 type 354/06 motorbike exhaust sound (two-cylinder)

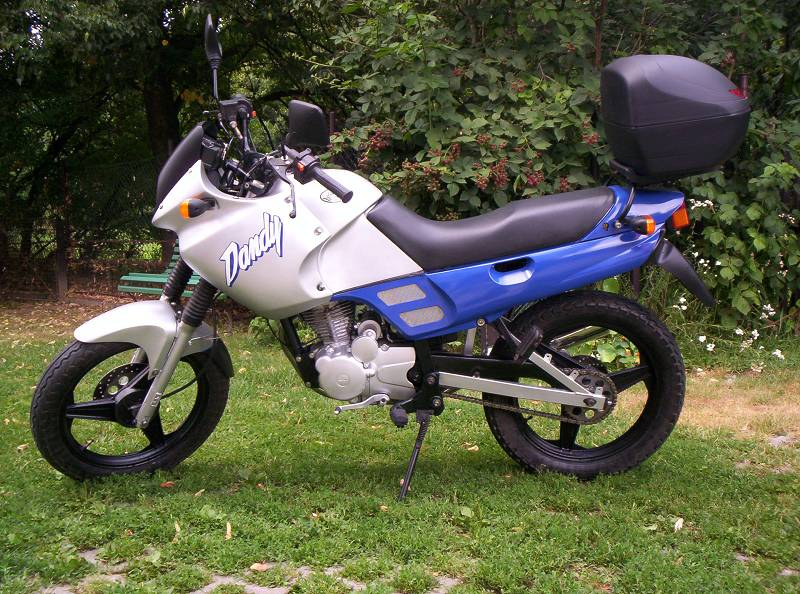
JAWA 125 Dandy

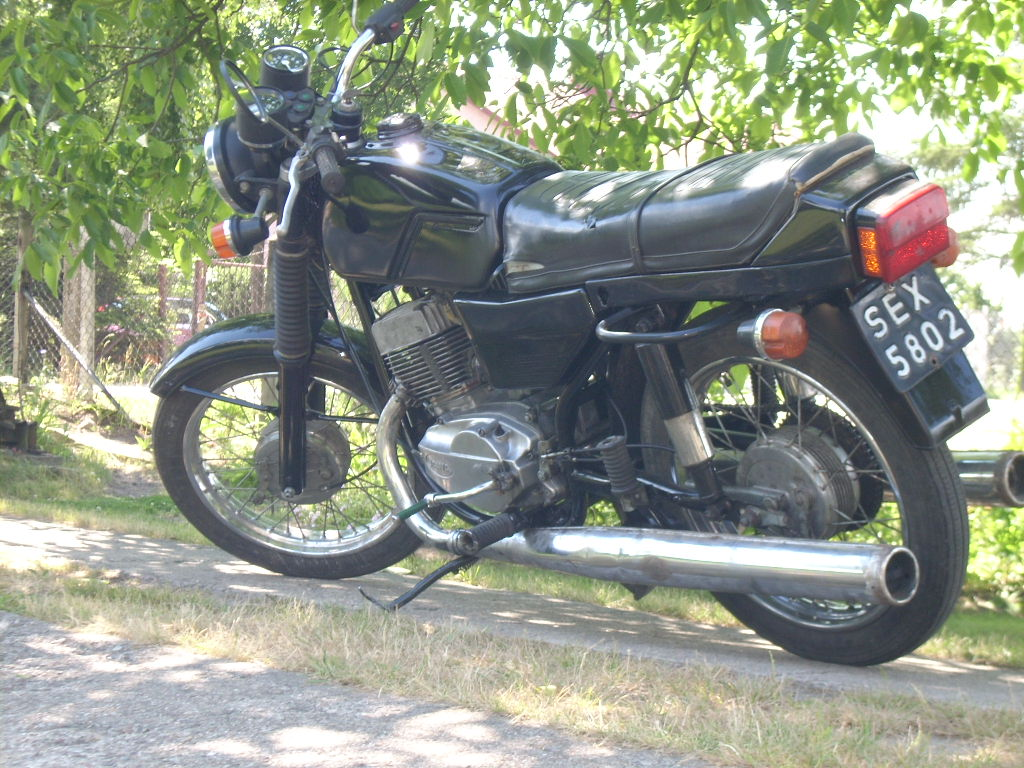
Jawa 350/638 Twin Sport (1984–1994)

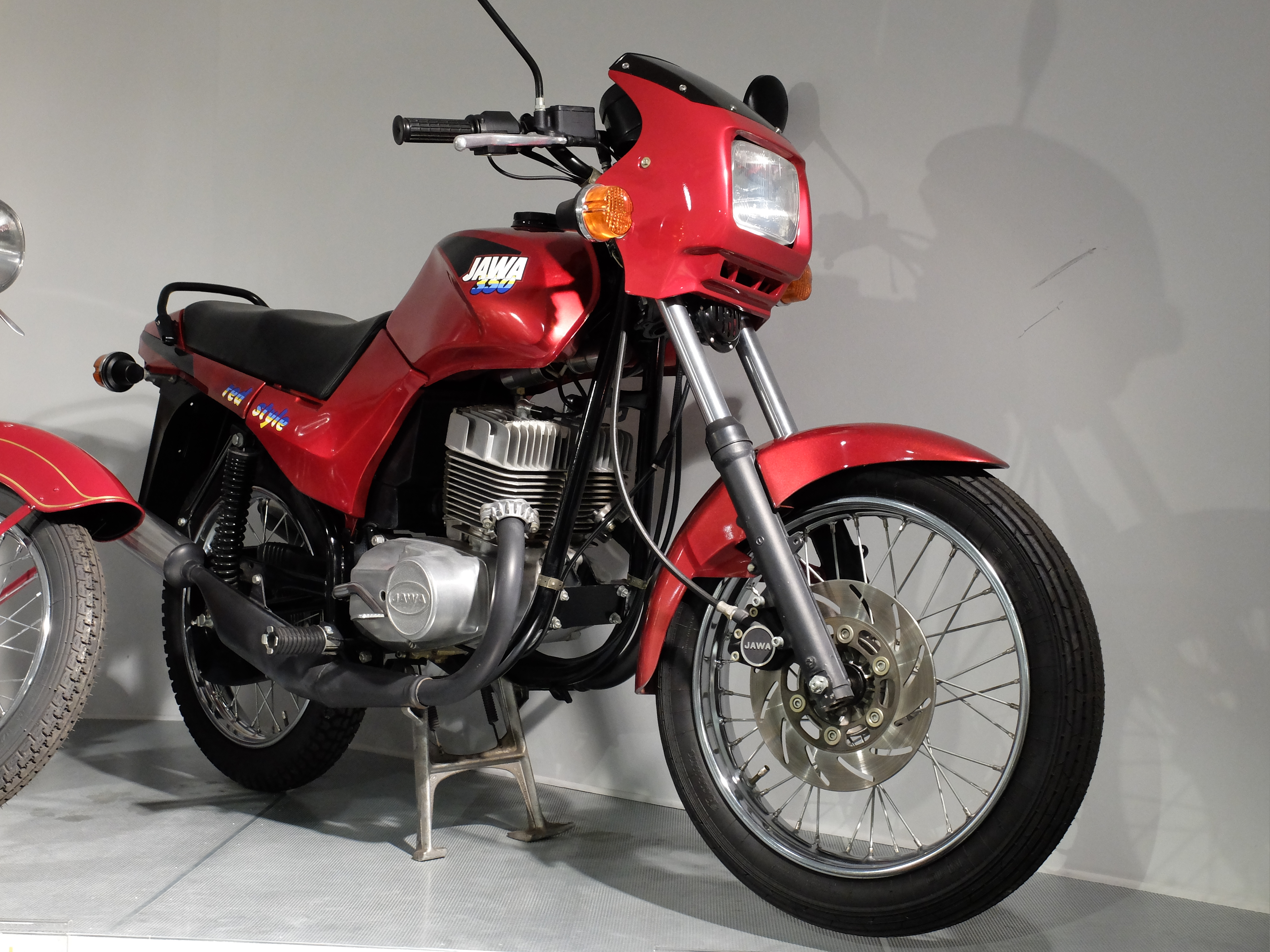
Jawa 350/640 Style

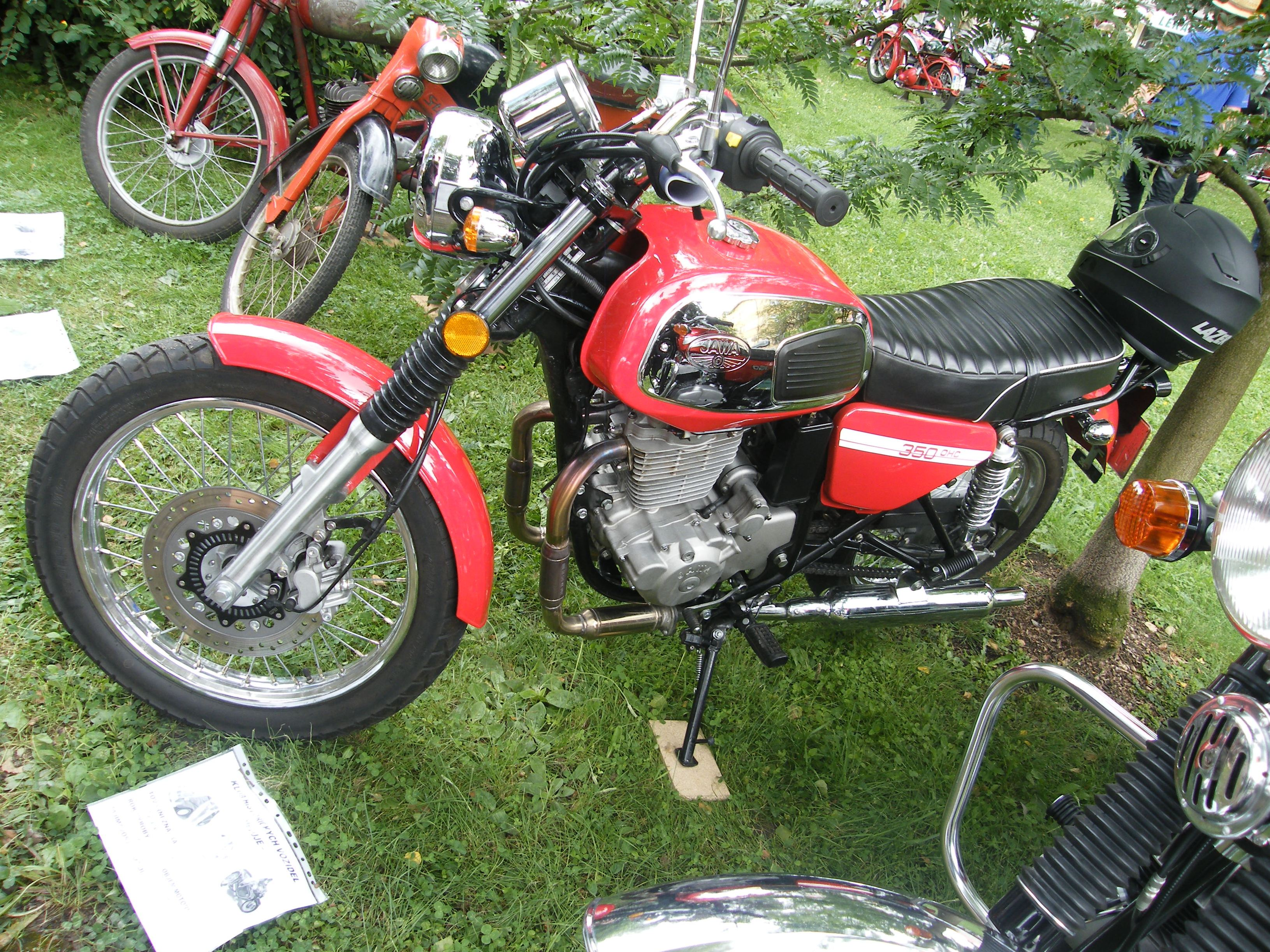
Jawa 350 OHC

=== Origin – 1929 ===
František Janeček started the company after working in the armament industry. Although he did not have experience with motorcycles, he was familiar with production techniques. Janeček chose between the Austrian double piston two-stroke motor of Puch, the Berlin two-stroke of Schliha, and the new Wanderer 500cc. Janeček chose the Wanderer. Because of the collapse of the German motor industry, Wanderer had stopped production, being unable to compete with BMW. The first model was introduced on October 23, 1929. This was a 500cc four-cycle engine with 12 kW of power (18 hp) and fuel consumption of 6 L/100 km. Although priced highly, through the first years (and several constructional fixes), this motorcycle was successful and was considered reliable.

=== 1930s ===
Due to the economic recession of the early 1930s, a cheaper and simpler motorcycle was needed. The year 1932 marked the introduction of JAWA 175, with its 3.6-kW engine. This light (70 kg) machine was capable of speeds up to 80 km/h and fuel consumption of 3.5 L/100 km. The first year of production was an immediate success, selling over 3000 of the JAWA 175, almost three times the number of the 500-cc model over three years of production. The production of this model ended in 1946. In 1938, JAWA was the first to offer test rides during exhibition shows. This test motorcycle was a custom JAWA 175 equipped with dual handlebars, a second pair in the back for the instructor. Over the years, 27,535 units of the JAWA 175 were built.

=== 1940s ===
The company founder František Janeček died. Postwar production of JAWA 250/350 motorcycles restarted, and production of the JAWA 350 Ogar motorcycle began.

=== 1950s ===
Motorcycles produced in the 1950s include the 250, 350/353-Kývačka, and 350/354-Kývačka, 500 OHC and the 50 Pionýr and Jawetta mopeds. A powerful two-stroke motorcycle known as the JAWA 250/350 with the compact engine, rear suspension and many other innovations was exported to more than 120 countries. It was one of the most successful models of JAWA.

=== 1960s ===
In the early 1960s, Jawa invented the first automatic clutch for motorcycles. The centrifugal clutch was designed for Jawa 250/559 and 350/360. Because the clutch has been patented worldwide by Jawa and it was copied in the Honda 50 Cub motorcycle, Honda had to retreat, pay a fine, and pay a license fee for each motorcycle sold.

- 1962, Amalgamation with ESO in production of JAWA speedway motorcycles
- 1963, Closure of JAWA plant in Prague – Pankrác
- 1964, Start of production in new plant at Týnec nad Sázavou
- 1964, Production of millionth JAWA brand motorcycle
- 1965, Start of production of JAWA 350 Automatic motorcycles
- 1966, Start of production of JAWA 350 Californian (type 363) motorcycles
- 1967, Start of production of SK 90 / JAWA 90 in Považská Bystrica (cross, trail, roadster)
- 1967, Start of production of JAWA 50 Mustang (type 23) in Považská Bystrica

=== 1970s ===
- 1970, Start of production of JAWA 250/350 ÚŘ motorcycles
- 1972, jawa 250cc in market (Indian)
- 1970, Start of production of JAWA 350 Bizon motorcycles
- 1974, Start of production of JAWA 350 (type 634) motorcycles
- 1976, Production of two millionth JAWA brand motorcycle

=== 1980s ===
- 1984, Start of production of JAWA 350 (type 638) motorcycles
- 1987, Production of three millionth JAWA brand motorcycle

=== 1990s ===
- 1991, Start of production of JAWA 350 (type 640) motorcycles
- 1994, Start of production of JAWA 250 (type 593) motorcycles
- 1994, Start of production of JAWA 50 (type 585, 586) motorcycles
- 1997, Founding of the company JAWA Moto spol. s r. o.
- 1998, Start of production of JAWA 125 Travel motorcycles
- 1998, Joining with MOTOUNION, take-over of bike MUC 125 Dandy production
- 1998, Start of production of JAWA 125 Dandy motorcycles
- 1999, Start of production of JAWA 100 (type 587) motorcycles

=== 2000s ===
- 2004, Start of production of JAWA 650 (type 836) and JAWA 650 Classic motorcycles
- 2005, Start of production of JAWA 650 Style motorcycles
- 2006, Start of production of JAWA 650 Dakar motorcycles
- 2008, Start of production of JAWA 250 Travel motorcycles

=== 2010s ===
- 2011, Start of production of JAWA 660 Sportard motorcycles (successor to 650 Dakar)
- 2013, Start of production of JAWA 350/634 Retro motorcycles
- 2017, Start of production of Jawa 350 OHC and JAWA 660 Vintage

=== 2020s ===
- 2024, Start of production of Jawa 400 Geeny
- 2025, Start of production of Jawa JD 750

== Other activities ==
=== JAWA automobiles ===
In 1934, Jawa introduced its first car, the Jawa 700, based on the DKW F2. Overall, 1,002 vehicles were produced. The sports car special Jawa 750 was built only in six pieces for the 1000-mile Czechoslovak race in 1933–35. It is a legend in the history of domestic motor sports. In 1937, the modified Jawa 600 Minor was introduced, which replaced JAWA 700. Production continued in limited numbers during WWII, and some were assembled in the postwar period. The successor was the Aero Minor; it was, however, manufactured by Aero and not by Jawa, from 1946 to 1952. Over 14,000 vehicles were produced and more than half were exported abroad.

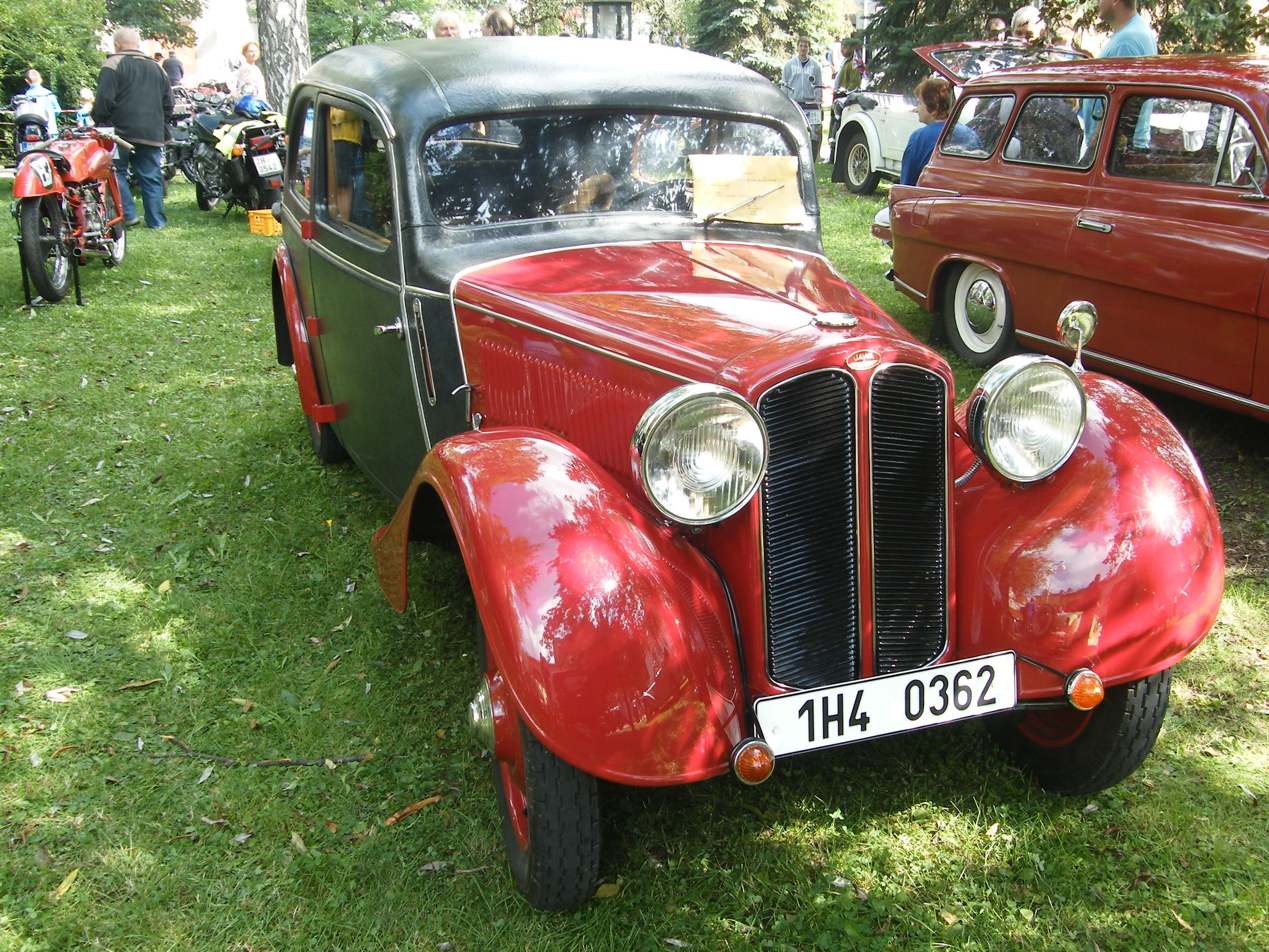
Jawa 700

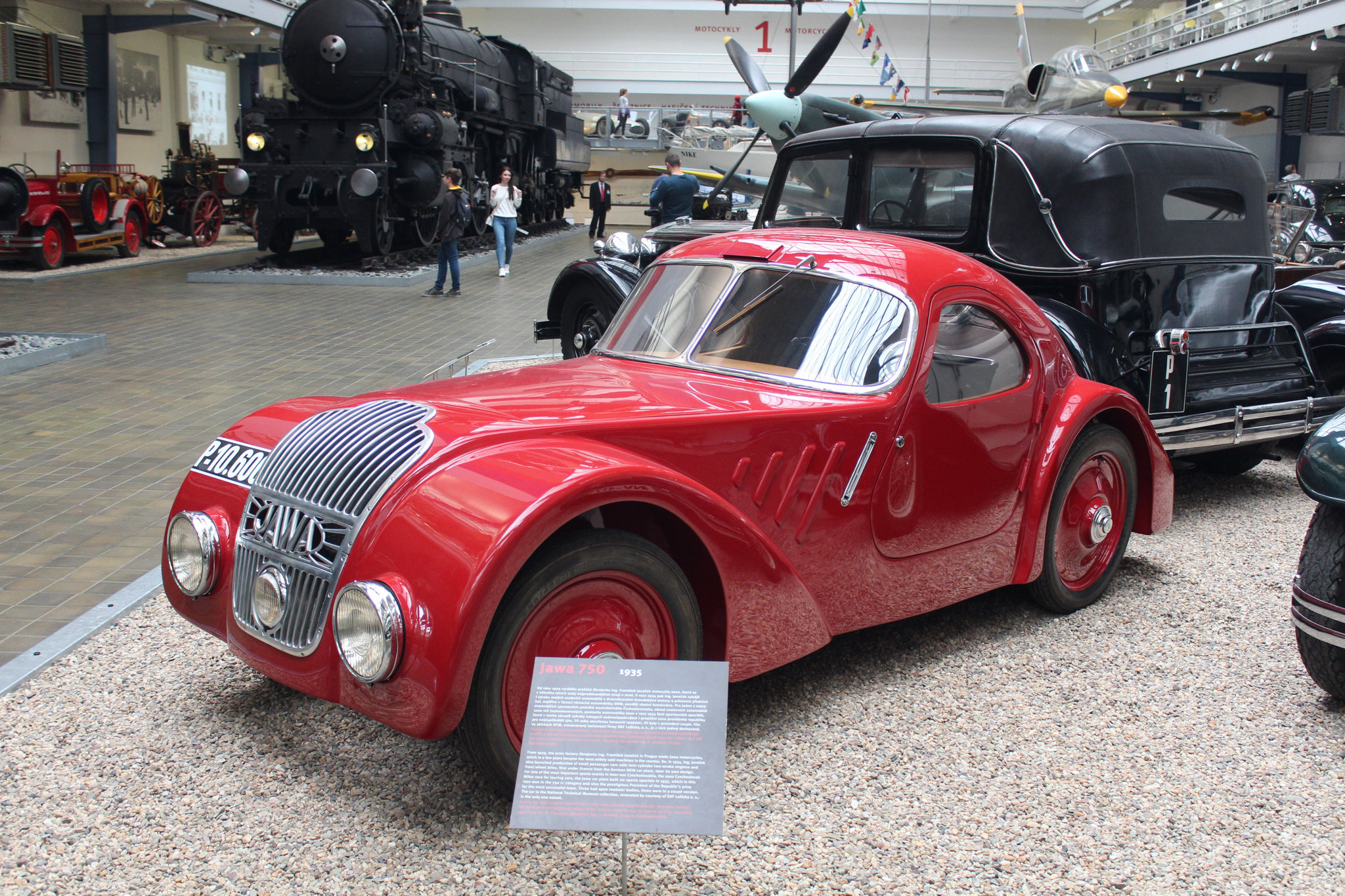
Jawa 750

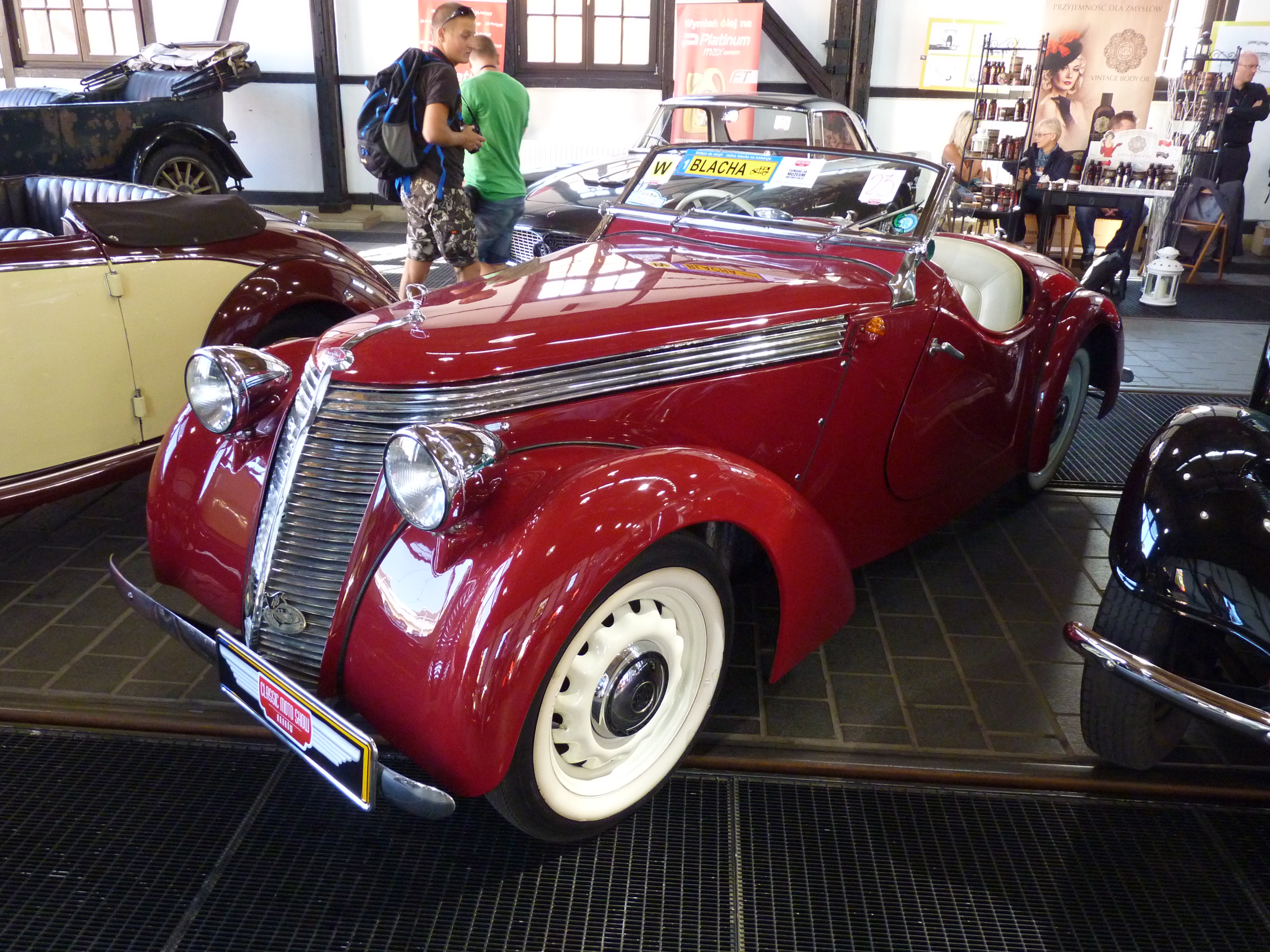
Jawa 600 Minor

=== JAWA mopeds - Babetta ===
Under the Jawa name, a variety of mopeds with two-stroke engines were sold in foreign markets. In Czechoslovakia (and foreign markets after 1989), these mopeds were known as the Babetta. The mopeds were produced since 1970 in Slovak Považská Bystrica and Kolárovo. It was the first company to include electronic ignition on mopeds. In the first half of the 1990s, sales and exports declined, and the production of Babettas (with type's 192 Sting and 134 Hooper) was discontinued in 1999.

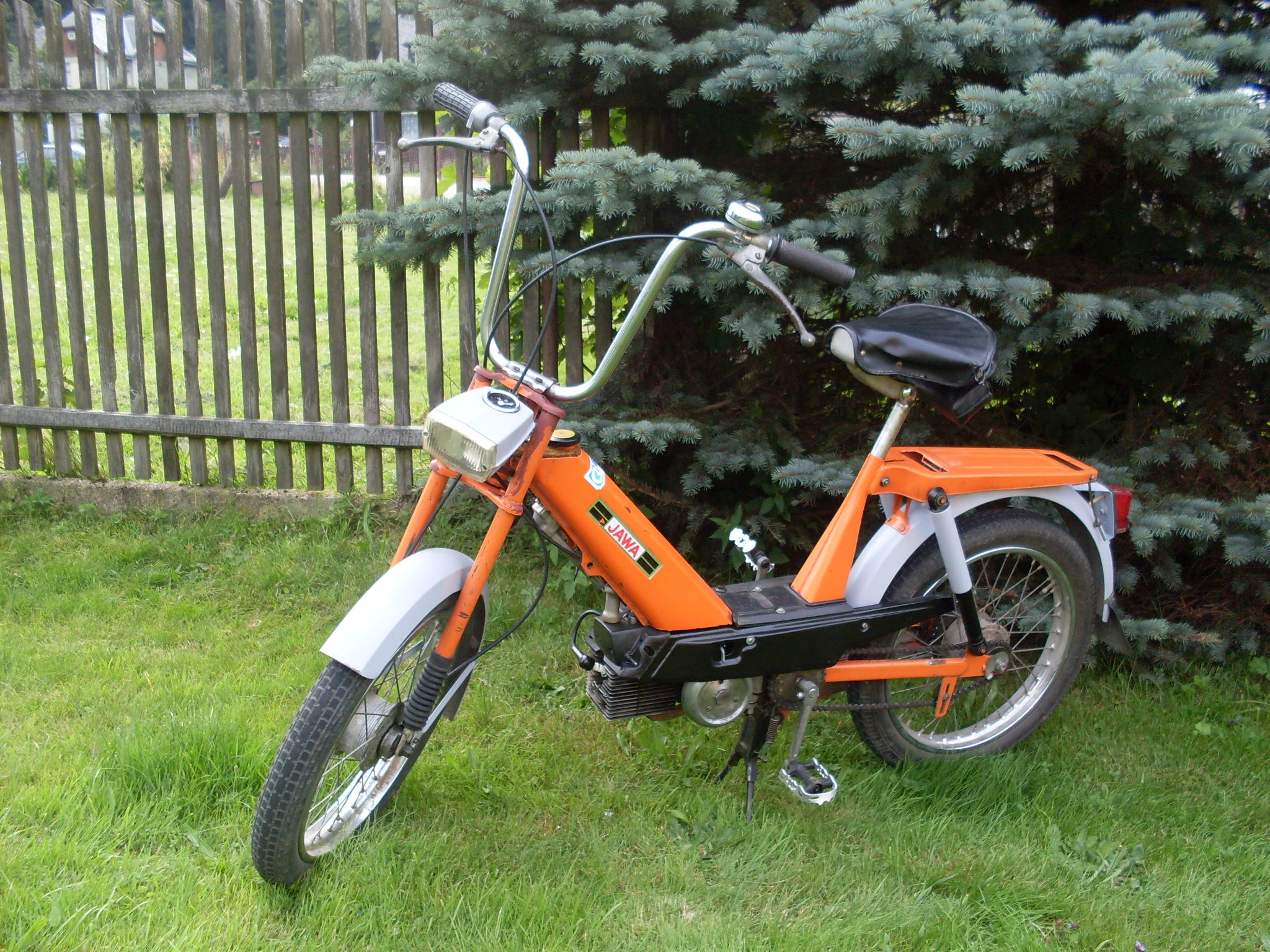
Babetta 207

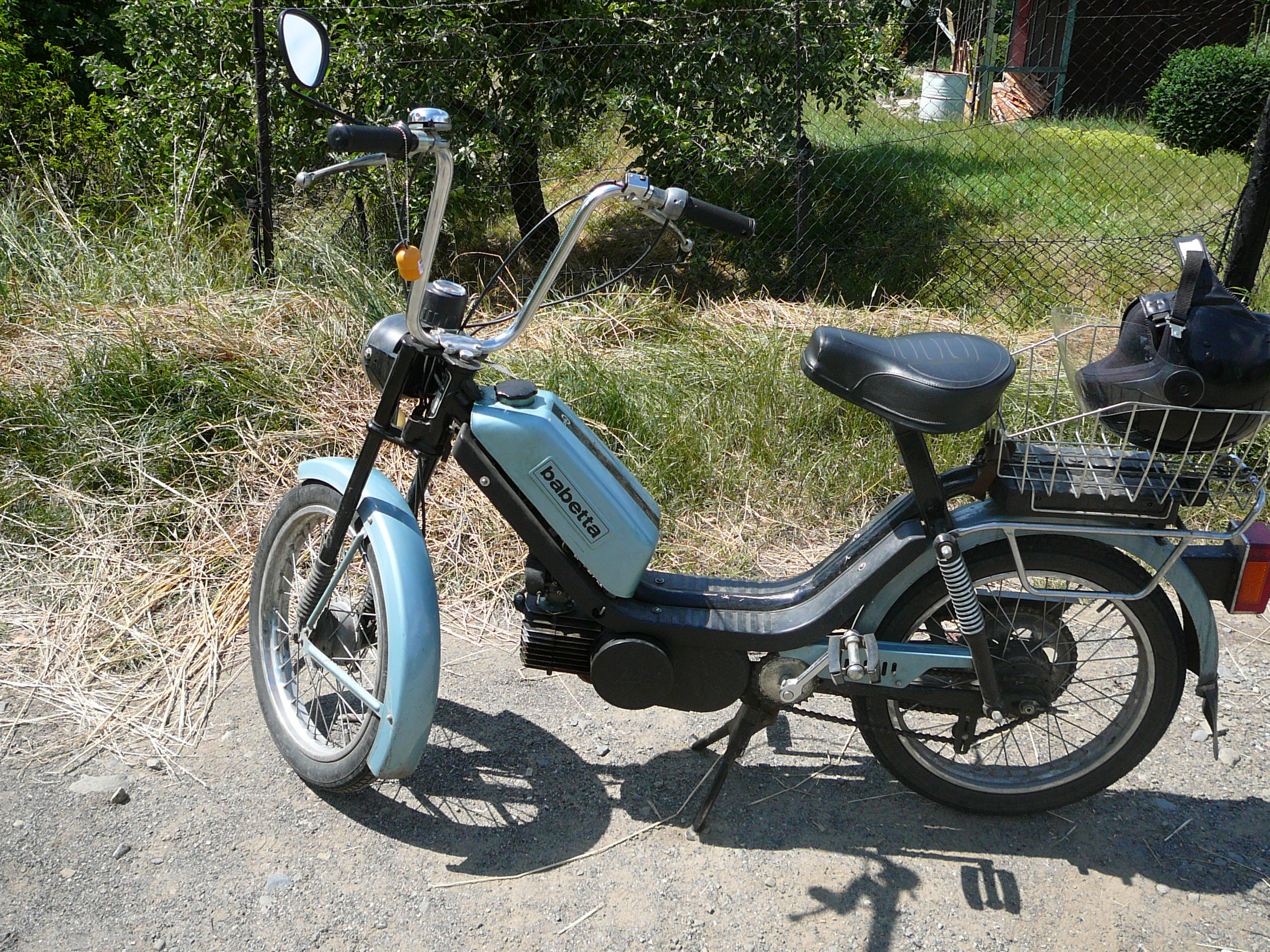
Babetta 210

=== JAWA in India ===
Ideal Jawa India Ltd based in Mysore was an Indian motorcycle company, which produced licensed Jawa motorcycles beginning in 1960 under the brand name Jawa and from 1973 as Yezdi. The company stopped production in 1996. Jawa motorcycles have a cult following to this day. Earlier models manufactured in Czechoslovakia bore the CZ Jawa emblem on the side of the fuel tank. The locally manufactured models always had O within the Jawa emblem. The Jawa 250 Type 353/04 designated as 'A' Type, Yezdi 250 'B' Type, Jawa 350 type 634 Twin and Yezdi 250 Monarch models are currently ridden in the country. Jawa and Yezdi bikes, especially ones with fuel tank paddings and ignition systems on the fuel tank, are collector's items.

In October 2016, Mahindra & Mahindra, through its subsidiary Classic Legends Private Limited (CLPL), signed a licensing deal to launch motorbikes under the JAWA brand name in India and other East Asian countries. On November 15, 2018, the Classic Legends launched three motorcycles in India: Jawa (nicknamed Jawa 300), Forty-Two (named for the answer to the Ultimate Question of Life, the Universe, and Everything), and Pérák, named for the Czech mythical figure Pérák. The 42 was introduced in 2021, it is the Forty-Two with modified appearance and equipment. In October 2022 the 42 Bobber was introduced. It uses the same engine as the Pérák but comes with more chrome and color options. They are manufactured in Pithampur.

The Jawa 300 is inspired by the company's popular classic Jawa 250 Type A, while the Jawa 42 and Forty-Two are more modern and urban offerings. The Jawa Pérák is a completely different model, a custom bobber motorcycle. Jawa, Forty-Two and 42 share the same technical specifications - 293-cc (20,4 kW), front disc, rear drum, single-channel ABS, fuel injection system, liquid-cooled engine with radiator, and kerb weight of 170 kg. In terms of appearance, classic Jawa has more chrome, while the Jawa Forty-Two and 42 have a modern feel to attract younger riders. It is a competitor to the Royal Enfield Classic 350 in the Indian market. Jawa Pérák has a 334-cc (22,3 kW) engine.

Indian customers' interest in new machines exceeded expectations. The originally planned production capacity was not enough, so the production line was doubled at about 30,000 motorcycles annually, and the start of production was delayed. Classic Legends inaugurated the first Jawa motorcycles in December 2018 in the Pune region of Maharashtra. Despite the COVID-19 pandemic, Jawa sold 50,000 motorcycles in twelve months, with plans to increase production capacity to meet demand.

They launched an initiative #ForeverHeroes to lend a helping hand to the children of martyrs, by auctioning the first 13 motorcycles from its production batch. This fundraiser was a first-of-its-kind event, which helped Jawa raise Rs 1,49,25,000 from 13 bikes. The entire amount received in the fundraising auction will be used for education of the children of martyrs of the Indian Armed Forces.

Indian Jawa adapted to the European standards is sold in the Czech Republic since autumn 2020, under the name Jawa 300 CL. The Jawa 42 should also be imported here over time. Classic Legends recently launched its Jawa 42 Bobber in October 2022.

== Racing ==
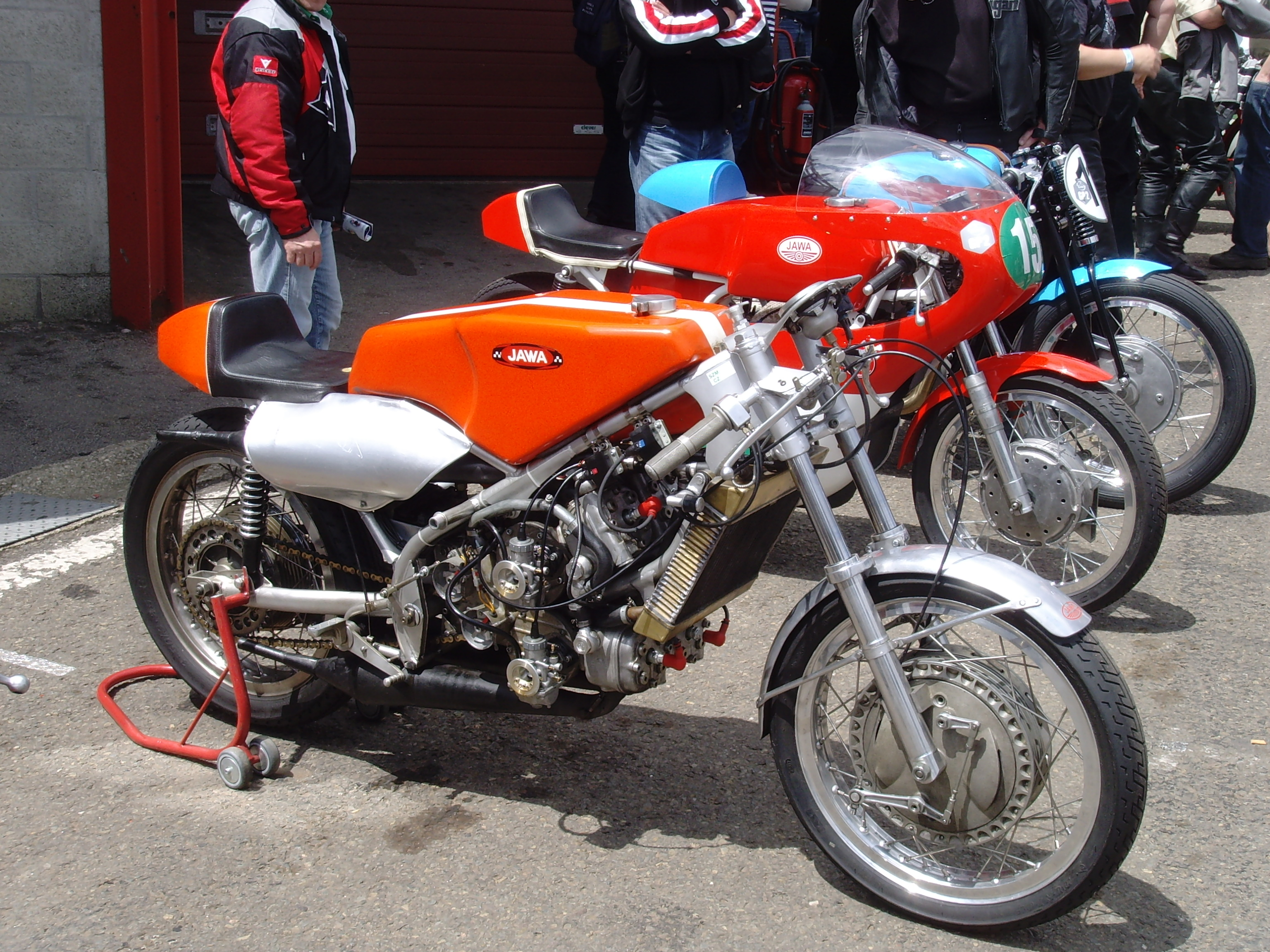
Racing bike Jawa 350/673 V4

Historically, JAWA had been active in racing, and by far the most active Eastern European manufacturer in motor sports. In track racing, JAWA sustained a presence in the world championship until the mid-'60s with respectable performances considering their limited budget. In motocross, the firm built an impressive record before its four-stroke engines became superseded by two-stroke engines. In speedway racing, dirt-track racing, and ice racing where four-stroke engines were still at an advantage, the firm remained a dominant force. The separate factory where these competition motorcycles were built became a separate company following the privatizations of the 1990s with the fall of communism.

Speedway World Champions who have ridden successfully on Jawa bikes include Ivan Mauger, Barry Briggs, Ove Fundin, Ole Olsen, Michael Lee, Tony Rickardsson, and Kelvin Tatum.

== Recent information ==
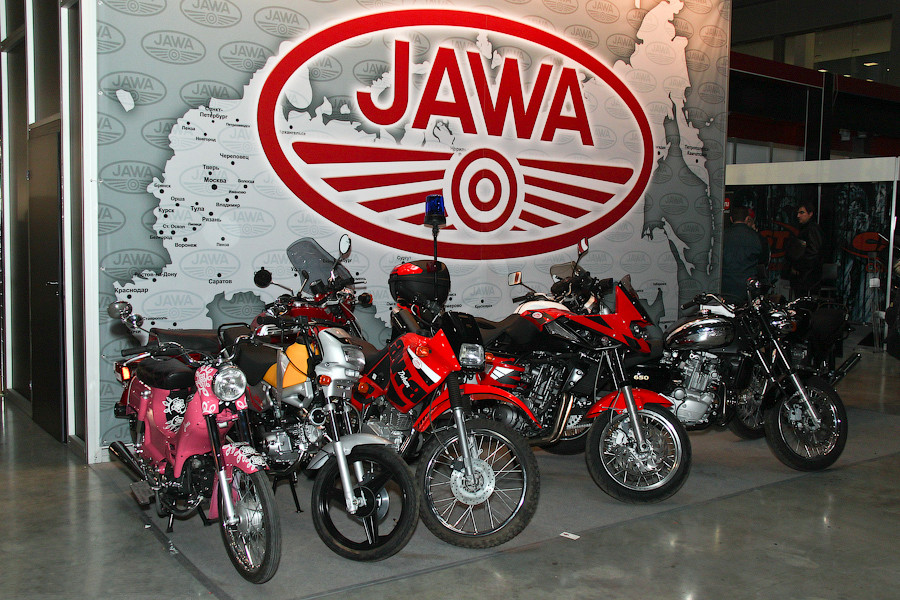
JAWA models in 2011

Following the dissolution of Czechoslovakia and the dismantling of the communist bloc, the Jawa consumer motorcycles and the Speedway competition bikes were divided into separate companies. In the 1990s, JAWA Speedway bikes were successful, while the Jawa company has struggled. As of 2006, the JAWA mostly produced bikes similar to Honda 250, 125, and 50 cc motorcycles and a large bike with a 650 cc Rotax engine (this engine can be also found in BMW F650 series). Production of motorcycles with smaller volumes has been gradually terminated.

Most sold is the Jawa 350 two-stroke twin, which is almost mechanically unchanged since the 1970s, but reliable. Currently they are sold only in Latin America.

The large bike with a 650 cc Rotax engine was produced since 2004 in three different variations. The JAWA 650 classic was a retro bike with classic proportions. The JAWA 650 Style was aimed for city streets, and the JAWA 650 Dakar was a full-scale enduro bike similar to the Honda XL Transalp. The Jawa 660 was the successor to the Jawa 650, and was sold between 2011 and 2018.

RVM Jawa 500 from 2020 is a motorcycle produced by the Argentine company RVM, the company is a long-term importer of Jawa, in which Jawa has a certain economic share. It is a touring enduro motorcycle with 471 cc (32.5/36 kW), and is sold both in Argentina and Europe. In July 2021, a model suitable for both road and light terrain RVM Jawa 500 Scrambler (471 cc, 31.5 kW) was added to the market.

Current models (2025) sold by the JAWA company are: Jawa 350 OHC, Jawa 400 Geeny and Jawa JD 750.
