= Jawa 660 =

Czech motorcycle

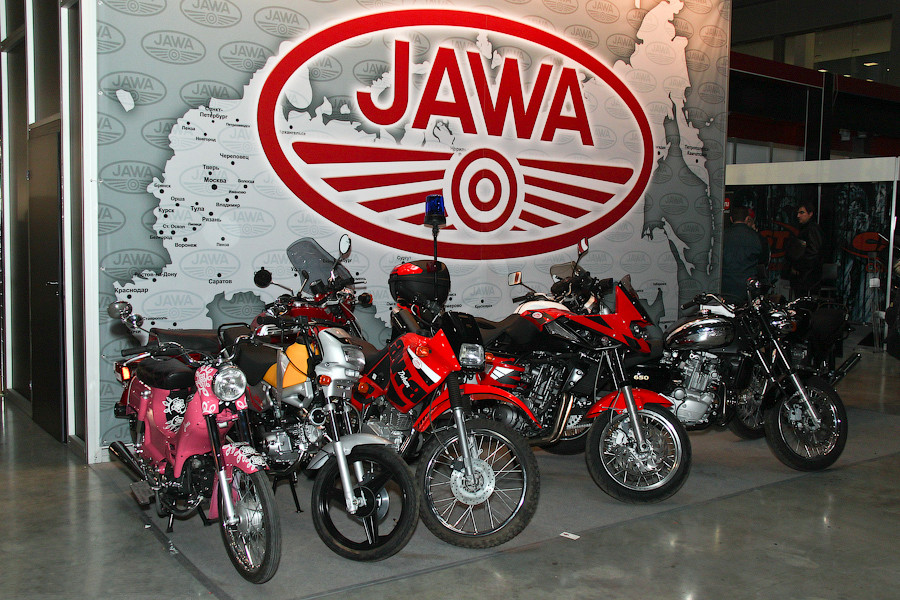
Jawa 660 Sportard (red on the right) in the model range of Jawa in 2011

The Jawa 660 was a motorcycle, produced by Jawa Moto in the Czech Republic in 2011–2018. The predecessor was the Jawa 650. The motorcycle is made in three versions: the Jawa 660 Sportard, Adenium and Vintage. The Adenium is slightly altered Sportard, main changes include in: 19" front wheel, crash bar, higher front plexiglass, main stand, rear diode light and side trunk carriers. The Vintage is a retro version, produced since 2017 in the design of Jawa 350/634. Since 2014, it was imported through the F2 Motorcycles dealer also to the UK.

== Specifications ==
- Motor: Minarelli SOHC, water-cooled four-stroke single-cylinder with EFI injection ( same as Yamaha XT660Z Teneré )
- Displacement: 660 cm3
- Power: 36 kW @ 6000 ot./min
- Max. torque: 58 Nm @ 5500 ot./min
- Emission standards: Euro 3
- Frame: tubular steel
- Wheelbase: 1497 mm
- Transmission: five-speed
- Wheels: front 17" 120(130)/70 or 19" 100/90, and rear 17" 150(180)/70(60)
- Brakes: rear disc 220 mm, front 2x discs 305 mm
- Dry weight: 189 kg
- Tank capacity: 15 L
- Max. speed: 170 km/h
- Fuel consumption: 4.5 L/100 km
- Acceleration 0–100 km/h: 5 s
