= Ledce (Hradec Králové District) =

- Municipality
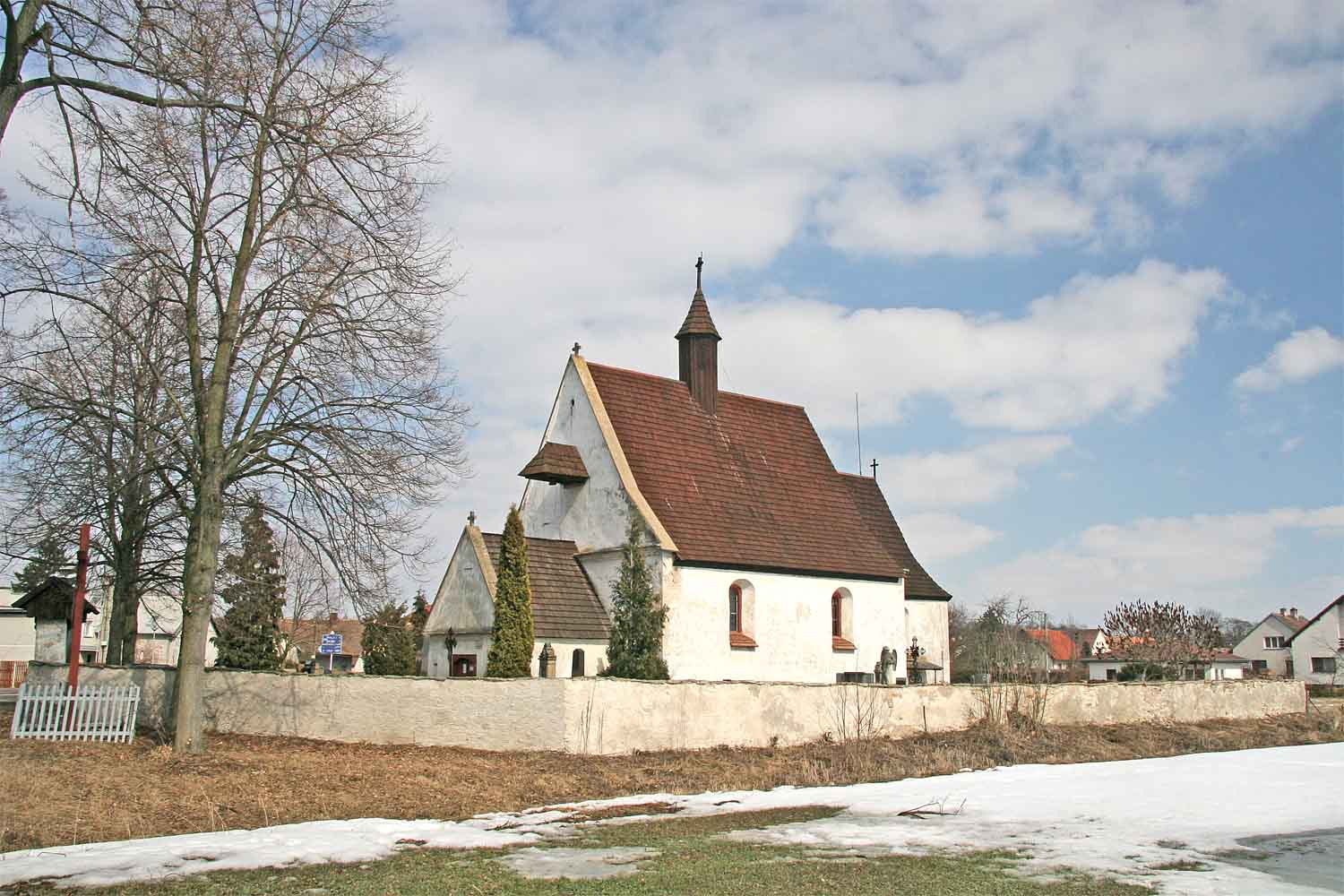
- Church of Saint Mary Magdalene

- Flag Coat of arms

- Location in the Czech Republic
- Coordinates: 50°13′26″N 16°2′34″E
- Country: Czech Republic
- Region: Hradec Králové
- District: Hradec Králové
- First mentioned: 1450

Area
  - Total: 10.25 km^{2} (3.96 sq mi)
- Elevation: 248 m (814 ft)

Population (2026-01-01)
  - Total: 340
  - Density: 33/km^{2} (86/sq mi)
- Time zone: UTC+1 (CET)
  - Summer (DST): UTC+2 (CEST)
- Postal code: 517 71
- Website: www.ledce.cz

Ledce is a municipality and village in Hradec Králové District in the Hradec Králové Region of the Czech Republic. It has about 300 inhabitants.

== Administrative division ==
Ledce consists of three municipal parts (in brackets population according to the 2021 census):

- Ledce (242)
- Klášter nad Dědinou (57)
- Újezdec (35)

== Demographics ==
Historical population
| Year | Pop. | ±% |
|---|---|---|
| 1869 | 559 | — |
| 1880 | 573 | +2.5% |
| 1890 | 586 | +2.3% |
| 1900 | 535 | −8.7% |
| 1910 | 493 | −7.9% |
| 1921 | 472 | −4.3% |
| 1930 | 443 | −6.1% |
| 1950 | 368 | −16.9% |
| 1961 | 417 | +13.3% |
| 1970 | 379 | −9.1% |
| 1980 | 325 | −14.2% |
| 1991 | 299 | −8.0% |
| 2001 | 305 | +2.0% |
| 2011 | 390 | +27.9% |
| 2021 | 334 | −14.4% |
Source: Censuses

== Notable people ==
- František Janeček (1878–1941), engineer and entrepreneur
