= Yamaha XT660R =

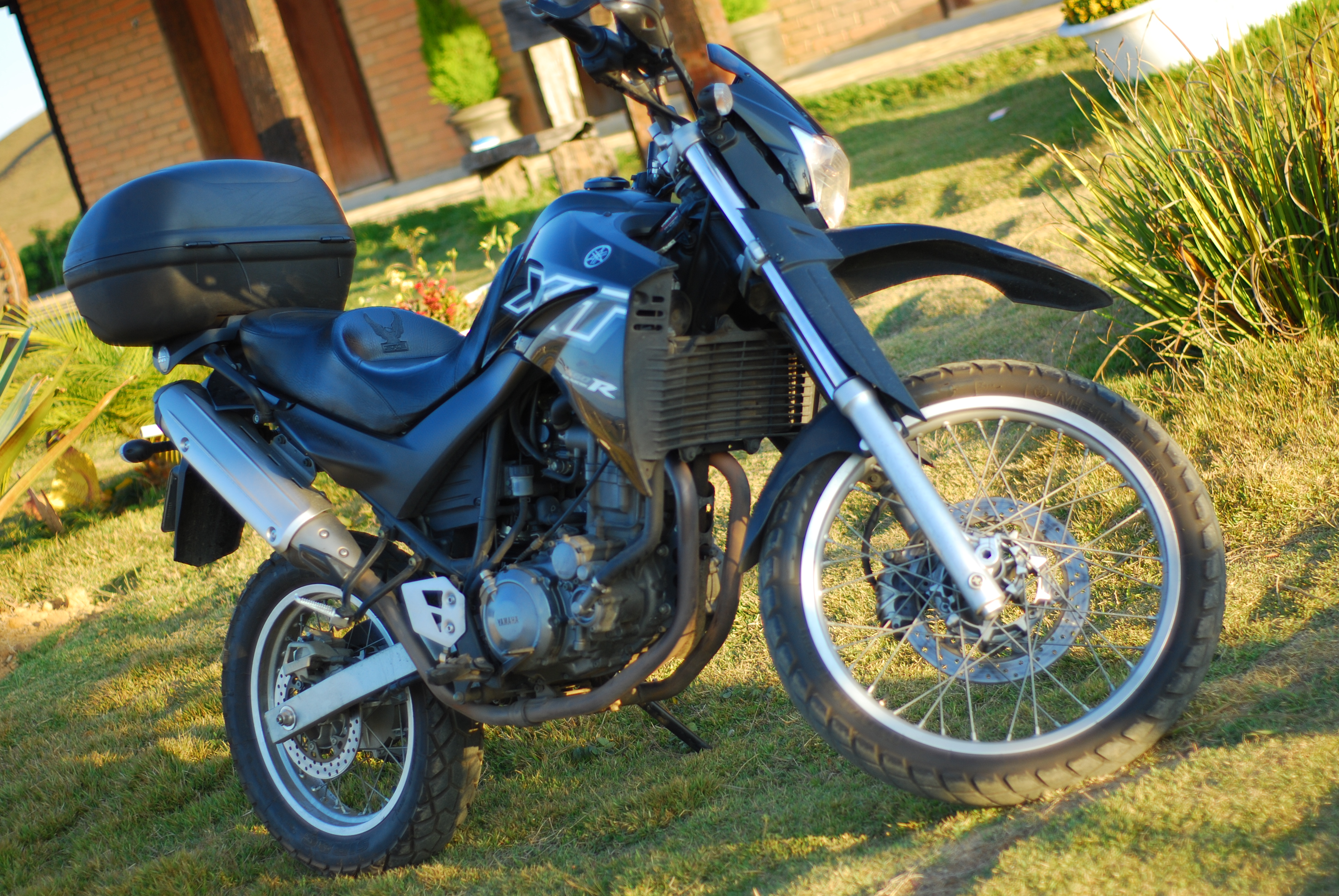
- Manufacturer: Yamaha Motor Company
- Predecessor: XT600
- Class: Dual-sport
- Engine: 660 cc liquid-cooled, 4-stroke, SOHC, single-cylinder, 4-valve, fuel injected
- Bore / stroke: 100.0 mm × 84.0 mm (3.94 in × 3.31 in)
- Compression ratio: 10.0:1
- Power: 35 kW (47 hp) @ 6,000 rpm
- Torque: 58 N⋅m (43 lbf⋅ft) @ 5,500 rpm
- Transmission: 5-speed chain drive
- Suspension: Front: Telescopic forks Rear: Monoshock
- Brakes: Front: Single disc Rear: Single disc
- Tires: Front: 90/90R21; Rear: 130/80R17; Spoked tubed wheels
- Rake, trail: 28° / 113 mm (4.4 in)
- Wheelbase: 1,500 mm (59 in)
- Dimensions: L: 2,260 mm (89 in); W: 895 mm (35.2 in); H: 1,500 mm (59 in)
- Seat height: 895 mm (35.2 in)
- Weight: 181 kg (399 lb) (wet)
- Fuel capacity: 15 L (3.3 imp gal; 4.0 US gal)
- Oil capacity: 2.9 L (3.1 US qt)
- Related: XT660Z Ténéré

The Yamaha XT660 is dual-purpose on/off-road motorcycles released by Yamaha Motors as a replacement for the XT600.

It is a development of the original XT series ('X' stands for 4 strokes, 'T' for TRAIL), a line of motorcycles inspired by those used on the Paris Dakar rally. The first XT was released in 1976. The XT660R is the standard Enduro model ('R' stands for racing).

A five-valve version of the 660 cc engine was used in a number of MZ (MuZ) motorcycles, including the MZ Skorpion, Baghira and Mastiff.

After 2015 this bike was not sold in some European countries and US.

== Related Models ==
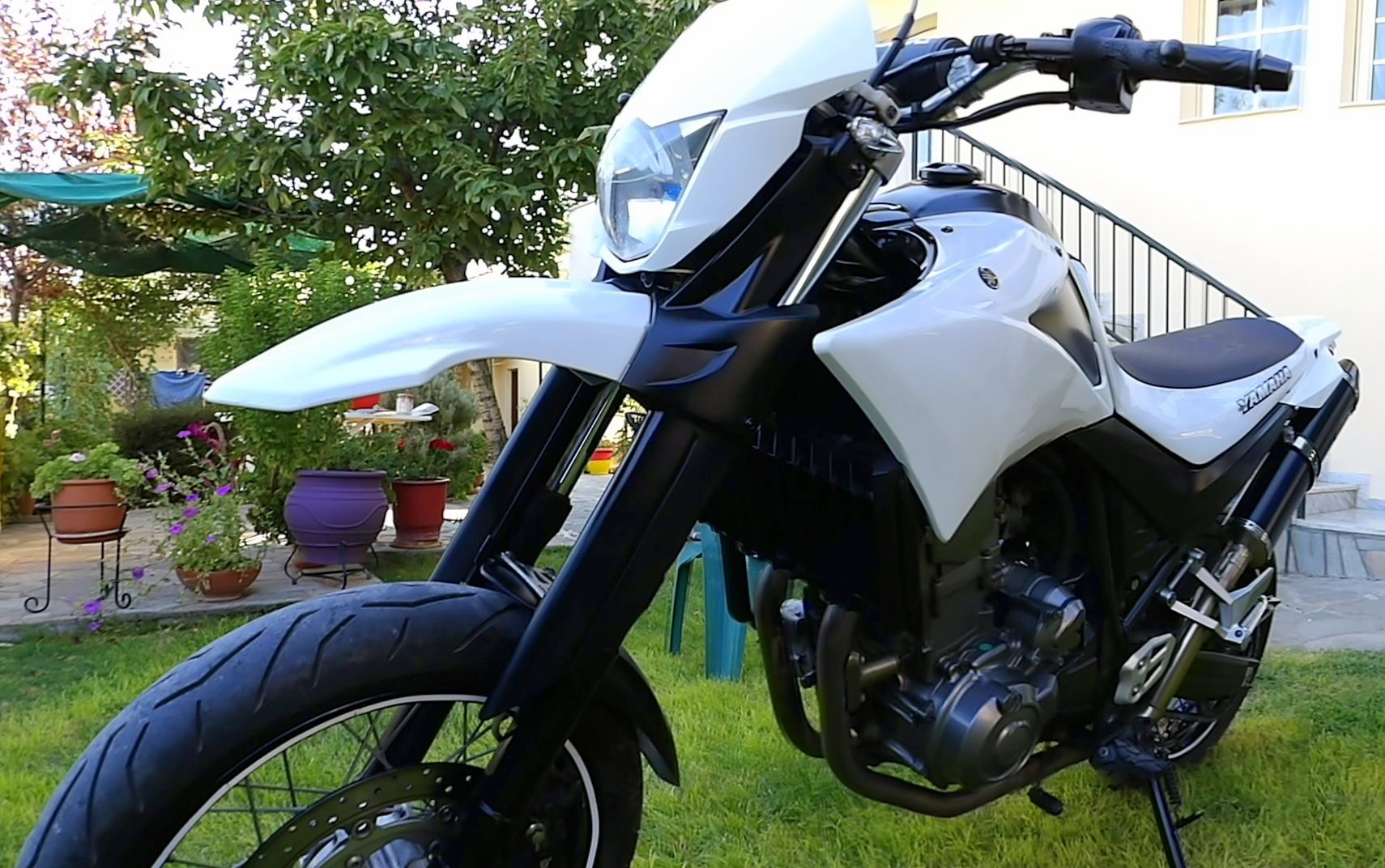
Yamaha XT660 X 2008 facelift

Two other versions of this motorcycle are being produced alongside the XT660R – the XT660X, a more street-oriented supermoto version, and the XT660Z Ténéré, an adventure touring version,. All versions utilize the same engine and share some chassis components.
