= František Janeček =

Czech engineer and entrepreneur

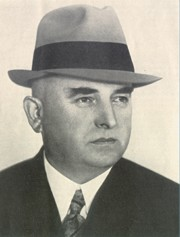
- František Janeček before 1925
- Born: 23 January 1878; Klášter nad Dědinou, Bohemia, Austria-Hungary
- Died: 4 June 1941 (aged 63); Prague, Protectorate of Bohemia and Moravia
- Occupations: Motorcycle designer and engineer

František Janeček (23 January 1878 – 4 June 1941) was a Czech engineer and entrepreneur. He was the founder of Jawa motorcycles and an important figure in the development of the Czechoslovak motorcycle industry.

== Early life ==
Janeček was born on 23 January 1878 in Klášter nad Dědinou, Bohemia, Austria-Hungary (today part of Ledce, Czech Republic). He went to Prague to study mechanics at the Prague Technical School and then moved to Germany to the Berlin College of Engineering.

Upon graduation he returned to Prague and began working for the Jewish industrialist Emil Kolben at the Kolben company. He did well and when he was only 23 he was appointed manager of the new factory opened by Kolben in the Netherlands, where he met his future wife. He was hit by a car when riding his bicycle to work. The daughter of the driver gave him first aid, and they became friends and later married.

At the age of 31 years, motivated by his success at designing inventions, Janeček decided to quit Kolben and start his own engineering workshop in Prague.

== The pneumograf ==
During the ten years after he moved to Prague, Janeček's mechanical research workshop performed hundreds of experiments and registered dozens of patents. The most successful ones were related to sound recordings. He also spent some time travelling around Europe (Germany, Belgium, the Netherlands and England, among other places), looking for many technological innovations and new ways to organize work.

Still, his greatest commercial prospects were placed on an invention known as the pneumograf (pneumograph). It consisted in a pneumatic system with a series of air tubes which activated a mesh of tiles, that each one had a black face and a white face. When air flowed through an individual tube, the tile attached to it would flip, revealing its white face and allowing to show an image on the background of black tiles. This way, the pneumograph could display several advertisements and daily reports. A prototype was presented on the top of a building in the Národní avenue in Prague, located at the Jungmannovo náměstí 761/1 address, drawing the public's attention.

Janeček's plans included the installation of other pneumographs in Berlin, Warsaw and St. Petersburg. However, the arrival of World War I put negotiations to a halt, and his project was never developed.

== World War I ==
After serving on the Italian front in World War I Janeček experienced a prolific period of designing and inventing and secured over sixty new patents, including a design for an improved hand grenade The grenade, named Model 21, became the standard hand grenade of the Czechoslovak army, and was nicknamed the "Janeček".

== Motorcycle development ==
Janeček saw an opportunity in 1927 to turn a former armament factory into a motorcycle manufacturing company. He drew on his knowledge of engineering and his experience with factory mass production techniques and based his new motorcycle designs around an existing 498cc engine made by a German company called Wanderer. The new company was named JAWA in 1929, a compound of the first two letters of Janeček and Wanderer.

Janeček first began producing Wanderer motorcycles under license in 1927 in order to diversify the interests of his arms factory. His first motorcycle had a number of advanced features, including shift-drive and a steel frame. He was able to recruit an experienced British motorcycle designer George William Patchett, and together they developed a range of competition motorcycles to promote the new Jawa brand. In the 1930s Janeček expanded the range to include lightweight economy models based around British Villiers two-stroke engines, as well as middleweight 350cc side valve and overhead valve motorcycles under the Jawa brand (e.g. Jawa 350).

== World War II ==
When Czechoslovakia was occupied by Nazi Germany in 1938 Janeček was forced to turn his factory over to the occupying command and it was used to produce German aircraft engines and generators. He continued to work in secret on the development of single-cylinder two-stroke motorcycles and the production was restarted following the end of the war.

František Janeček died on 4 June 1941 and the Jawa company was then taken over by his son Karel Janeček.

== Littlejohn adaptor ==
The Littlejohn adaptor was a device that could be fitted on to the British QF 2 pounder (40 mm) anti-tank gun. It was used to extend the service life of the 2-pounder during World War II by converting it to squeeze bore operation. "Littlejohn" came from the literal anglicization of František Janeček's name.
