= 700 MHz =

700 MHz may refer to:

Telecommunications (spectrum management)

- APT band plan in the 700 MHz band, a type of segmentation of the 700 MHz band created by the Asia-Pacific Telecommunity
- US band plan in the 700 MHz band, a type of segmentation of the 700 MHz band created by the Federal Communications Commission
