= Yamaha XT1200Z Super Ténéré =

Yamaha XT1200Z (Super Ténéré)
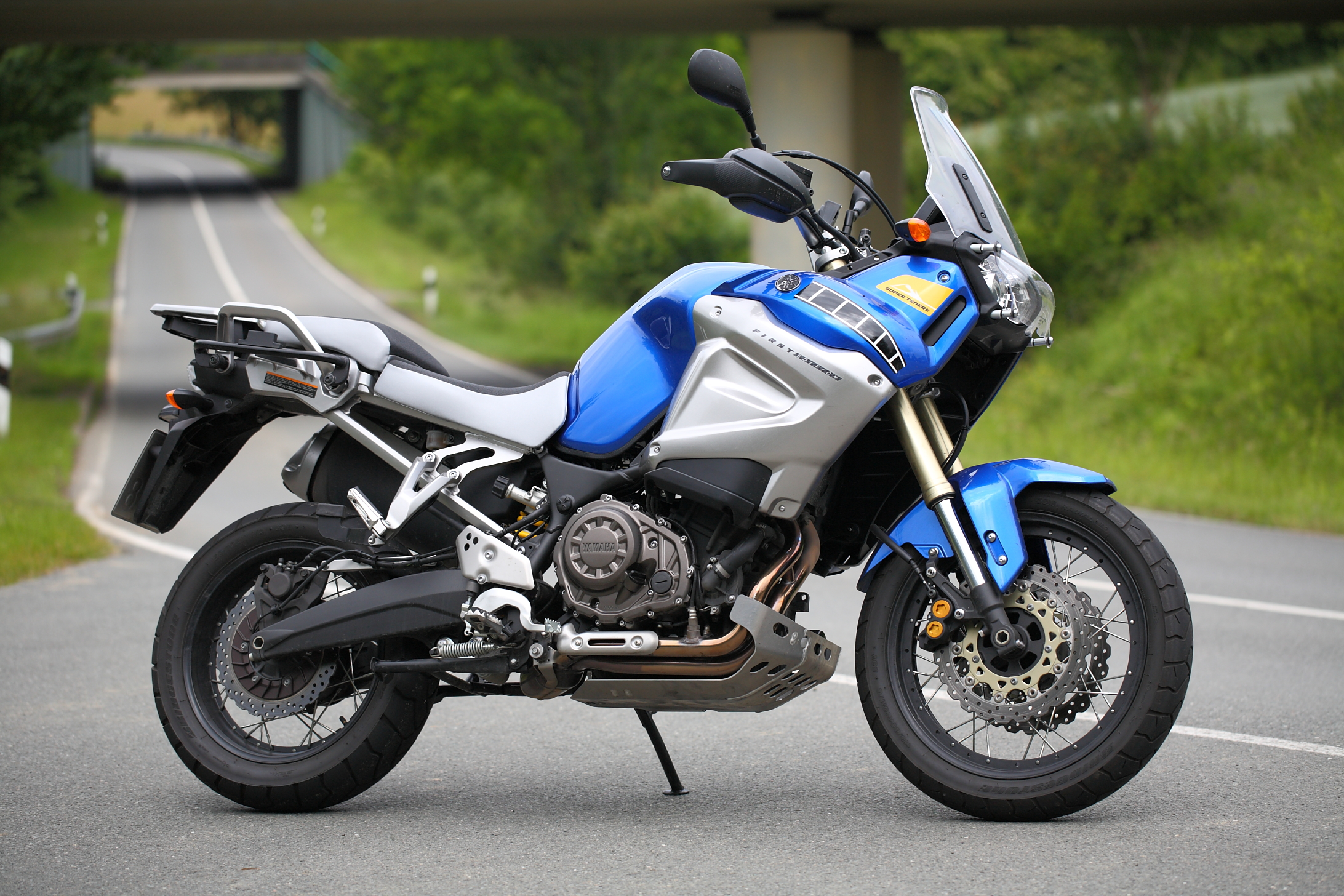
- Manufacturer: Yamaha Motor Company
- Production: 2010–2024
- Class: Adventure touring
- Engine: 1,199 cc liquid-cooled, 4-stroke, DOHC, Forward-inclined parallel 2-cylinder, 4-valve, fuel injected, twin spark, 270-degree crankshaft
- Bore / stroke: 98.0 mm × 79.5 mm (3.86 in × 3.13 in)
- Compression ratio: 11.0:1
- Power: 80.9 kW (108.5 hp) @ 7,250 rpm
- Torque: 114.1 N⋅m (84.2 lbf⋅ft) @ 6,000 rpm
- Transmission: 6-speed shaft drive
- Suspension: Front: Telescopic forks Rear: Monoshock
- Brakes: Front: 320 mm twin discs Rear: 282 mm single disc Combined and ABS
- Tyres: Front: 110/80R19; Rear: 150/70R17; Spoked tubeless wheels
- Rake, trail: 28° / 125 mm (4.9 in)
- Wheelbase: 1,540 mm (61 in)
- Dimensions: L: 2,250 mm (89 in); W: 980 mm (39 in); H: 1,410 mm (56 in)
- Seat height: 845–870 mm (33.3–34.3 in)
- Weight: 261 kg (575 lb) (wet)
- Fuel capacity: 23 L (5.1 imp gal; 6.1 US gal)
- Oil capacity: 3.40 L (3.59 US qt)
- Related: XT660Z Ténéré

The Yamaha XT1200Z Super Ténéré is a motorcycle produced by Yamaha Motor Corporation, that was launched in 2010. The XT1200Z is the largest in a series of dual-sport Yamaha motorcycles named after the Ténéré, a desert region in the south central Sahara. It features a liquid-cooled four-stroke, fuel-injected 1,199 cc (73.2 cu in) parallel-twin engine with a 270° crank, which powers the motorcycle through a six-speed gearbox and shaft drive. The XT1200Z also features multi-mode traction control system and electronic throttle control (YCC-T) with programs to support off-road use, switchable engine mapping, and combined brakes with ABS.

The launch models were badged First Edition and came with bash plates and aluminum panniers. Yamaha stopped manufacturing the XT1200 in 2024 as it continued as the Super Tenere ES until model year 2024 per Yamaha’s website.

== See also ==
- BMW R1200GS
- Moto Guzzi Stelvio
- KTM 1290 Super Adventure
- Honda Africa Twin
