= Týnec nad Sázavou =

- Town
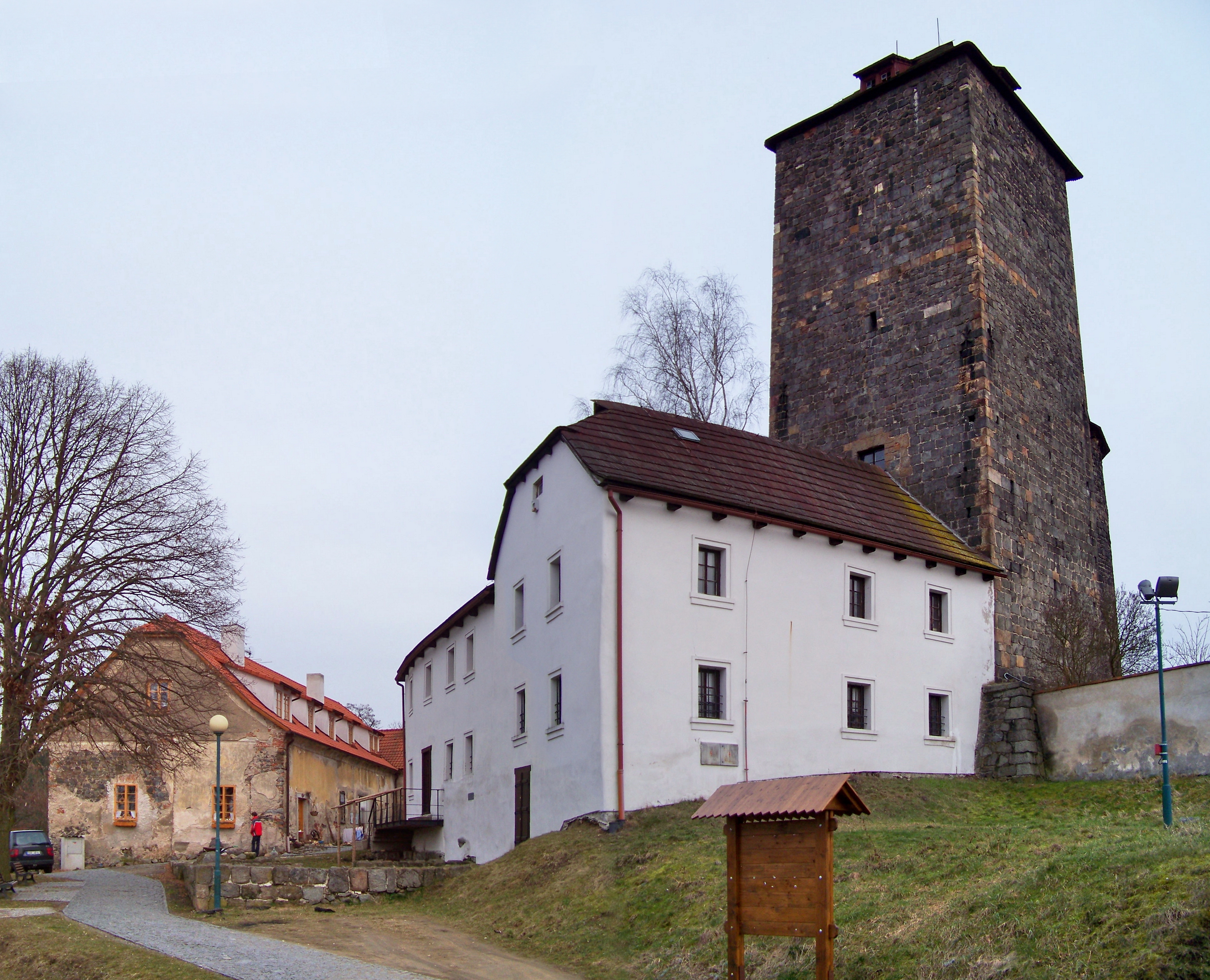
- Týnec nad Sázavou Castle

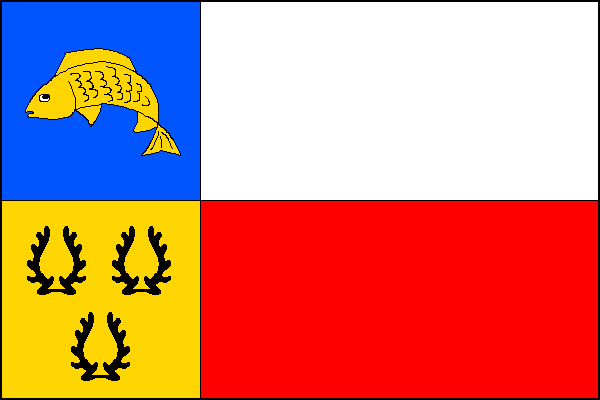
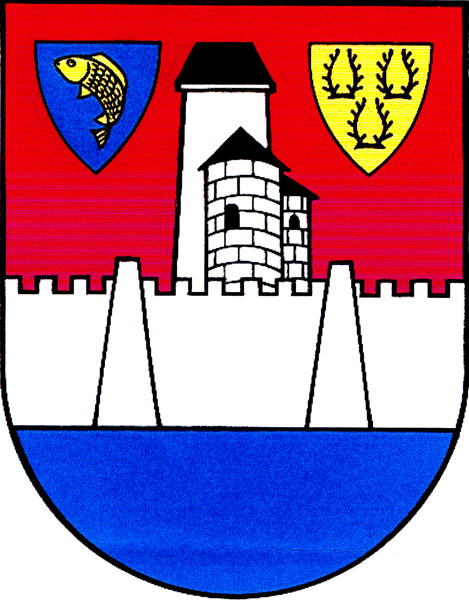
- Flag Coat of arms

- Location in the Czech Republic
- Coordinates: 49°50′3″N 14°35′23″E
- Country: Czech Republic
- Region: Central Bohemian
- District: Benešov
- First mentioned: 1318

Government
  - Mayor: Martin Kadrnožka

Area
  - Total: 25.75 km^{2} (9.94 sq mi)
- Elevation: 281 m (922 ft)

Population (2026-01-01)
  - Total: 5,732
  - Density: 222.6/km^{2} (576.5/sq mi)
- Time zone: UTC+1 (CET)
  - Summer (DST): UTC+2 (CEST)
- Postal codes: 251 68, 257 41, 257 42
- Website: www.mestotynec.cz

Týnec nad Sázavou (Czech pronunciation: [ˈtiːnɛts ˈnat saːzavou]) is a town in Benešov District in the Central Bohemian Region of the Czech Republic. It has about 5,700 inhabitants. The town is located on the Sázava River in the Benešov Uplands. The main landmark of the town is the Týnec nad Sázavou Castle.

== Administrative division ==
Týnec nad Sázavou consists of eight municipal parts (in brackets population according to the 2021 census):

- Týnec nad Sázavou (2,920)
- Brodce (335)
- Čakovice (269)
- Chrást nad Sázavou (985)
- Krusičany (200)
- Pecerady (506)
- Podělusy (217)
- Zbořený Kostelec (305)

== Etymology ==
The name Týnec is a diminutive of the Old Czech word týn (related to English 'town'), meaning 'fortified settlement'.

== Geography ==
Týnec nad Sázavou is located about 9 kilometres (6 mi) northeast of Benešov and 30 km (19 mi) south of Prague. It lies in the Benešov Uplands. The highest point is the hill Čížov at 433 m (1,421 ft) above sea level. The Sázava River flows through the town. There is a set of fishponds in the southern part of the municipal territory, supplied by the stream Janovický potok (a tributary of the Sázava).

== History ==
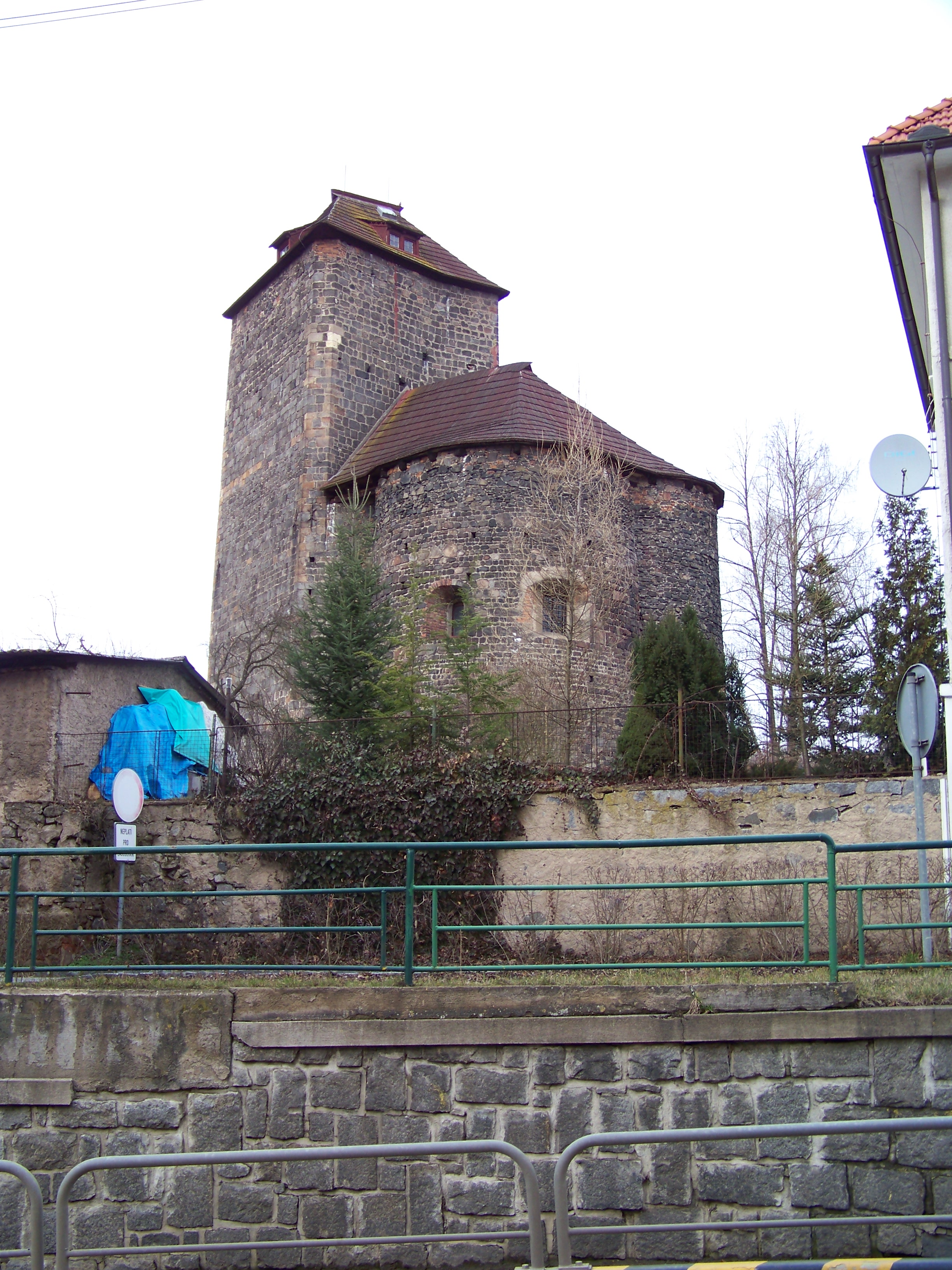
Romanesque rotunda

The first written mention of Týnec nad Sázavou is from 1318, when Oldřich of Týnec was documented as the owner of the local castle. The oldest part of the castle is a Romanesque rotunda, which indicates that the castle was built around 1200. In 1622, after the Battle of White Mountain, the town was acquired by Albrecht von Wallenstein. During his rule, the castle was burned down and the town was devastated. The castle was partially repaired, but in 1654, it burned down for the second time and became a ruin.

In 1785, the Konopiště estate with Týnec was acquired by Count František Josef of Vrtba, who restored importance to the neglected town. He founded a factory for earthenware here in 1791, and had the Týnec Castle with its Romanesque rotunda repaired. After his death, the Konopiště estate was inherited by the Lobkowicz family.

== Demographics ==
Historical population

Year	Pop.	±%
1869	1,840	—
1880	1,879	+2.1%
1890	1,998	+6.3%
1900	2,345	+17.4%
1910	2,730	+16.4%

Year	Pop.	±%
1921	2,426	−11.1%
1930	2,710	+11.7%
1950	3,424	+26.3%
1961	4,746	+38.6%
1970	4,990	+5.1%

Year	Pop.	±%
1980	5,655	+13.3%
1991	5,387	−4.7%
2001	5,340	−0.9%
2011	5,530	+3.6%
2021	5,737	+3.7%

Source: Censuses

== Economy ==
A traditional Czech manufacturer of motorcycles and mopeds, Jawa Moto, is based in the town.

== Transport ==
Týnec nad Sázavou is located on the railway line Prague–Čerčany.

== Sights ==
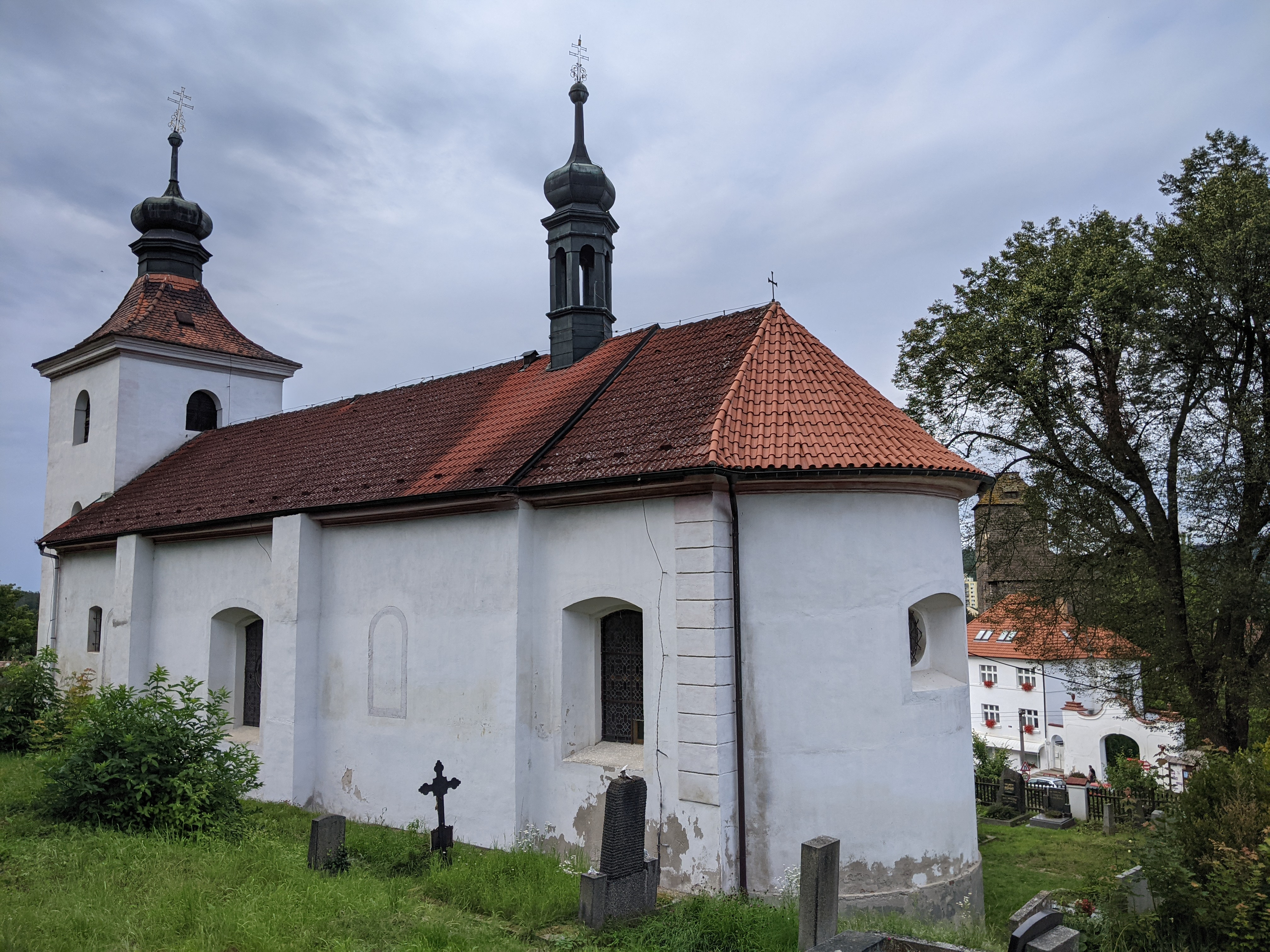
Church od Saints Simon and Jude

The most valuable building and main landmark of the town is the Týnec nad Sázavou Castle with its Romanesque rotunda. Today the castle houses the Town Museum. Its Gothic tower serves as a lookout tower. The attic of the rotunda houses a colony of the greater mouse-eared bat, which is a critically endangered species within the country, and therefore the rotunda is also protected as a nature monument.

The late Baroque building of the former earthenware factory is a notable building in the centre of the town, protected as a cultural monument. It was built in 1793 and at the turn of the 19th and 20th centuries, it was converted into a hotel. Today it also houses a cultural centre and the tourist information centre.

The Church od Saints Simon and Jude is originally a Gothic building, rebuilt in the Baroque style.

The Church od Saints Catherine is located in Chrást nad Sázavou. It was built in the first half of the 14th century and rebuilt into its current neo-Gothic form in 1888–1889.

Near Zbořený Kostelec is a ruin of the eponymous medieval castle. Originally called just Kostelec, the castle was first mentioned in 1342 and dates from the 13th or 14th century. In 1467, it was conquered by the army of King George of Poděbrady and was then deliberately demolished, hence its name Zbořený Kostelec (literally 'demolished Kostelec').

== Notable people ==
- Havel Medek of Valdek (died 1410), nobleman; possibly born here

== Gallery ==
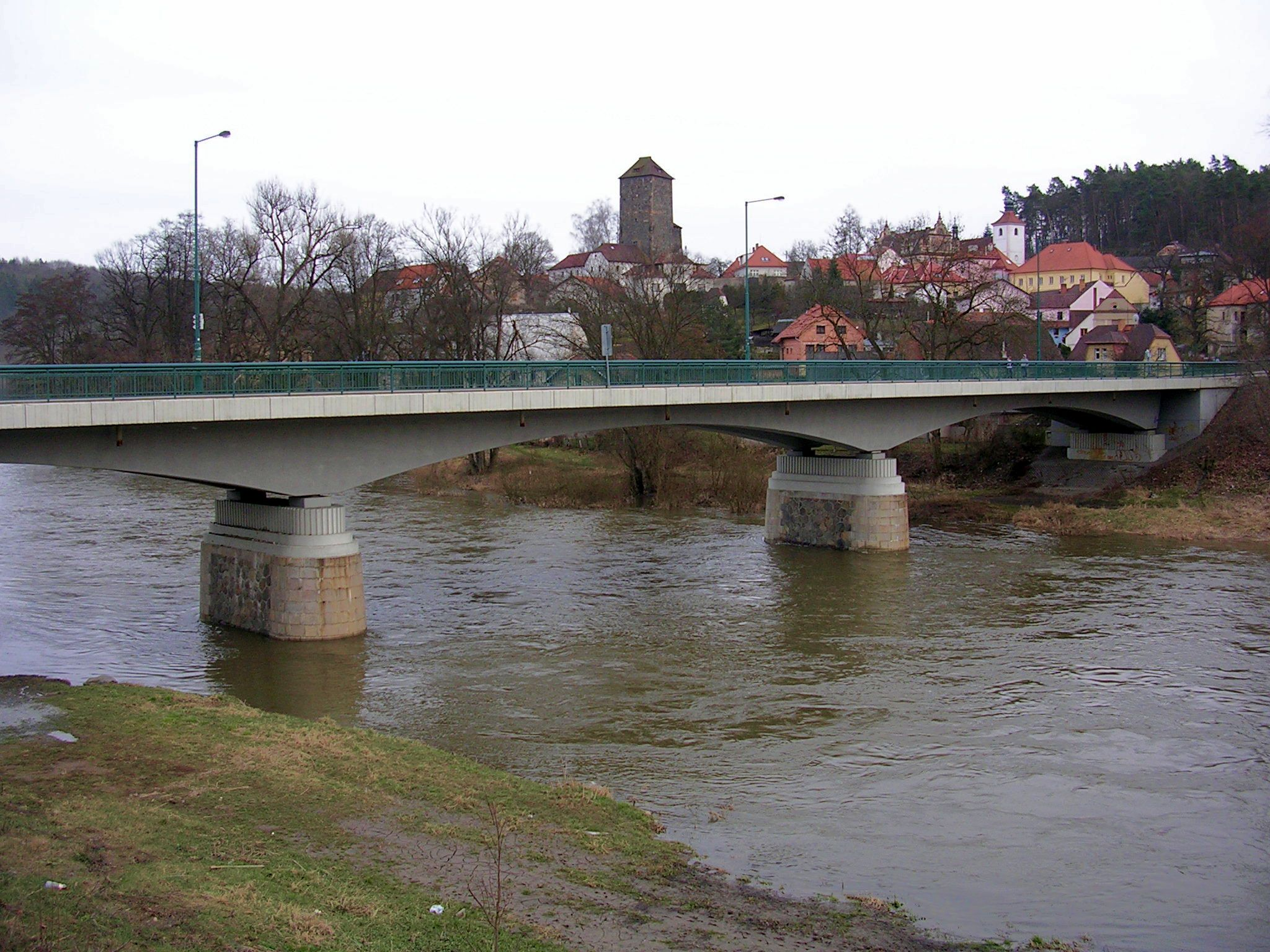
View from the northwest

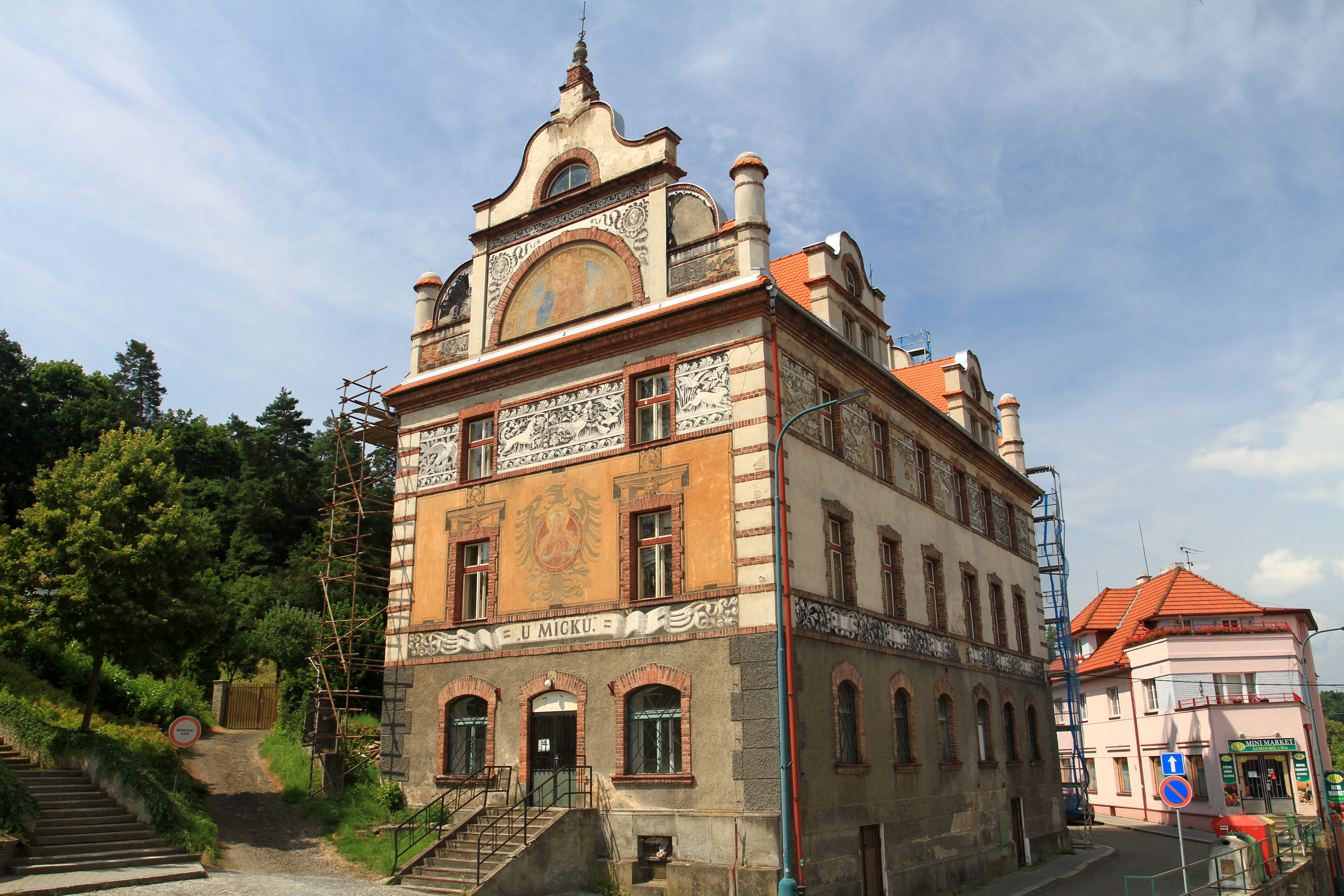
"U Micků" House

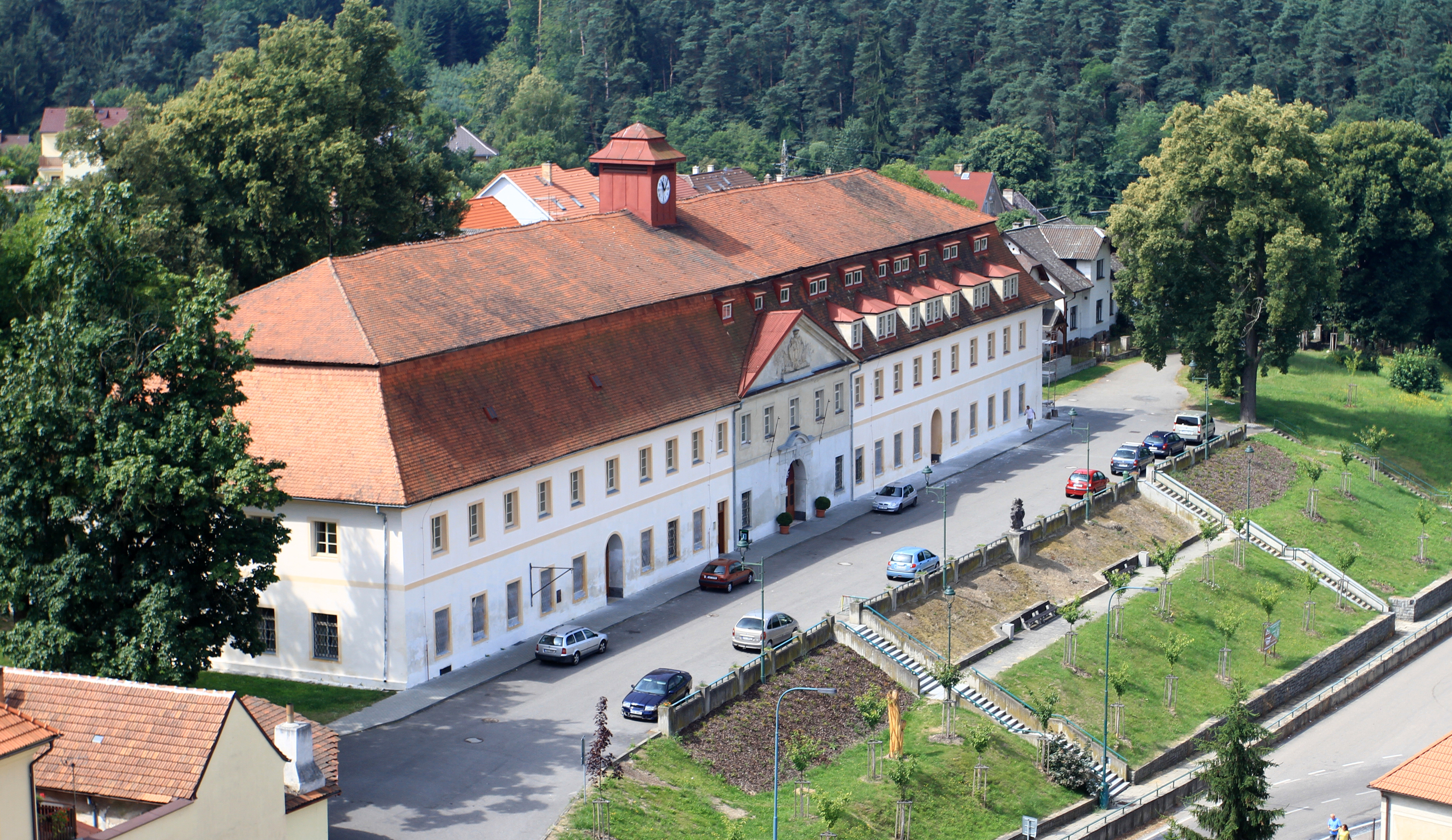
Former earthenware factory

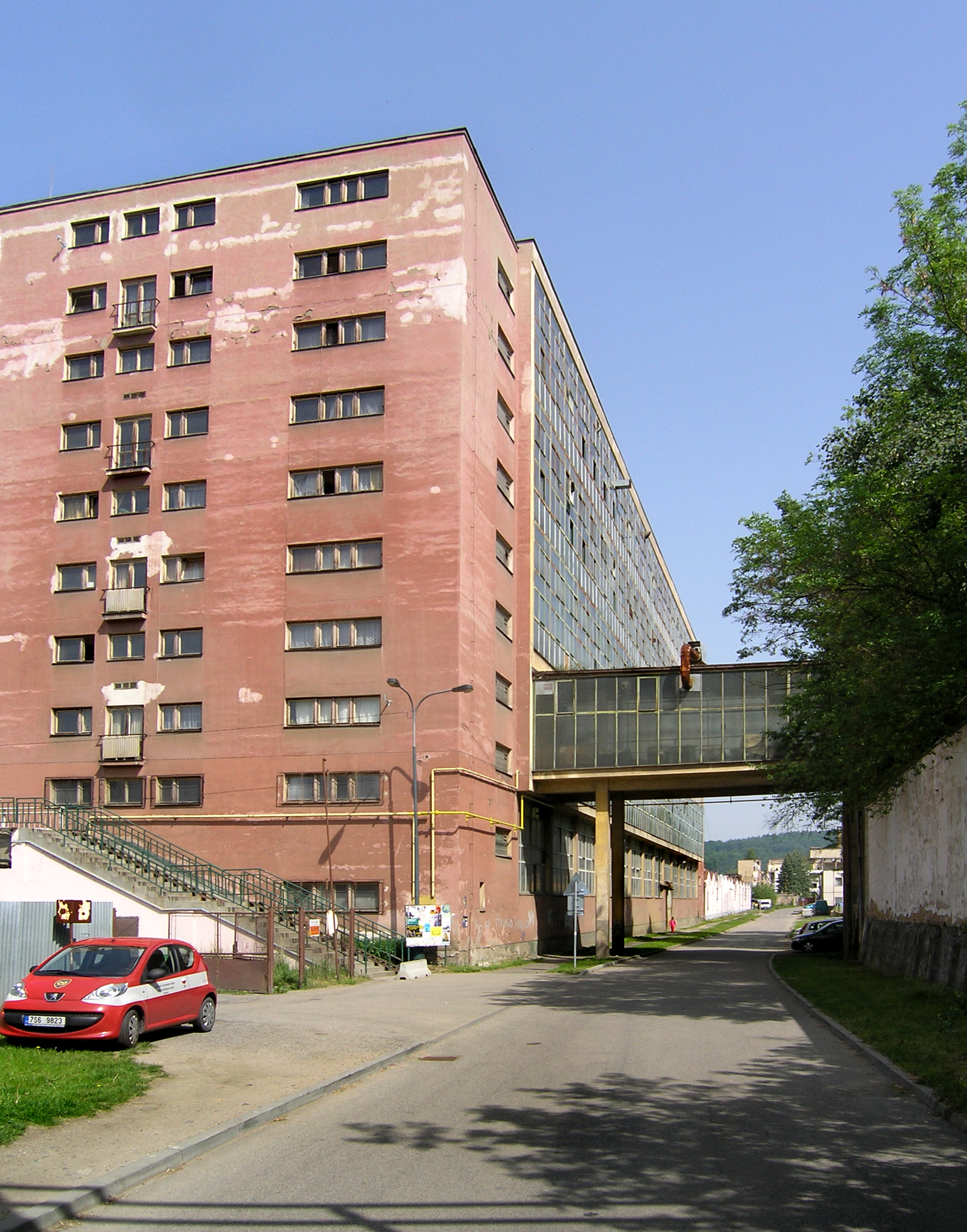
Jawa factory
