= 250 (disambiguation) =

250 may refer to:

- 250 (year)
- 250 (number)
- 250 (musician), a South Korean electronic musician
- Area code 250
- Ferrari 250, a series of sports cars
- FTSE 250 Index, a stock market index that measures the real strength of United Kingdom's national economy
- Mercedes-Benz 250, a series of automobiles manufactured by Mercedes-Benz
- Jawa 250, a motorcycle
- America 250, United States celebrations of the 250th anniversary of the Declaration of Independence
- Freedom 250, White House Task Force celebrating the 250th anniversary of the American Declaration of Independence
