= Jawa 250 =

Motorcycle model by Jawa Moto

The Jawa 250 was a motorcycle, produced by Jawa Moto in Czechoslovakia since 1934 until 1972 and in the Czechia since 1994 until 2013. As of 2019, the 250/597 Travel was equipped with the last engine of the company's own design, it was almost mechanically unchanged since the 1970s but very reliable.

== Versions ==
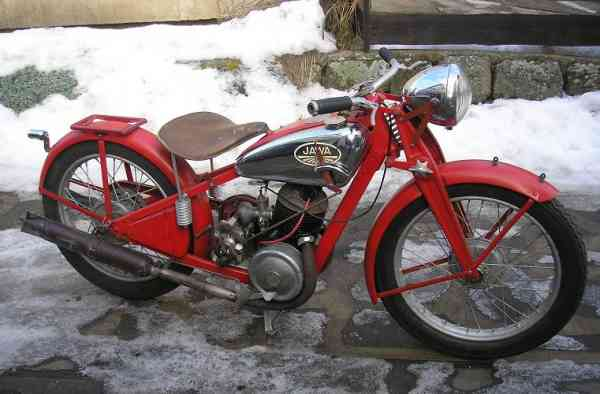
Jawa 250 Special

- 1934–1940: Jawa 250 Special
- 1939–1945: Jawa 250 Duplex-Blok
- 1946–1954: Jawa 250 Pérák
- 1954–1962: Jawa 250/353 Kývačka
- 1962–1974: Jawa 250/559 Panelka
- 1963–1974: Jawa 250/559 Automatic
- 1963–1971: Jawa 250/590 Californian
- 1969–1974: Jawa 250/592 Panelka
- 1963–1971: Jawa 250/623 Bizon
- 1970–1972: Jawa 250/623 UŘ
- 1994–2000: Jawa 250/593 Vodník
- 2007–2013: Jawa 250/597 Travel

== Images ==
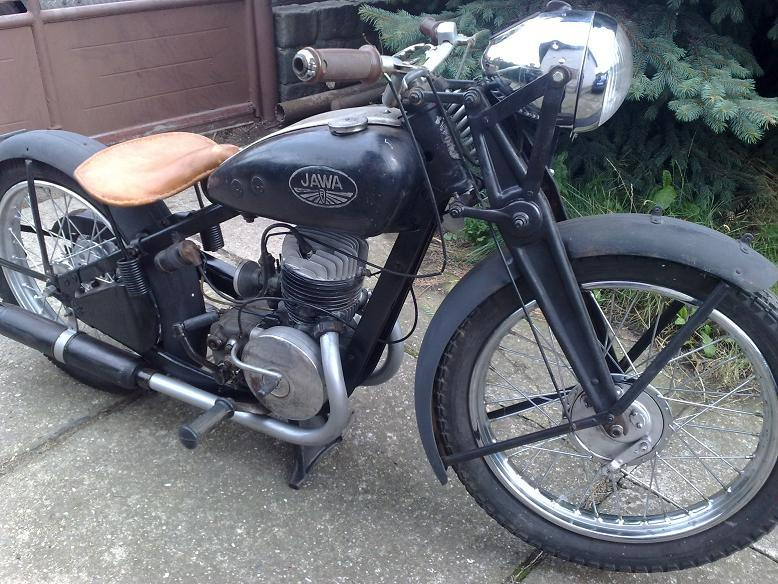
Jawa 250 Duplex-Blok

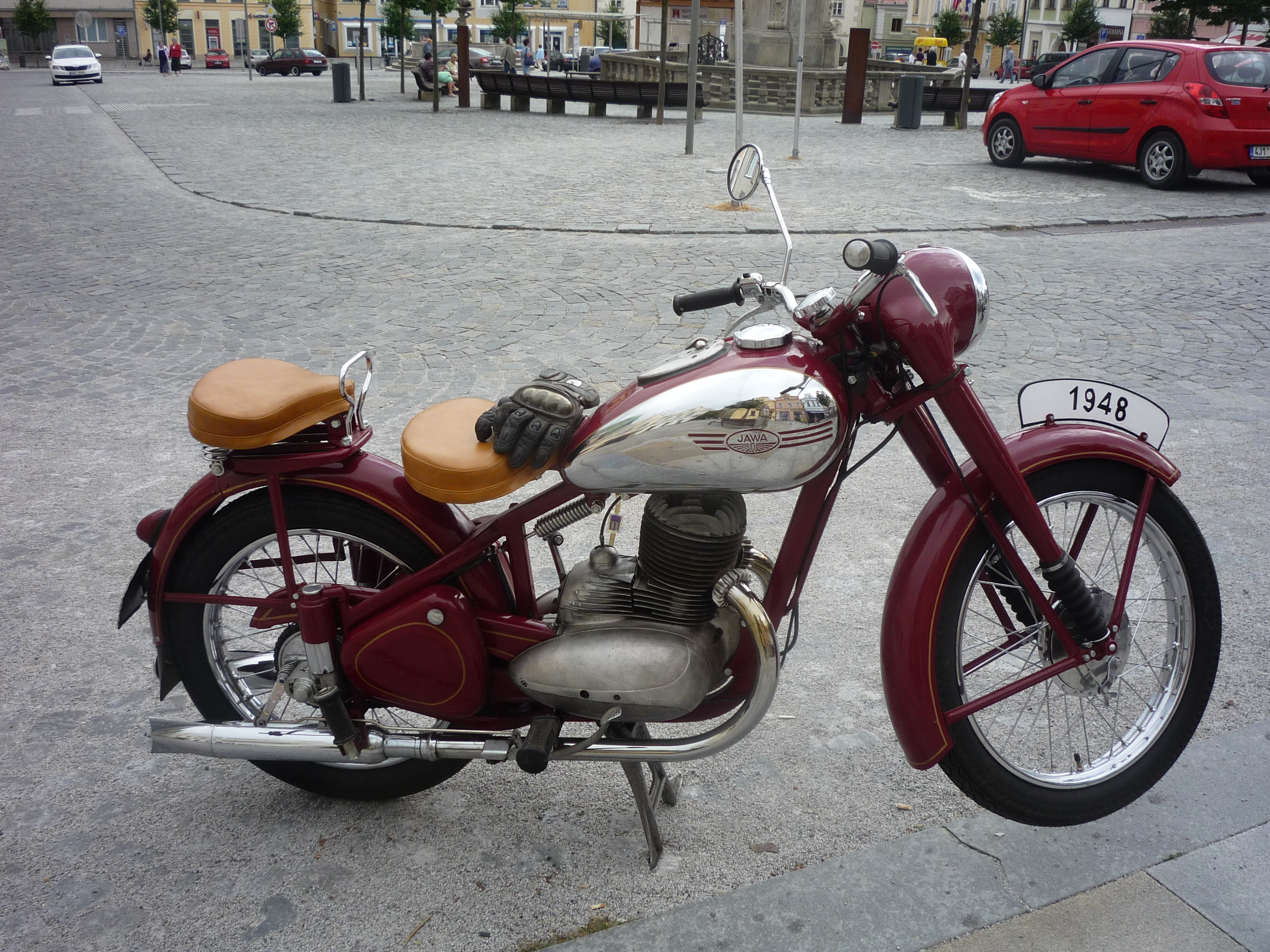
Jawa 250 Pérák

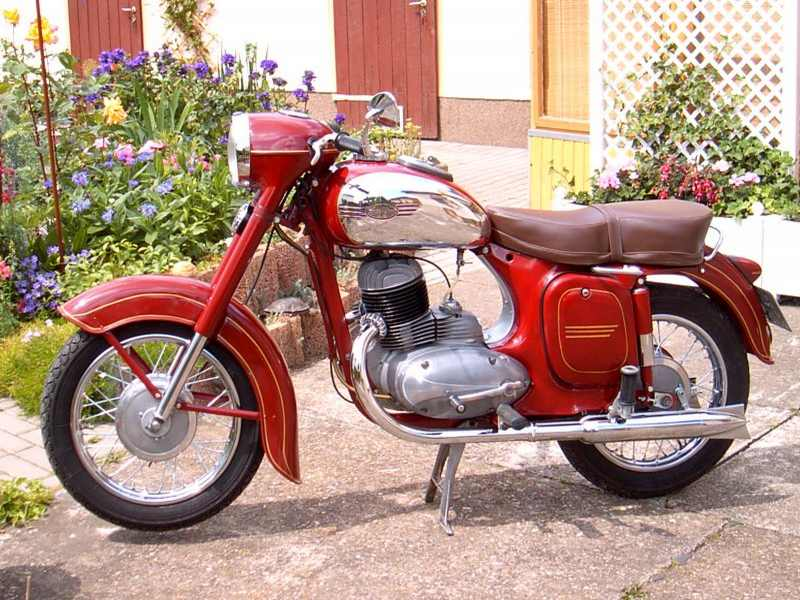
Jawa 250/353 Kývačka

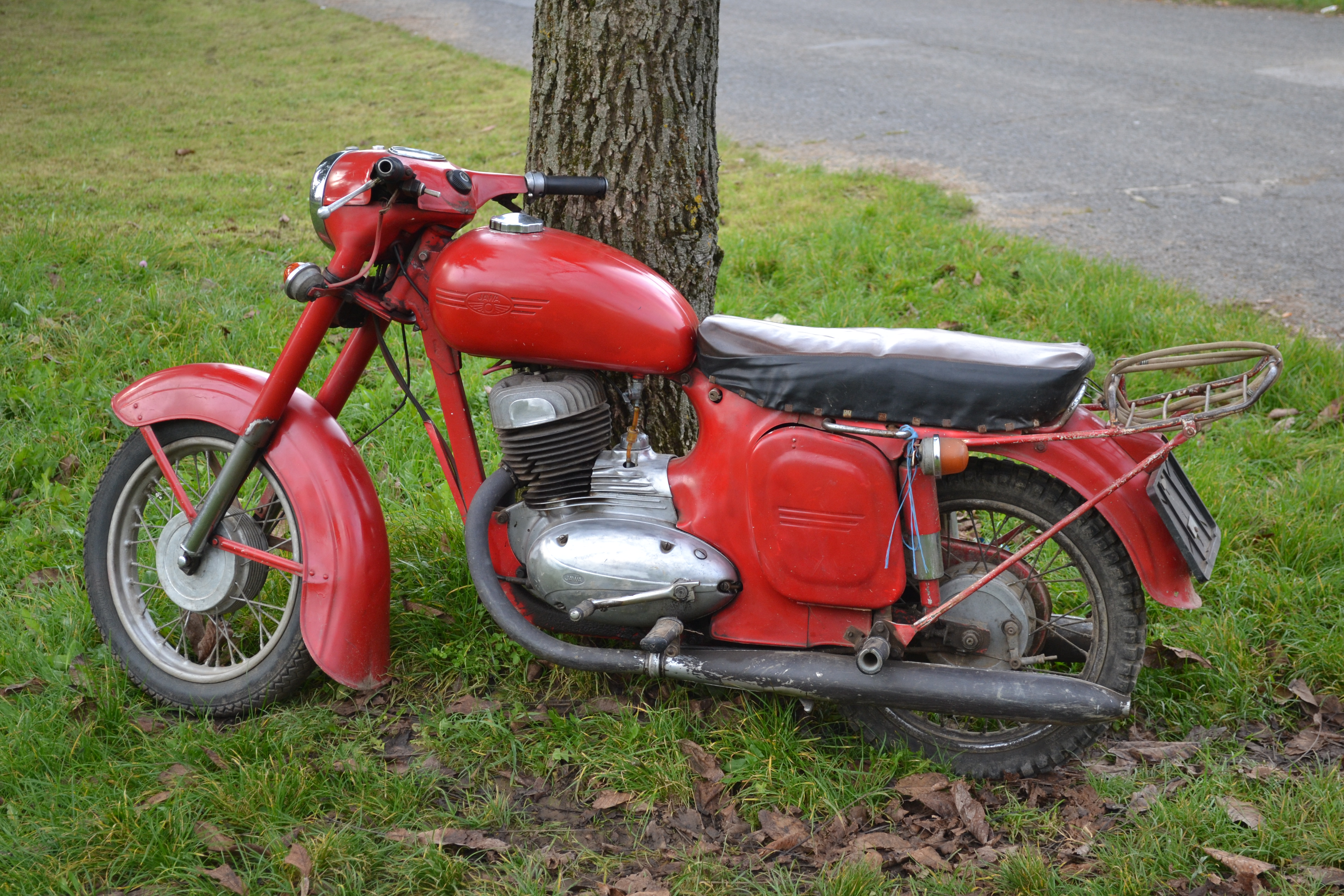
Jawa 250/559 Panelka

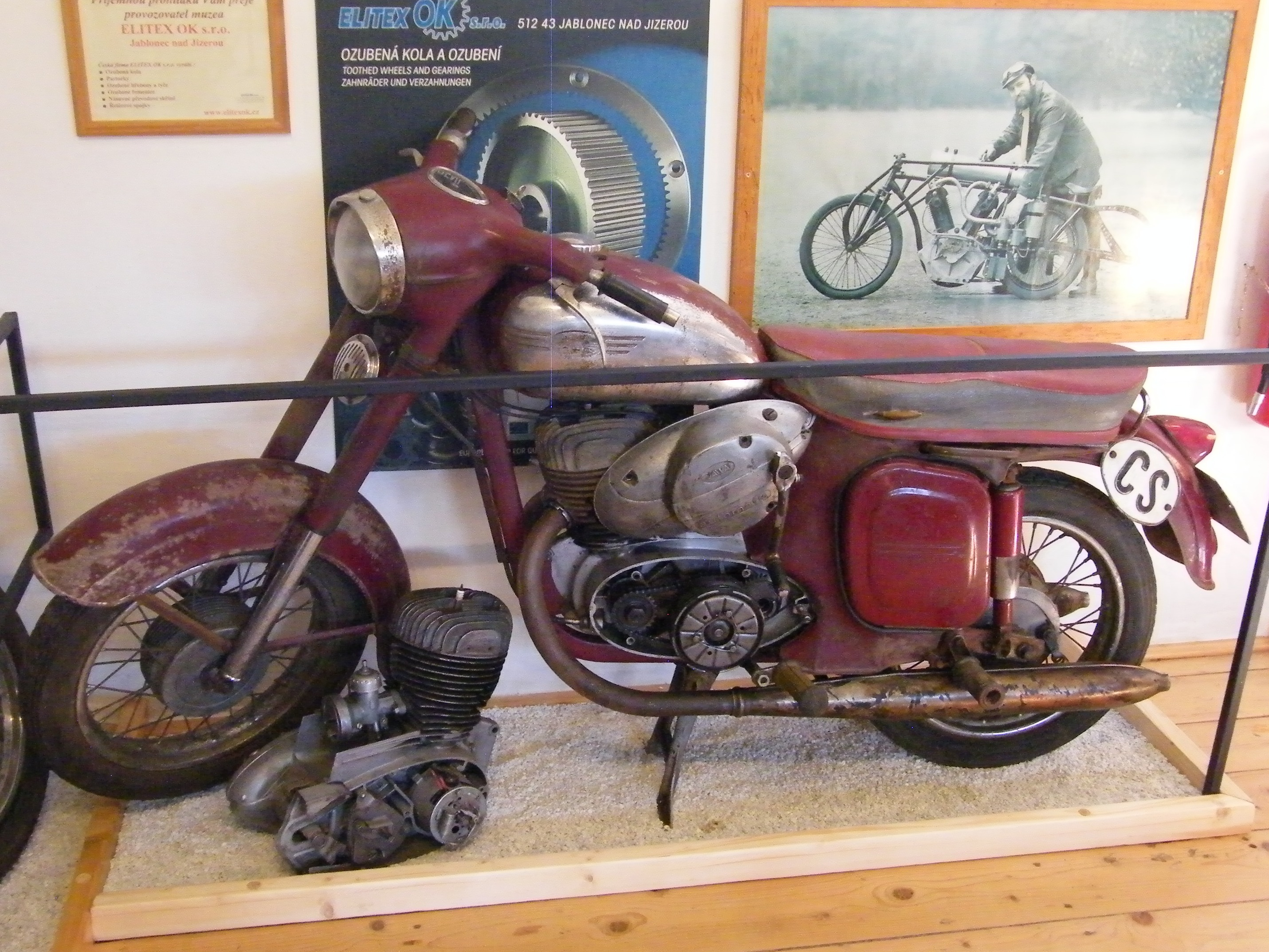
Jawa 250/559 Automatic

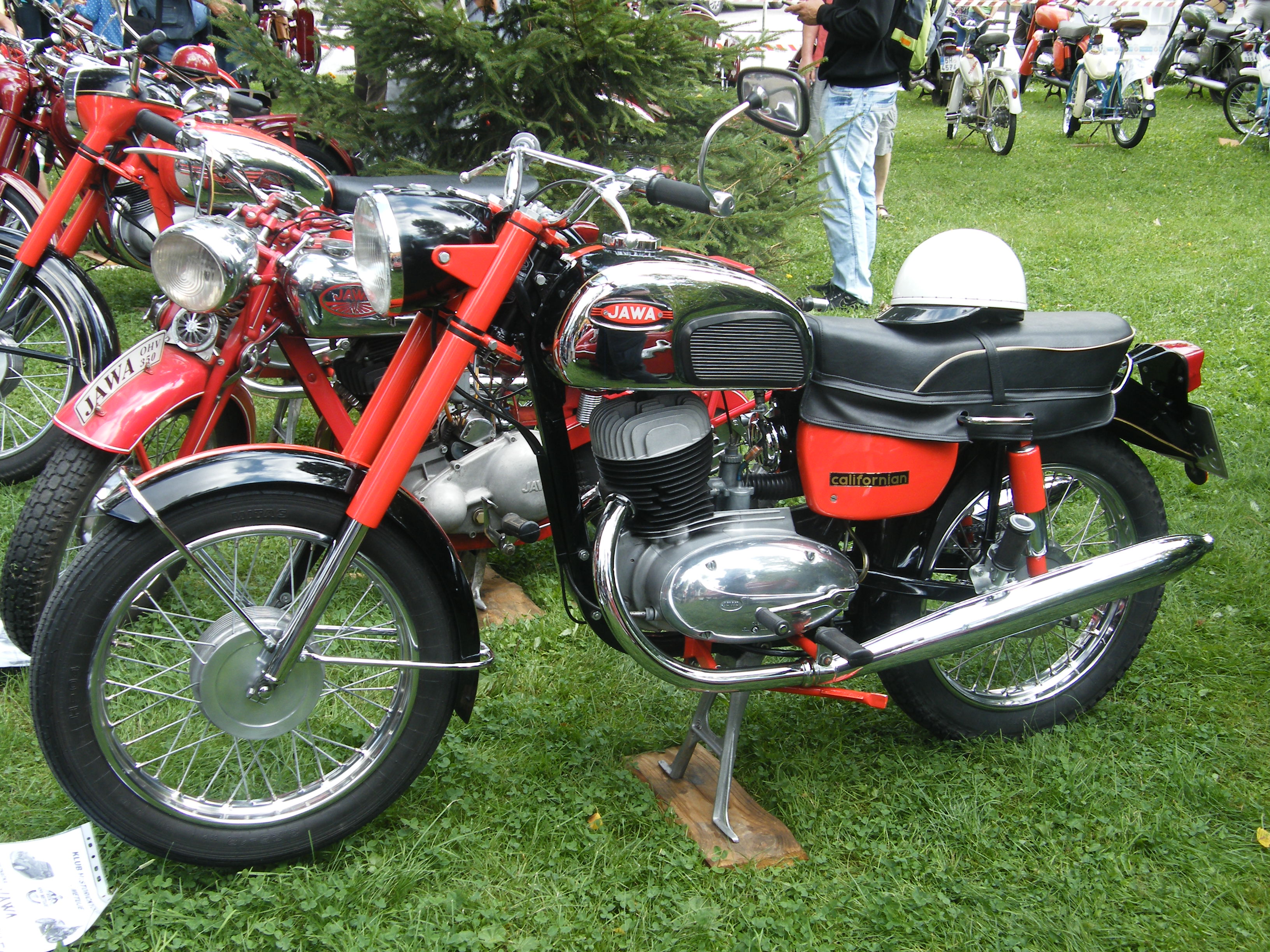
Jawa 250/590 Californian

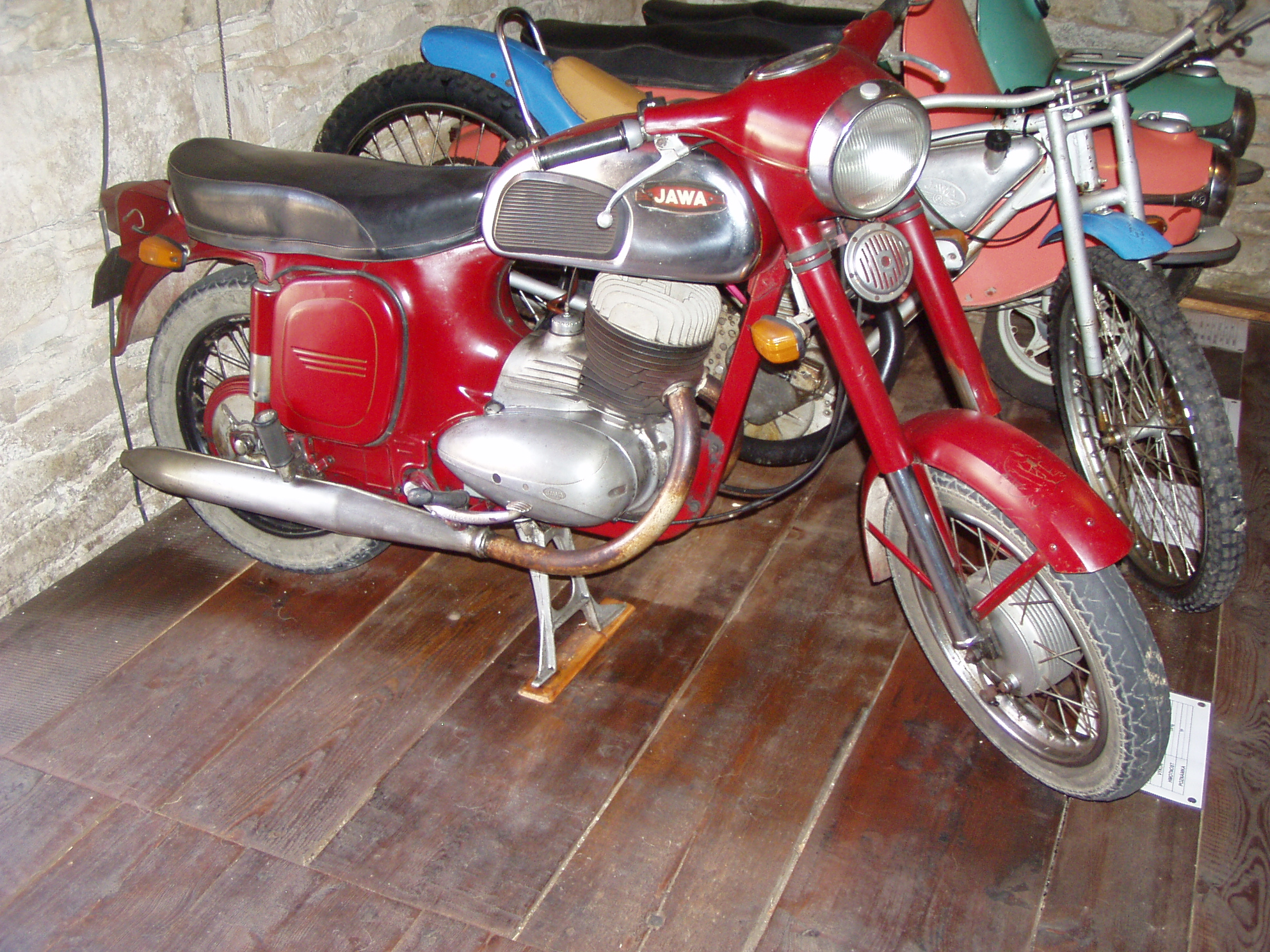
Jawa 250/592 Panelka

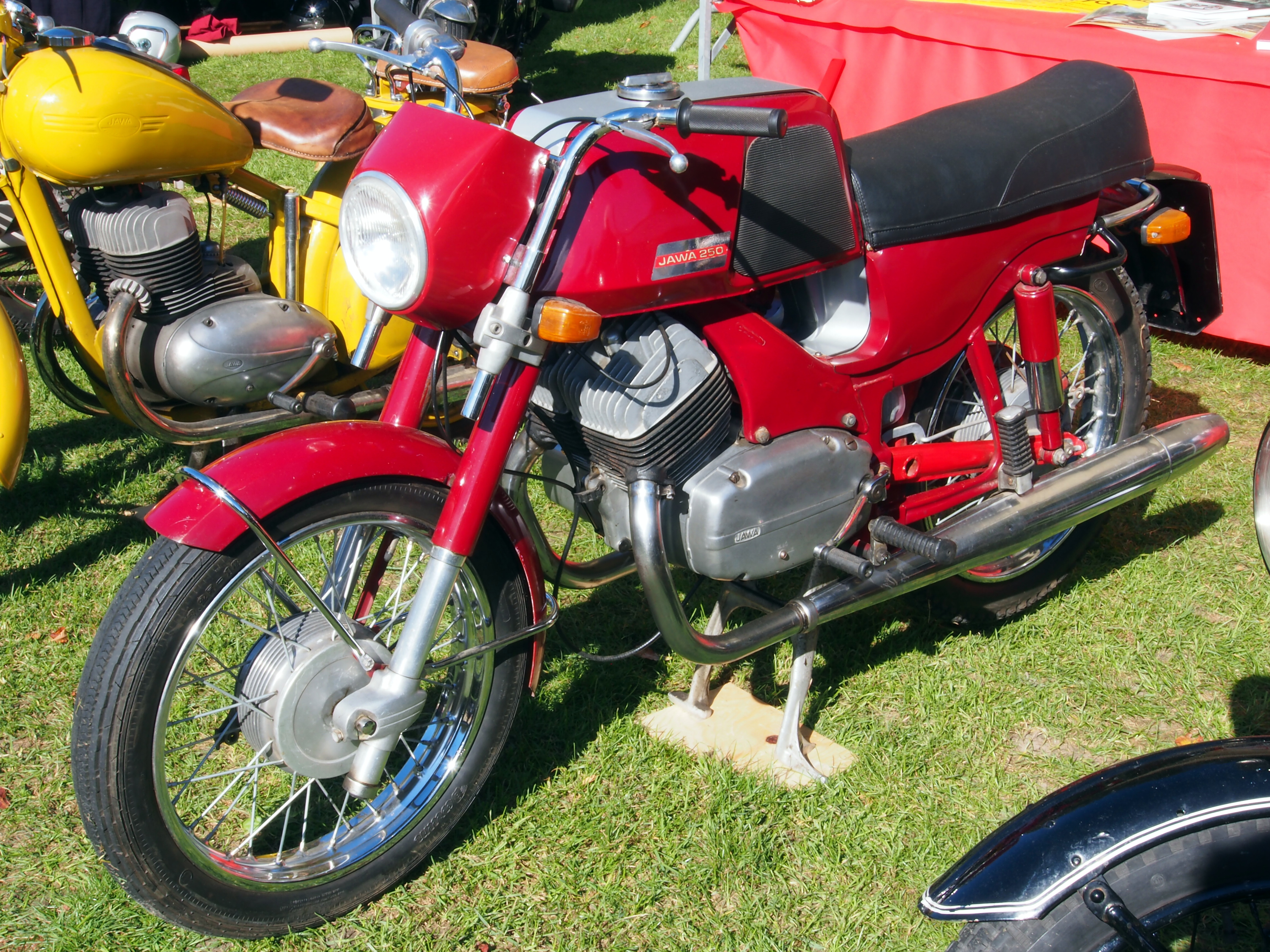
Jawa 250/623 Bizon

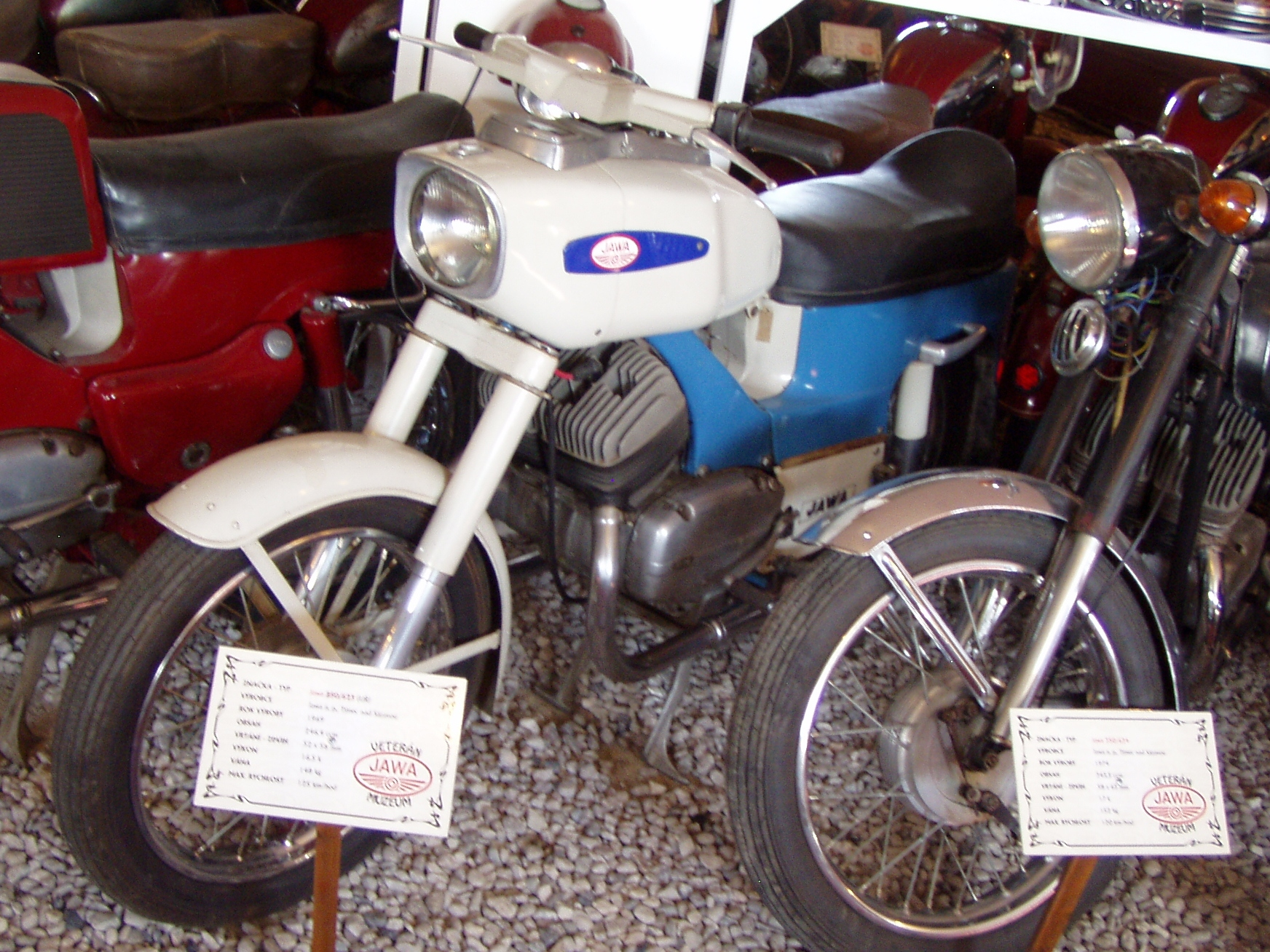
Jawa 250/623 UŘ

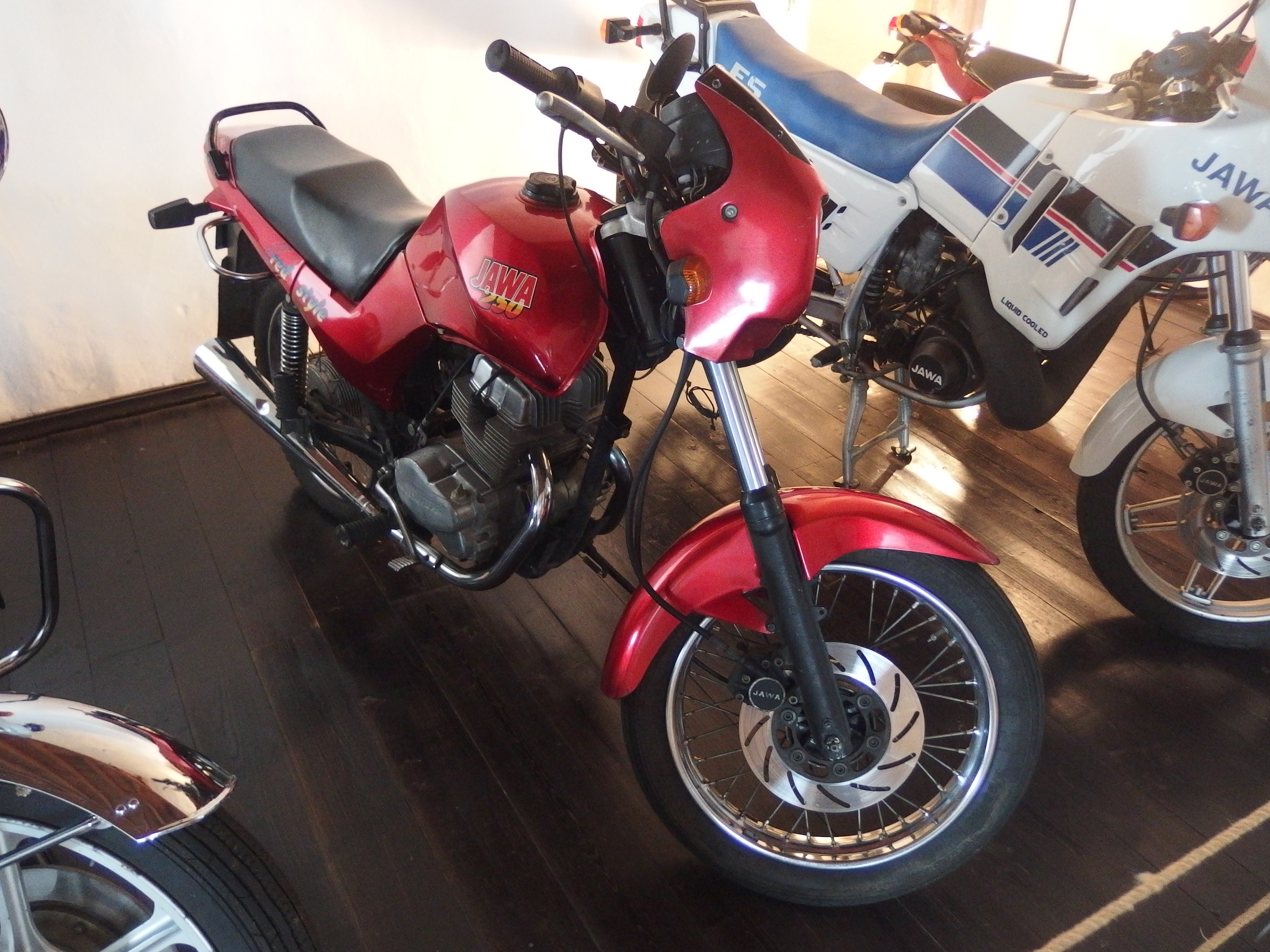
Jawa 250/597 Travel

== See also ==
- Jawa 350
