= Jawa 350 =

Motorcycle model

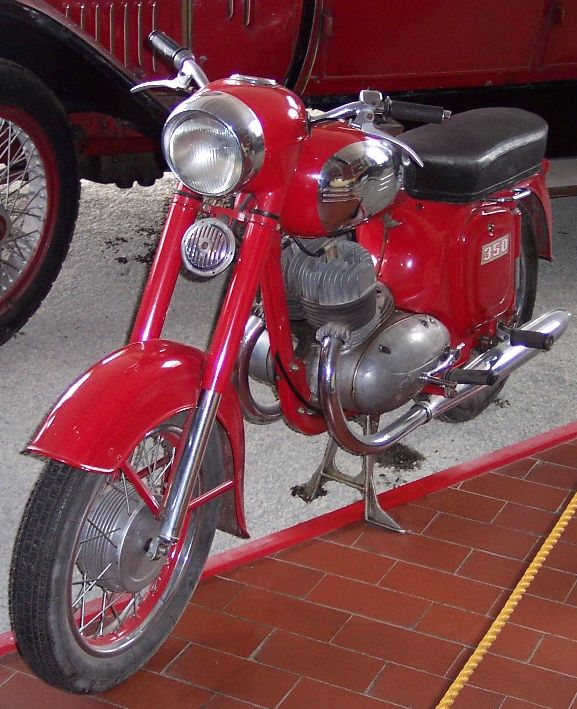
Jawa 350/354 from 1954, exhibited at the museum in Bad Oeynhausen, Germany

The Jawa 350 is a motorcycle, produced by Jawa Moto in Czechoslovakia since the 1930s until 1992 and in the Czech Republic until present. In the 1950s, with its two-stroke, air-cooled 343 cc engine it could reach speeds of 132 kilometres per hour (82 mph) and was exported into over 120 countries of the world.

The Jawa 350 remains popular thanks to its dominance of the Communist Bloc countries of Eastern Europe from the 1960s to the 1990s. Competitors of that time included the German MZ (250 cc) and Simson (250 cc Sport & Awo), the Hungarian Pannonia (250 cc), the Polish Junak (350 cc) and the Soviet IZh (350 cc). This was a period before the penetration of Eastern Europe by Japanese motorcycle manufacturers. In the early nineties was made additional model line Jawa 350 type 640.

The Jawa 350 two stroke twin cylinder motorcycle is still in production, although its styling and design has changed over the years, it is almost mechanically unchanged since the 1970s. It is imported and sold in the UK where the two 350cc two stroke models are named the "Classic" and the "Sport". 2012 UK models are equipped with electronic ignition, electric starters and automatic pumped oil injection. They are also imported and sold in Ireland and are distributed throughout Europe.

Jawa 350 was the first foreign motorcycle, available for sale in post-WWII USSR. The other only manufactures (until 1991) were ČZ (Chezet) and Hungarian Pannónia.

The 350/640 two-stroke twin is almost mechanically unchanged since the 1970s, it is still sold mainly to the countries of Latin America (Cuba and Argentina).

Because the Jawa 350 OHC (Shineray engine) meets the EURO V standards, it can be (unlike aged Jawa 350/640) sold in the European Union (Czech republik, Finland and Russia.

== Versions ==
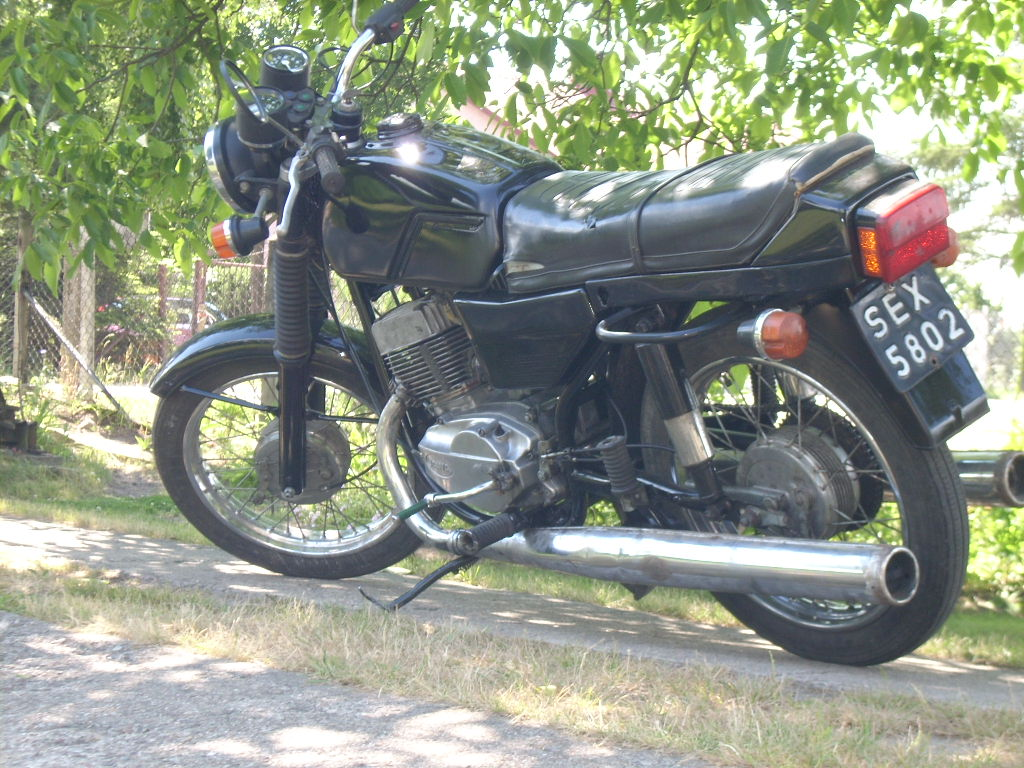
Jawa 350/638 Twin Sport from 1988

- 1934–1936: Jawa 350 SV - four-stroke single-cylinder motorcycle
- 1935–1946: Jawa 350 OHV - successor to 350 SV
- 1948–1956: Jawa 350 Pérák - two-stroke twin-cylinder
- 1954–1964: Jawa 350/354 - two-stroke twin-cylinder
- 1964–1974: Jawa 350/360 Automatic - two-stroke single-cylinder, with first automatic clutch in the world
- 1965–1969: Jawa 350/361 Sport - two-stroke twin-cylinder with larger 19“ wheels
- 1967–1973: Jawa 350/362 Californian - two-stroke twin-cylinder
- 1990-1992: Jawa 350-632 - two-stroke twin-cylinder 12 Volt alternator equipped slower version of 634 model in the style of the Jawa 350–638. Two variants.
- 1970–1972: Jawa 350/633 Bizon - two-stroke twin-cylinder
- 1973–1985: Jawa 350/634 - two-stroke twin-cylinder
- 1986–1994: Jawa 350/638 - two-stroke twin-cylinder (1986 model 34 HP @ 6,500 RPM / restricted to 25 HP @ 5,500 RPM after 1987 by baffle and piston redesign).
- 1984–1994: Jawa 350/639 - two-stroke twin-cylinder with front disc brake
- Since 1991: Jawa 350/640 - two-stroke twin-cylinder, in Style or Retro variations
- Since 2017: Jawa 350 OHC - four-stroke single-cylinder, fulfilling Euro 4-5, this model is based on Shineray chassis.

== Images ==
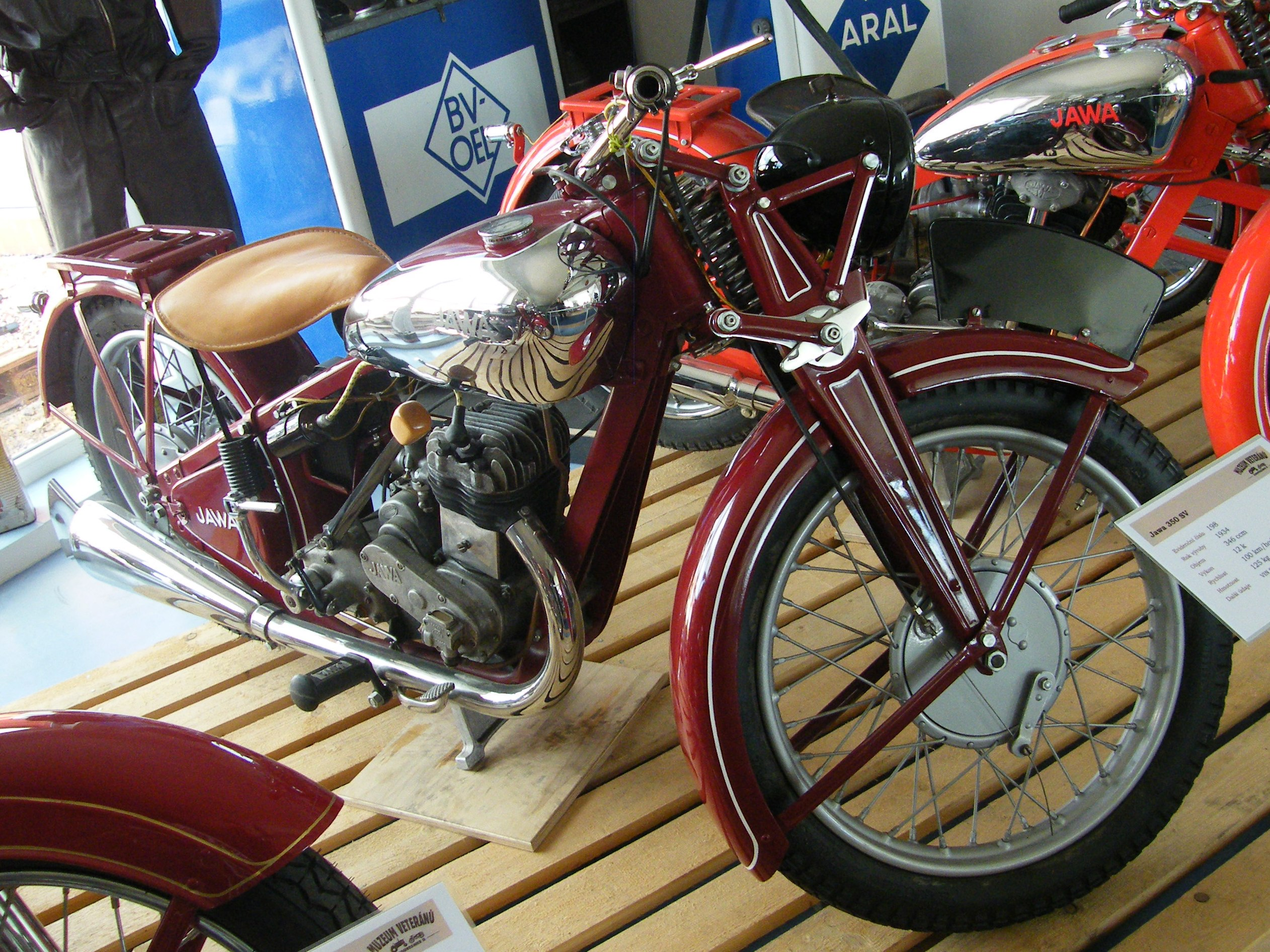
Jawa 350 SV

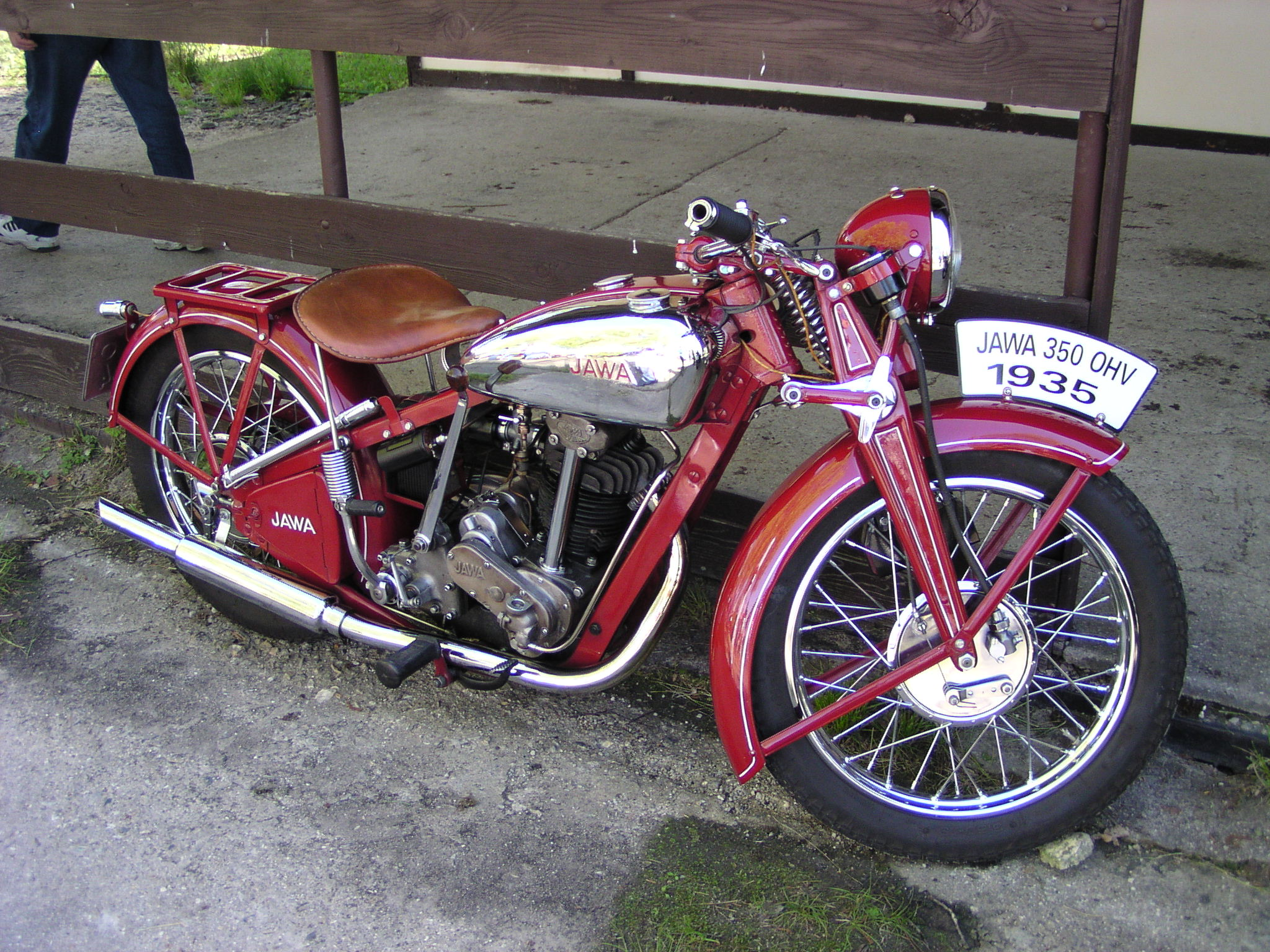
Jawa 350 OHV

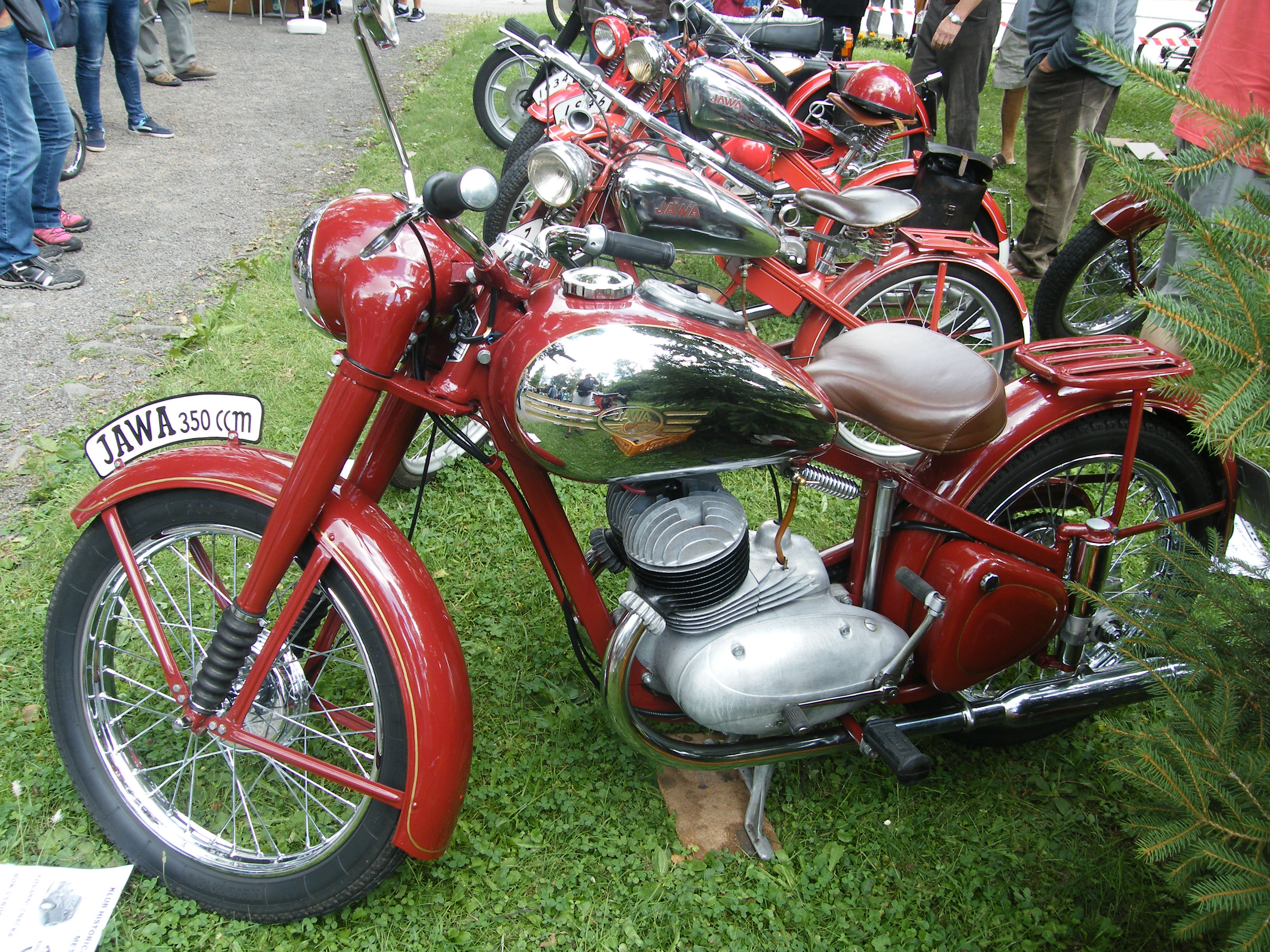
Jawa 350 Pérák

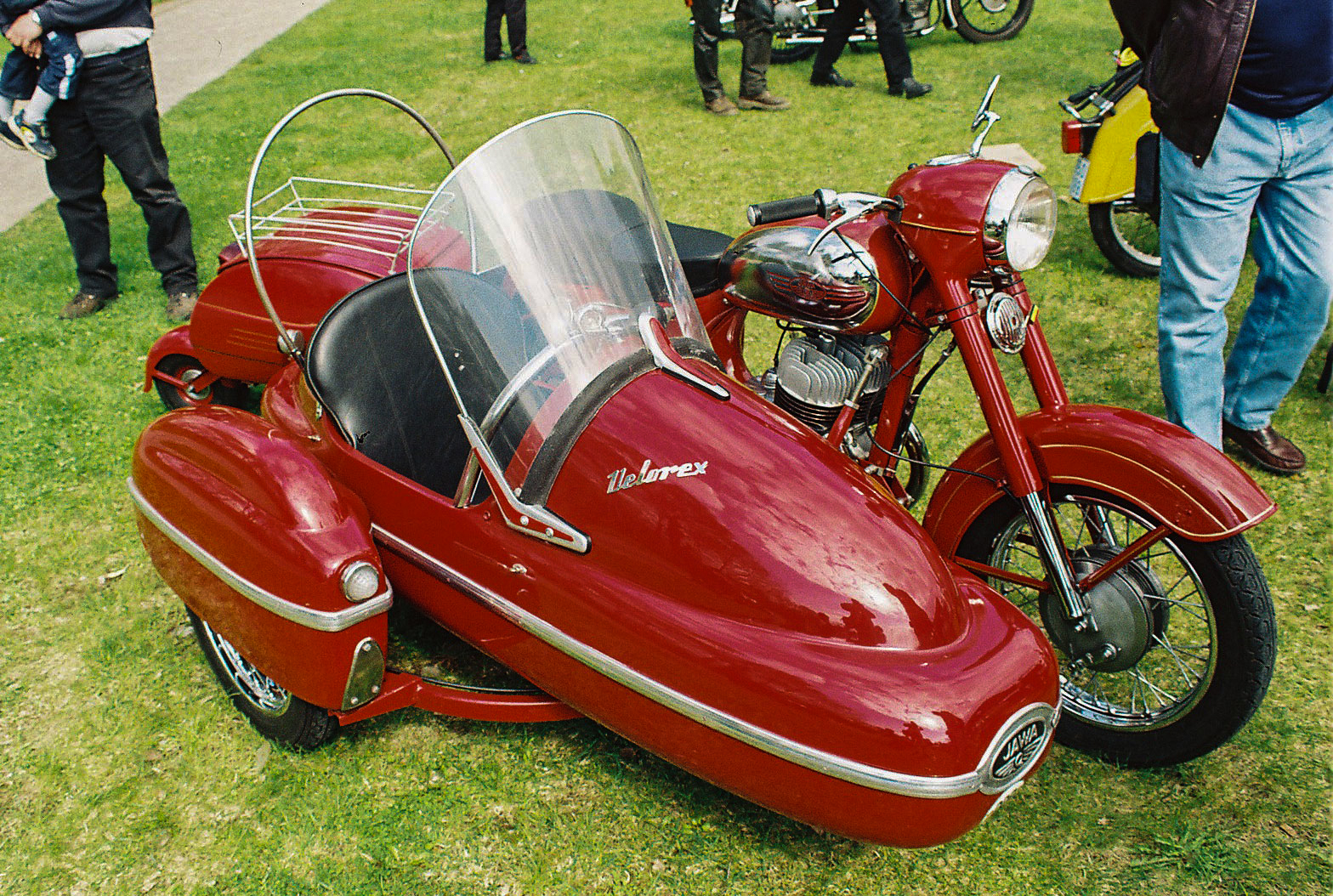
Jawa 350/354 with Velorex sidecar

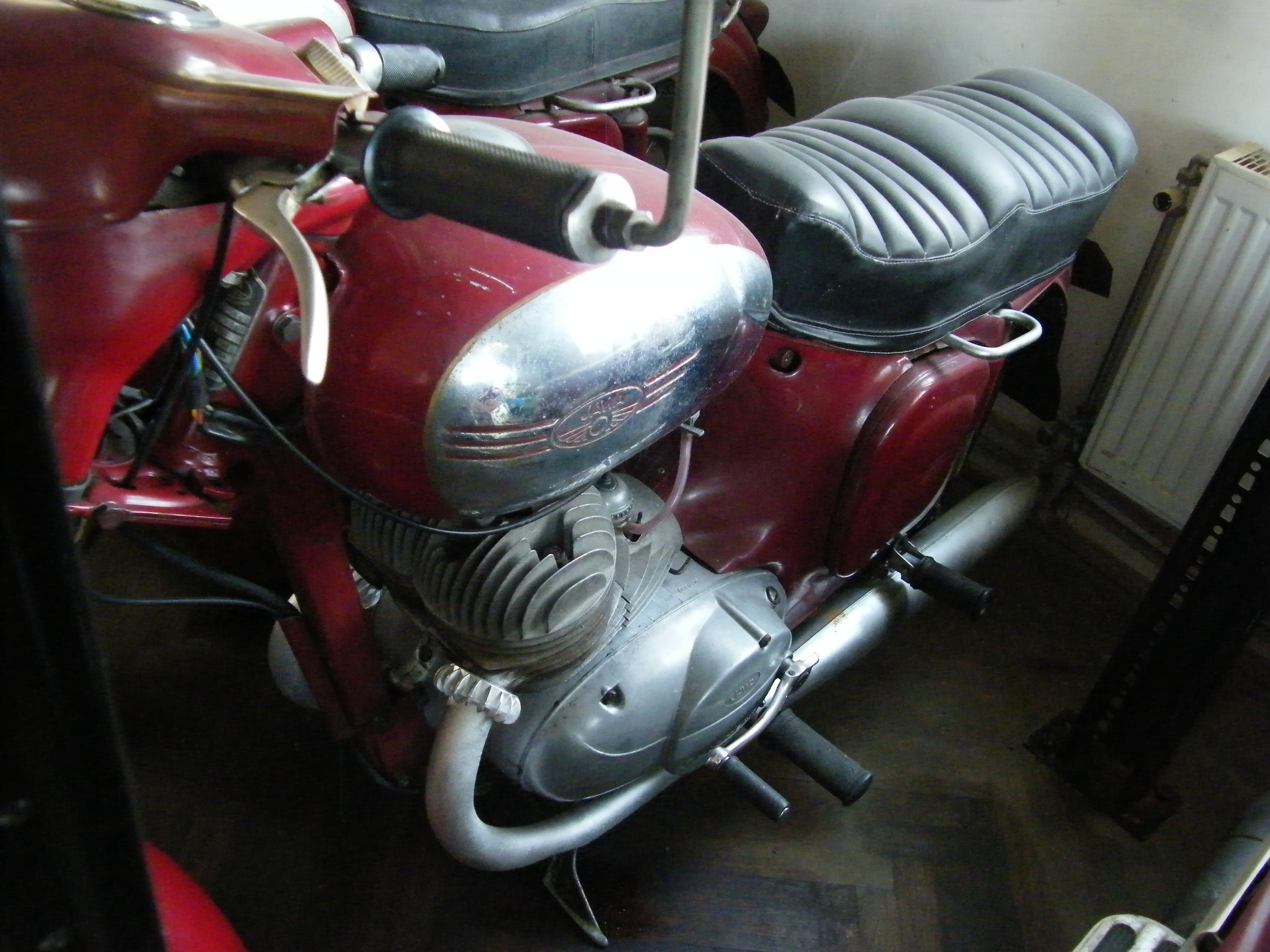
Jawa 350/360 Automatic

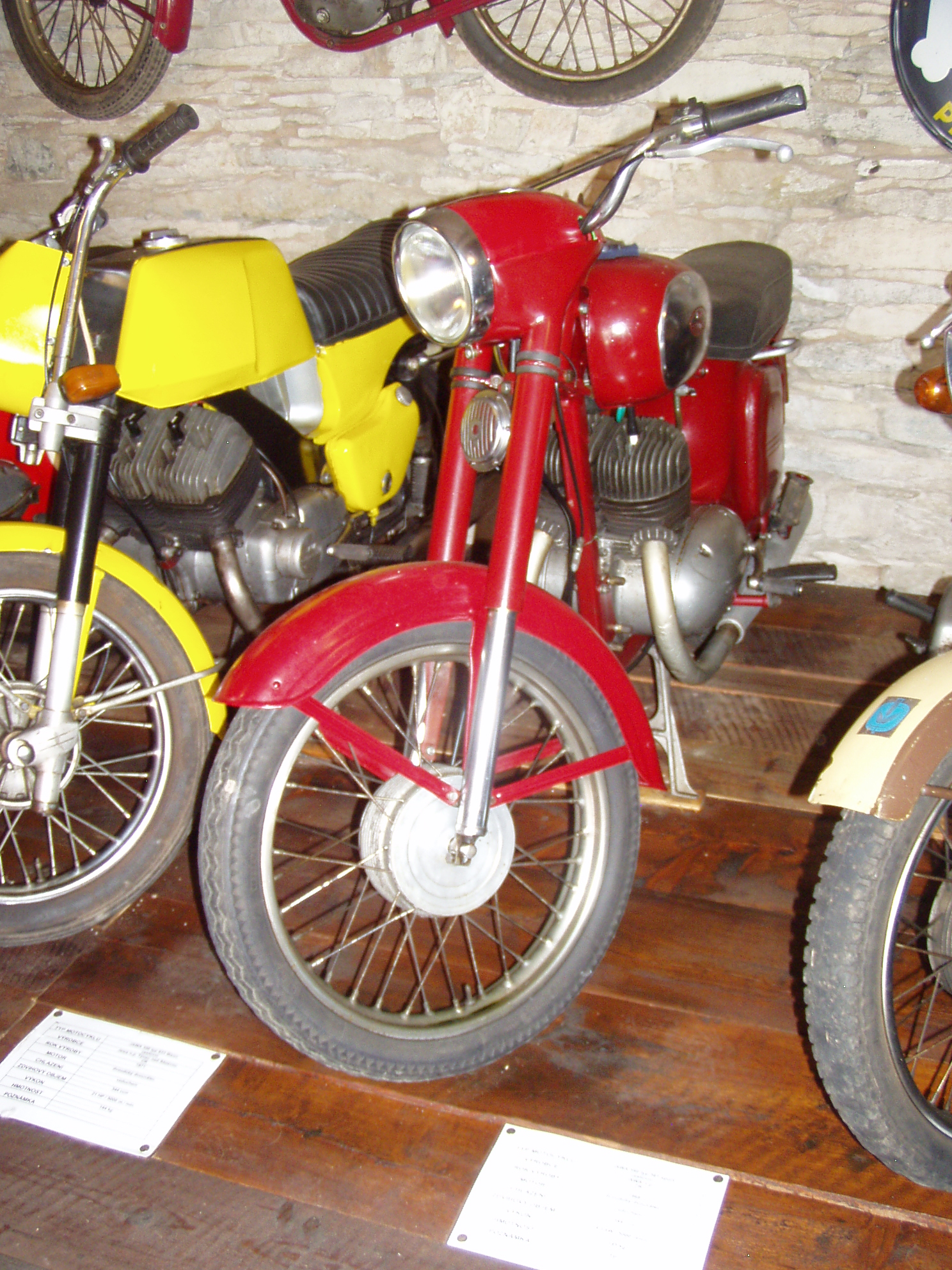
Jawa 350/361 Sport

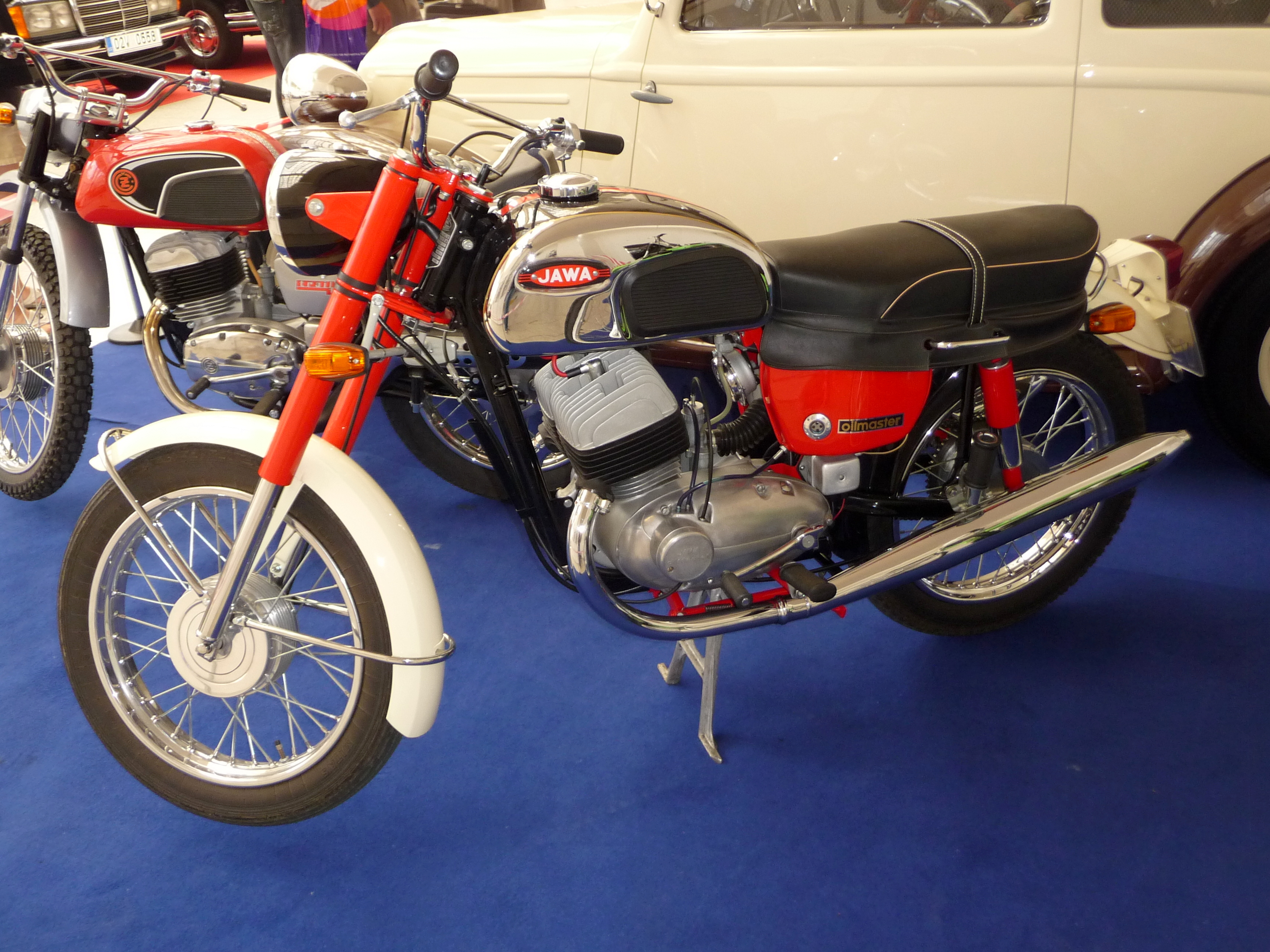
Jawa 350/362 Californian

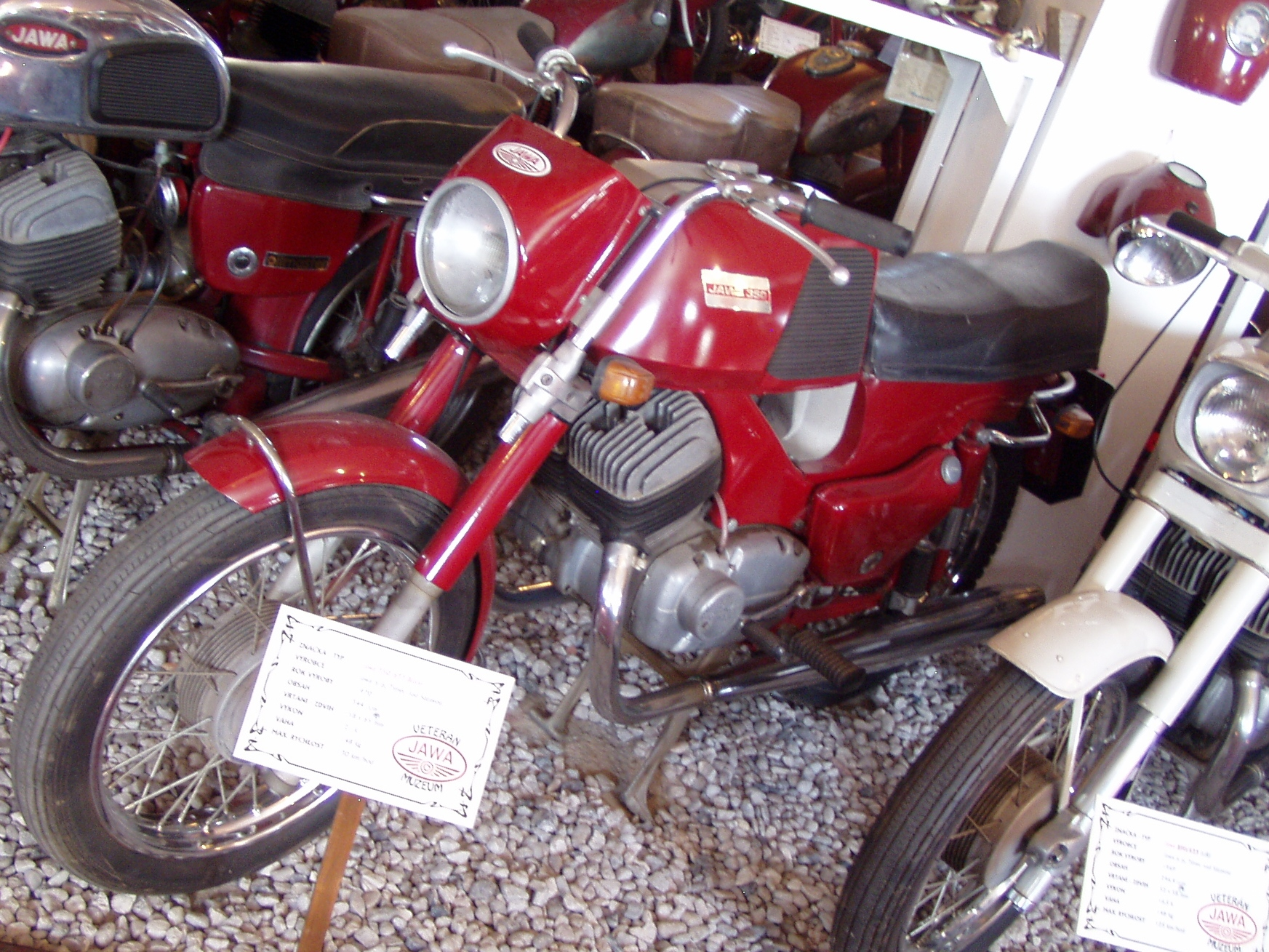
Jawa 350/633 Bizon

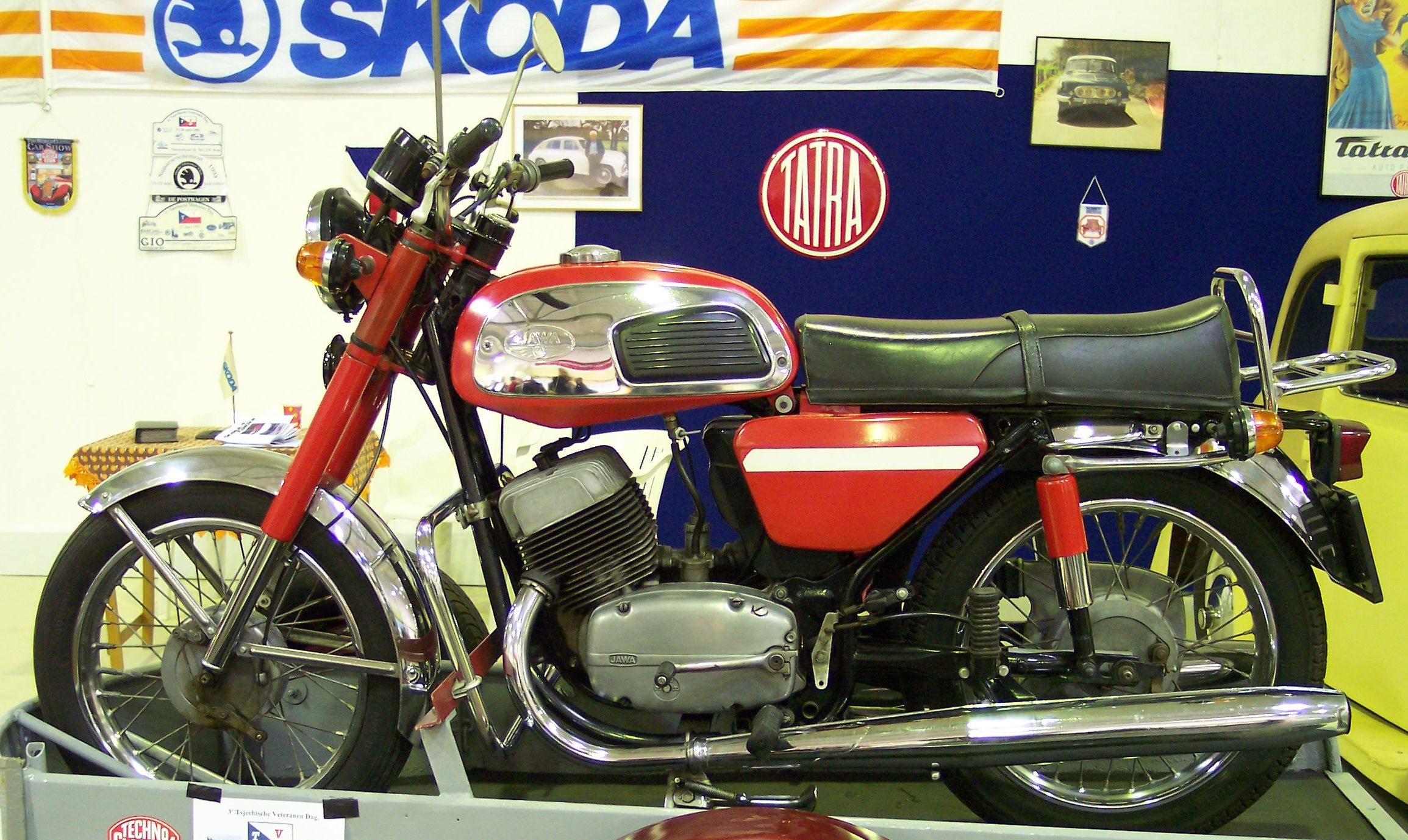
Jawa 350/634

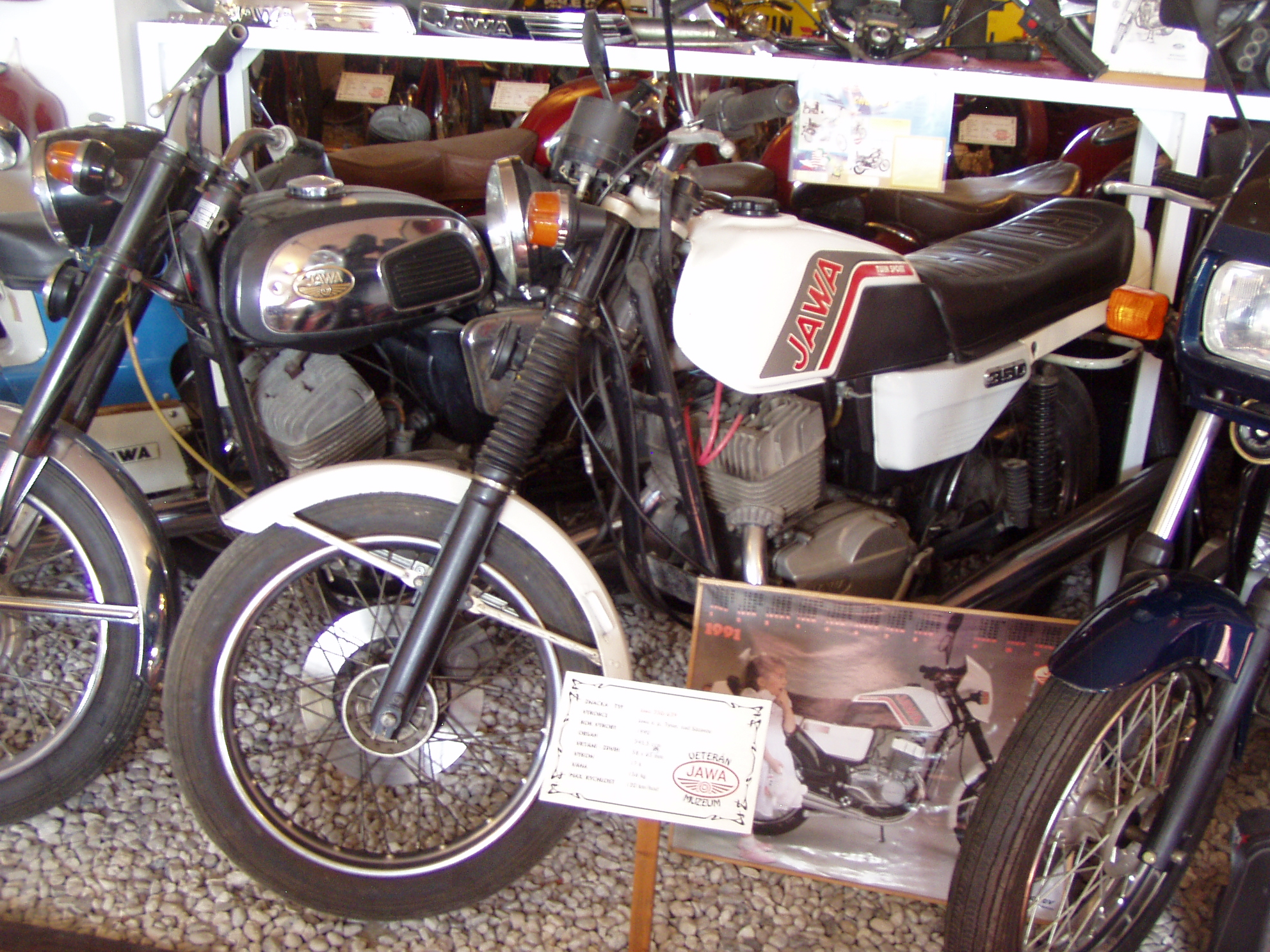
Jawa 350/639

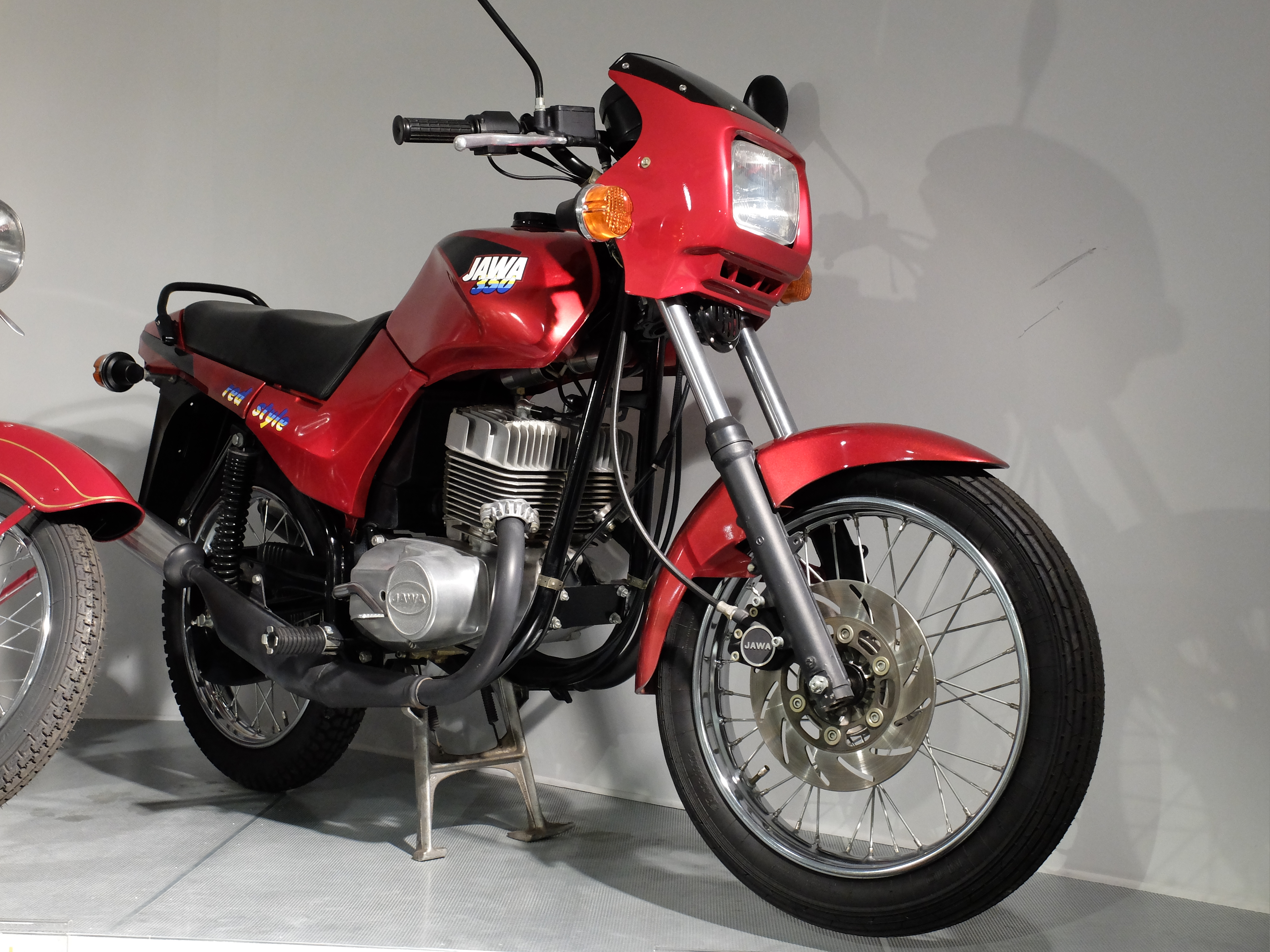
Jawa 350/640 Red Style

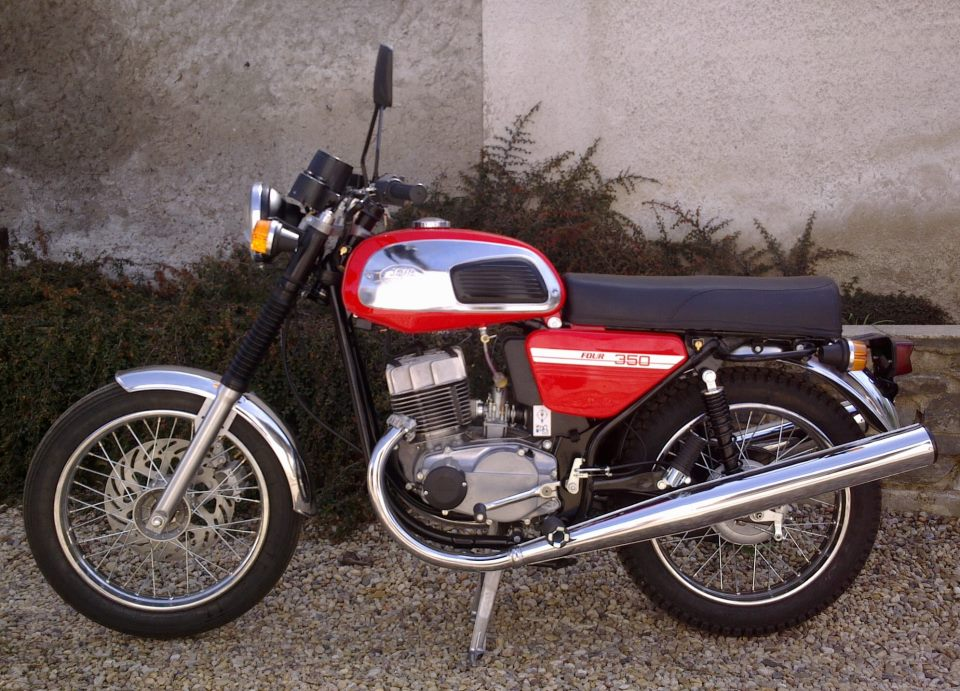
Jawa 350/640 Retro 634

== Jawa 350 OHC ==
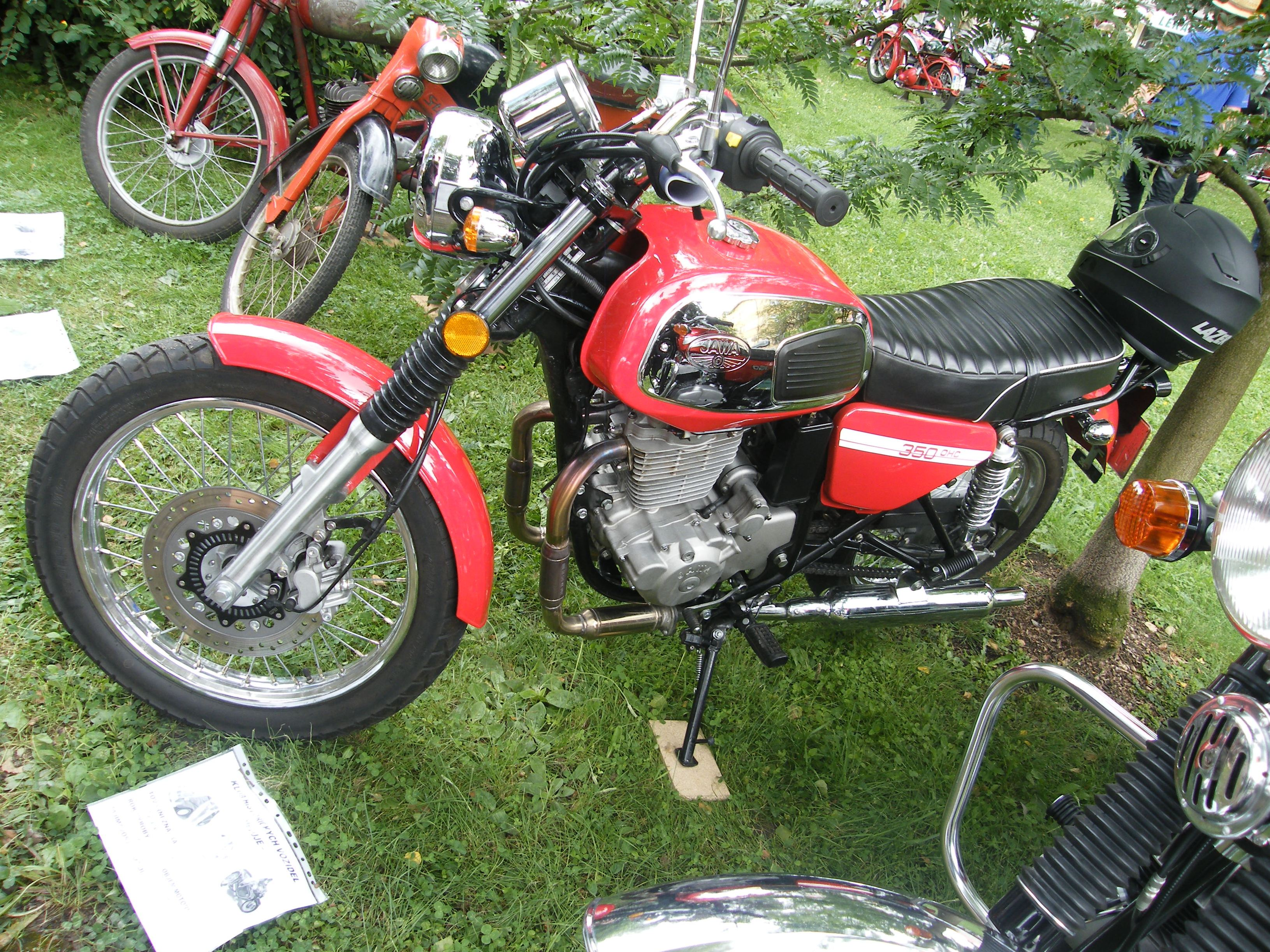
Jawa 350 OHC

The Jawa 350 OHC has been manufactured since 2017 and its design resembles Jawa 350/634 motorcycle from the 1970s. Unlike all previous Jawa 350 motorcycles, which were two-stroke twin-cylinder, this is a four-stroke single-cylinder from China. For the first time in Jawa history, this model is also equipped with ABS brake assist.

The design from the Jawa 350 OHC Special variant is inspired by the racing motorcycle Jawa 350/673 (a special, built in three pieces in 1967). It adopts a Café racer design. The third version Jawa 350 OHC Scrambler improves the off-road capabilities of the motorcycle, fuel tank is remaining the JAWA 250/353 (Kývačka).

All versions of the Jawa 350 OHC line-up are based on the Chinese-Made Shineray XY400.

=== Specifications ===
- Motor: air-cooled four-stroke single-cylinder with Delphi electronic injection
- Displacement: 397 cm3
- Max power: 20.4 kW @ 6500 ot./min
- Max. torque: 30.6 Nm @ 5000 ot./min
- Emission standards: Euro 4
- Wheelbase: 1420 mm
- Transmission: manual five-speed
- Wheels: Front 19", Rear 18"
- Tyres: Front 100/90/19, Rear 130/70/18
- Brakes: rear drum 160 mm, front disc 280 mm with ABS
- Dry weight: 160 kg
- Max. speed: 130 km/h
- Fuel consumption: 3.2 L/100 km

== See also ==
- JAWA 250
