= Jawa 353 =

Czechoslovak motorcycle

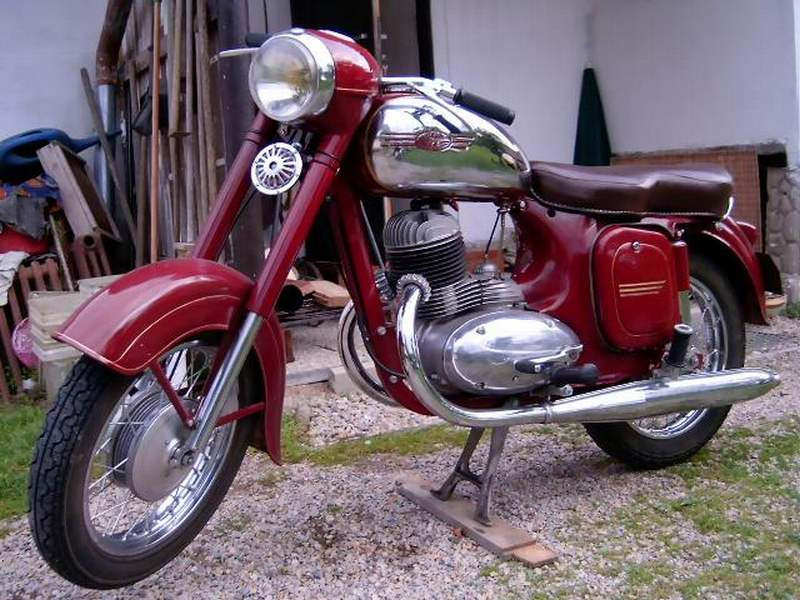
Jawa 250 - 353

Jawa 250 Type 353 was a standard motorcycle designed and manufactured by Jawa Motorcycles in Czechoslovakia starting from 1954 till 1962. This motorcycle succeeded Jawa Perak 250 in the year 1954 and later Jawa 250 Type 559 succeeded Jawa 250 Type 353 in the year 1962. The motorcycle was also manufactured in India by Ideal Jawa under license of Jawa Motorcycles from 1962 to 1973. Initially Ideal Jawa imported these motorcycles as CKD units and assembled in Mysore and sold them as the construction of the factory was not complete. Some variants of the same motorcycle were manufactured in Turkey and China. These motorcycles were famous for their symmetrical design language, ease of maintenance and reliability. This was the first Jawa motorcycle to have rear suspension springs, hence these were also called as "Kývačka 250" which translates to Spring 250 in English. There were basically four variants of Jawa Type 353.

== Jawa 353/01 ==
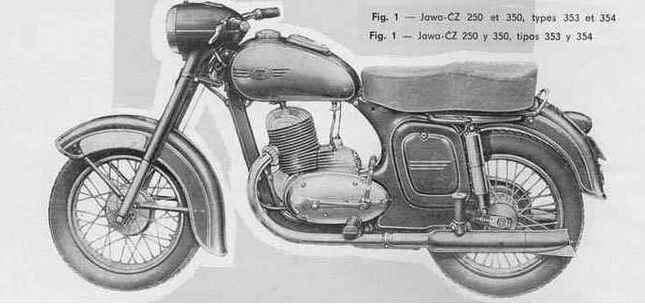
Jawa 250 - 353/01

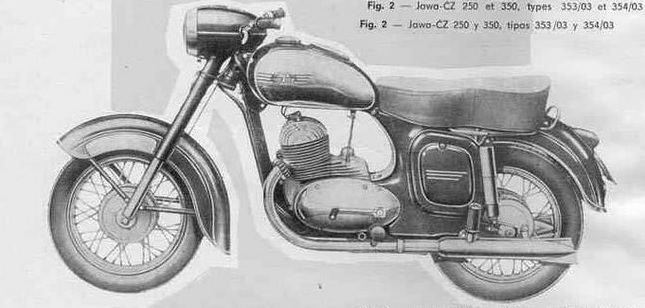
Jawa 250 - 353/03

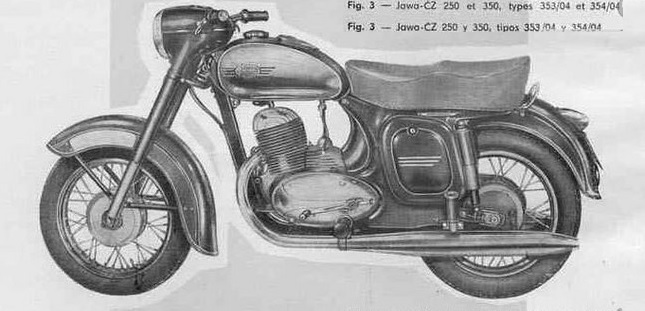
Jawa 250 - 353/04

This model was powered by a 248.5cc engine producing 12BHP, the transmission was of 4 speed and included an automatic de-clutching mechanism. The intake was through Jikov carburetor with 40mm wire mesh air filter directly attached to the carburetor. The silencer mufflers were designed to look like fish tails. The fuel tank had a capacity of 10 liters and accommodated an aluminum console with a switch box and ammeter. The seats were designed in the shape of a guitar for better ride comfort. The front tires were of the size 3.00x16 and the rear tires were of the size 3.25x16. The front and rear wheels had simplex brake drums. The kick start lever and the gear levers were mounted on the same shaft but worked independently. The rated top speed was 105 Kilometers per hour. This motorcycle came with adjustable steering dampers made using cork and rubber and also had a small pneumatic hand pump made by Velamos fitted under the seat.

== Jawa 353/02 ==
This variant was very similar to its previous model but the brake drums were upgraded with bigger and better ones and also the kick start lever and gear shift lever were integrated into one lever operating as both kick start lever as well as gear shift lever.

== Jawa 353/03 ==
In this variant the silencer mufflers were upgraded with cigar type design and the console on the tank was made using Bakelite instead of Aluminum. the front tire size was same as that of rear tire.

== Jawa 353/04 ==
The last variant in 353 model series did not see much upgrades but was redesigned by keeping costs in mind, hence the fuel tank capacity was increased to 12 liters, the console on the tank was removed and was replaced with just a switch box on the top of headlight nacelle, the air filter was bigger with an induction silencer. The bend pipes and the mufflers were joined using rubber seals and clamps. The complicated milling brake drums were replaced with simple but efficient drums. The pneumatic hand pumps were also removed.

== See also ==
- Jawa 250
- Balkan 250
