= Balkan (motorcycle) =

Bulgarian motorcycle manufacturer

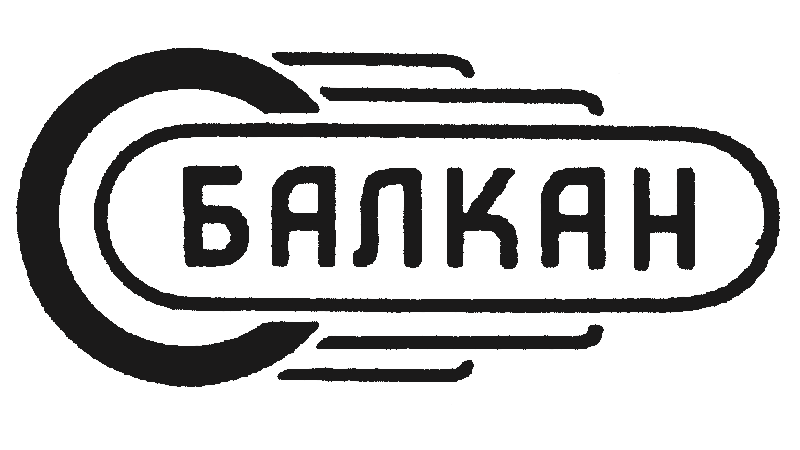
- Predecessor: DAR
- Founded: 1957
- Defunct: 1975
- Successor: Balkan AD
- Headquarters: Lovech, National Motorcycle Works, People's Republic of Bulgaria
- Products: Motorcycles

Balkan (Bulgarian: Балкан) was a brand of motorcycles, mopeds and bicycles manufactured in Lovech, Bulgaria in 1957–1975.

== History ==
Following the end of the Second World War, the DAR factory in Lovech was renamed to Plant 14. In 1954, a decision from Comecon ended aircraft production in Plant 14, which would result in many workers of the factory to lose their jobs. To counter this and also to meet the huge demand for personal vehicles which were lacking in Bulgaria, a decision came from the management of the plant, saying that Plant 14 will produce motorcycles and automobiles. The project manager was Eng. Dimitar Damyanov, who entered the factory as a specialist in aircraft construction. After the closure of the aircraft industry, the name of the factory was changed several times. It was named the Bicycle and Motorcycle Plant, the Balkan Automobile Plant, the Balkan United Enterprise, the Balkan United Plants, and the Balkan Machine-Building Plant. Since 1965, the plant has been called Balkan. In addition to motorcycles, the company produced Pirin-Fiat, Moskvitch and GAZ cars. Due to legislative changes in Bulgaria, motorcycles have been manufactured with turn signals from 1969 onwards. Motorcycles with 250 cc engine displacement were produced until 1971, the production of mopeds up to 50 cc lasted until 1975. A total of 271,562 motorcycles and mopeds were produced.

== 250 cc-class motorcycles ==
Balkan 250 S2
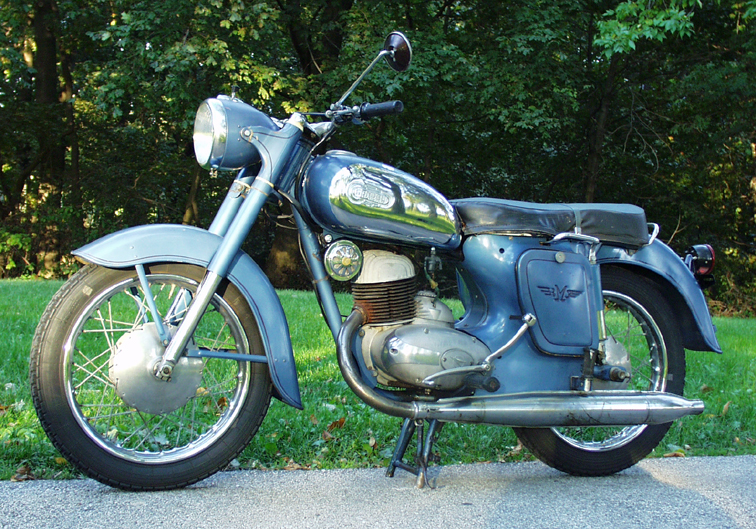
- Manufacturer: VMZ Plant Balkan
- Production: 1962-1971
- Predecessor: Balkan 250 M2
- Engine: 2-stroke 247.3 cc, single cylinder, aircooled
- Bore / stroke: 70mm × 64mm
- Compression ratio: 6.5:1
- Top speed: 110 km/h
- Power: 12.5 PS (9.2 kW) @ 4800 rpm
- Transmission: Wet clutch, 4-speed, chain drive
- Brakes: Front and rear drum
- Dimensions: L: 2130 mm W: 650mm H: 1036 mm
- Seat height: 730 mm
- Fuel capacity: 16 L

The project manager was Dimitar Damyanov. The first prototype of a motorcycle called the Balkan M1 was presented at the 17th International Fair in Plovdiv in 1956 and was largely based on DKW RT 250. The engine was made in Plant 12, Sofia. Production began in 1957, and by the end of that year, the first 100 pieces were made. However, obvious technical and structural similarities with the German motorcycle soon led to protests by DKW, and Bulgarian engineers were forced to change the appearance of the M1.

Production of the M2 began in 1959. Numerous changes were made during the modernization of the motorcycle, most notably a chrome side cover of the tank was added, in which there was a new emblem of the Balkan company. The MD 250 engine, which had a volume of 247.3 cc, 12.5 PS at 4800 rpm, consumption of 3.3 – 3.5 liters per 100 km and four gears. It was mechanically identical to the engine of DKW RT 250. Three engineers were sent for training to the Jawa-ČZ, so it was visually similar to Jawa 250/353 "Kývačka".

Another Bulgarian motorcycle in the series was the Balkan 250 S2 (sport), which had the same engine as its predecessor. The differences were in the speedometer, the upper limit of which was increased from 140 km/h to 160 km/h, the whole two-seater saddle instead of two smaller ones in a row. The maximum speed of all models was around 110 km/h. It cost 288 Bulgarian lev in 1962. Since 1969 these motorcycles were equipped with turn signals.

In the winter of 1959, the first 10 pieces of Balkan 250 K were produced, which were specially designed for racing. Compared to the standard models, they differed in the raised front fender and exhaust, smaller front headlight cover, speedometer located on the left side of the tank, aluminum cylinder with enlarged cooling fins and side stand, instead of central stand. They produced a power of up to 18 PS.

From 1970 to 1975, the Lovech plant produced a 175 cc motorcycle, Balkan 175. It featured a single cylinder, two-stroke engine, with a capacity of 173 cc and a power output of 13 PS. The top speed was around 110 km/h. It was visually and technologically very similar to its smaller counterpart, Balkan 75. The brakes were of drum-type and the rear wheel was connected to a swingarm suspension. The vehicle had a dry weight of 126 kg.

On the basis of Balkan 250 there were also prototypes of a cargo tricycle developed in 1959. Equipped with the Vitosha 250 engine, they could reach a top speed of 70 km/h and had a carrying capacity of up to 400 kg and two people. The front fork was Earles-type. Steering was done by a classic motorcycle handlebar, while the starting pedal was replaced by a lever. The driver and the passenger were protected by a sheet metal cabin with a glass front windscreen. In case of bad weather, the cargo could be covered by tarpaulin.

An unknown number of prototypes of Balkan 350 (350 cc) motorcycles were also produced for motocross purposes, however, little is known about these.

== Small motorcycles and mopeds ==
Balkan MK 50-3
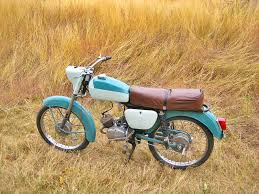
- Predecessor: Balkan 50 MK-2YU25
- Engine: 49 cc single cylinder, two-stroke, air-cooled
- Bore / stroke: 40,0mm x 39,0mm
- Top speed: 65 km/h
- Power: 3,3 PS (2,4 kW) @ 6500 rpm
- Torque: 4 Nm
- Transmission: Wet clutch, 3-speed, chain drive
- Dimensions: L: 1860 mm W: 655 mm H: 1015 mm
- Fuel consumption: 2.2 L/100 km

Since 1961 there were also single-cylinder two-stroke mopeds and mokicks produced in Lovech:

- Balkan 50 MP

Two series of this moped were produced: MP1 (1961–1962) and MP2 (1962–1967), also known as "Lyulin". The first series did not have a telescopic front fork and had only two gears, unlike the second one, which had three gears. Both mopeds had a frame made of pressed sheet steel, their engine with the designation MD 50 had a displacement of 48 cc and a power of 2.35 PS, a rotary knob on the handlebars instead of a shifting foot lever and starting with the pedals. It was a copy of DKW Hummel moped. In 1962, it cost 118 Bulgarian lev.

- Balkan MK 50 (MPS)

Manufactured in the years 1964–1967. Compared to the MP 50, it brought a number of design changes: an improved tubular frame, a new MD 50M engine with a capacity of 49 cc without pedals, 3 speeds, shifting with the foot lever on the left side and the exhaust located on the left. In addition, the appearance of the motorcycle changed.

- Balkan MK 50-2 (MPM)

A mokick with changed shapes of the tank and the headlight cover. It had the same engine as its predecessor with a power of 2.2 PS. Manufactured in 1967–1971.

- Balkan MK 50-2YU25

The transitional "intermediate type" from the MPM differed by the chrome side cover of the tank and the new MD 50S engine, which was later used on the MK 50–3.

- Balkan MK 50–3

New MD 50S engine with a total volume of 49 cc offered an increased output of 3.3 PS at 4800 rpm. A tool box was added under the seat and rear oil suspension instead of springs, the exhaust was located on the right. It was considered the most successful and competitive model in this category from the Plant 14 in Lovech.

The maximum speed of all models was around 60-65 kilometers per hour, a consumption of 1.5 – 1.8 liters per 100 km.

- Balkan M 75

The Balkan M 75, a motorcycle manufactured from 1971 to 1975, equipped with a two-stroke engine, which had a capacity of 74 cc, coupled to a 4-speed transmission and achieved an output of 6 PS at 6600 rpm. It had a top speed of around 90 km/h.

== Gallery ==
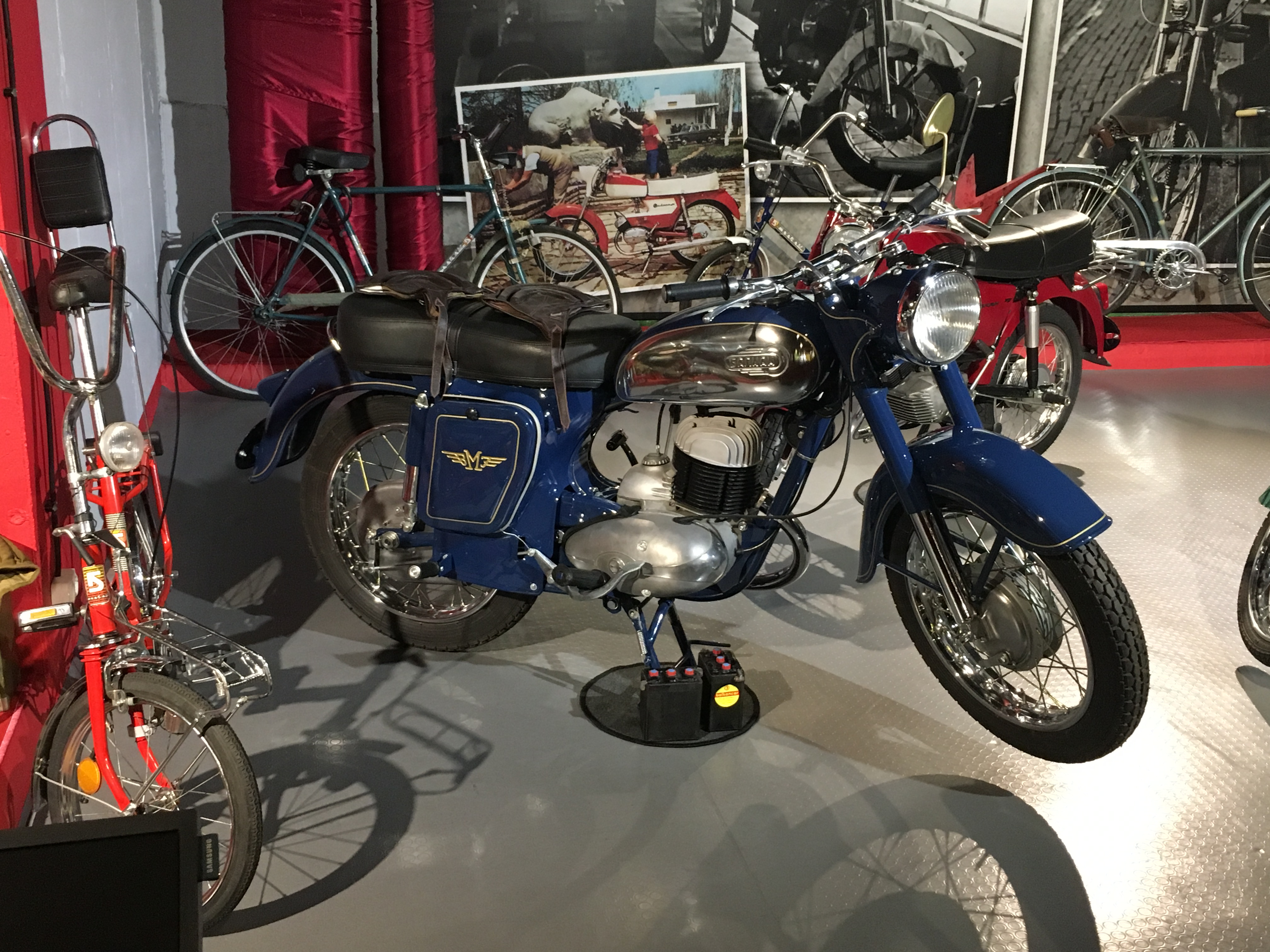
Balkan 250 S2

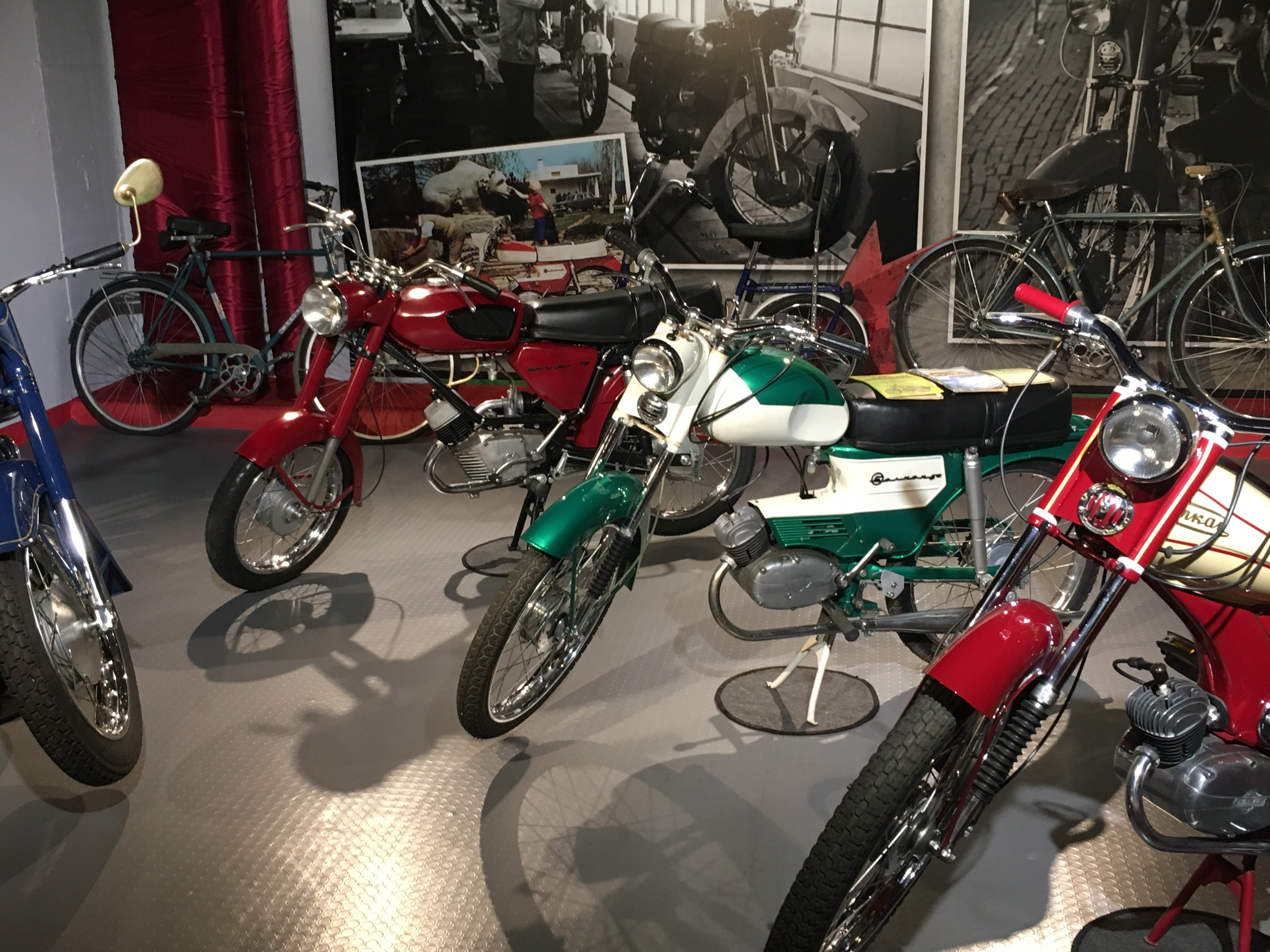
Balkan M 75 and Balkan MK 50 (MPS)

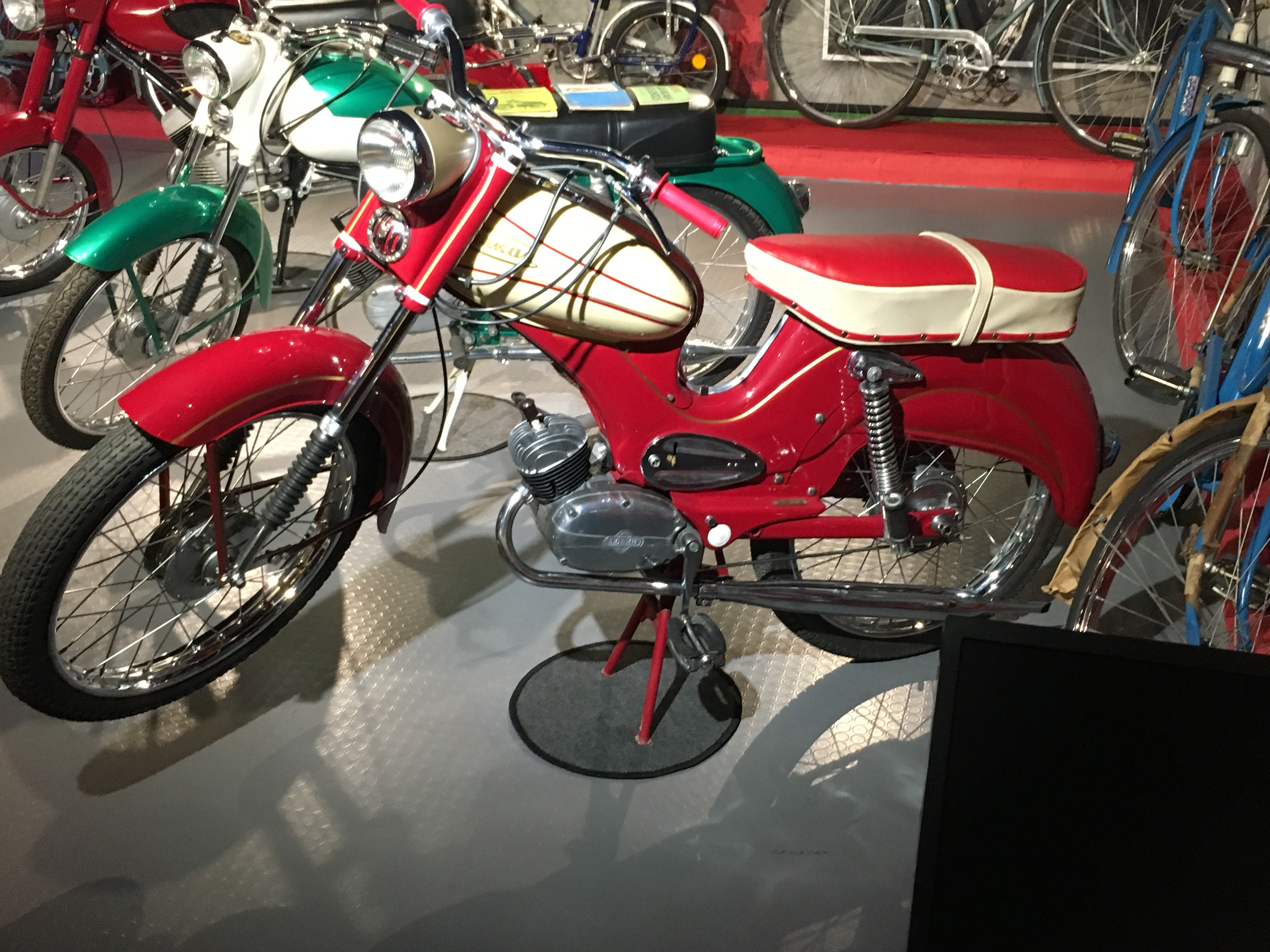
Balkan 50 MP2 „Lyulin“
