= Mercedes-Benz 250 =

Mercedes-Benz has sold a number of automobiles with the "250" model name:

- 1965–1967 W111
  - 1965–1967 250SE
- 1966–1967 W108
  - 1966–1967 250S
  - 1966–1967 250SE
- 1966–1968 W113
  - 1966–1968 250SL
- 1968–1972 W114
  - 1968–1972 250
  - 1969–1972 250/8
