= Jawa 250/559 =

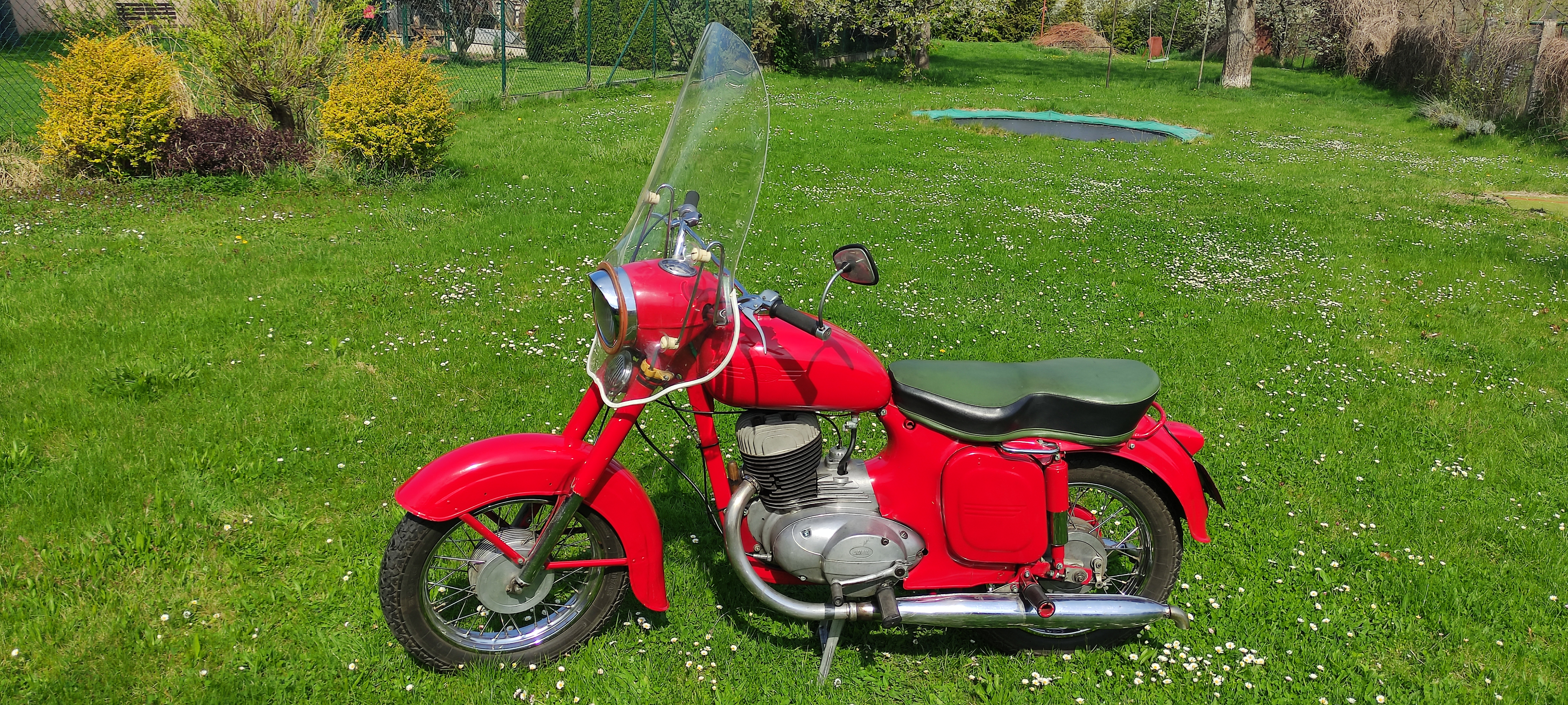
- Manufacturer: Jawa
- Production: 1962–1974
- Predecessor: Jawa 250/353
- Successor: Jawa 250/592
- Class: Standard
- Engine: 2 stroke 249 cc single cylinder Aircooled
- Compression ratio: 7.7:1
- Power: 14 hp (10 kW) at 4750 rpm
- Torque: 21 N⋅m (15 lbf⋅ft) at 3500 rpm
- Transmission: 4 speed Sliding Mesh
- Suspension: 130 mm front, 86 mm rear
- Brakes: Drum Brakes
- Tires: Early Models: Front 3.00x16, Rear 3.25x16 Later Models: Front 3.25x16, Rear 3.50x16
- Weight: 128 kg (dry); 140 kg (wet)
- Fuel capacity: 13.5 liters

Jawa 250 type 559 (known popularly as Panelka) was a standard motorcycle made by Jawa Motors from 1962 to 1974. It was preceded by the Jawa 250/353, and its successor was the Jawa 250/592. This was the first 250 cc model to be called Panelka. The Panelka series had the headlamp top nacelle stretched to the end of the handlebar with an oval speedometer instead of a circular speedometer on the headlamp top nacelle. For better security, the FAB switch box was used, whereas in the previous models a PAL switch box with nail type keys were being used. As in the previous models the rear tail lamp was made of translucent red plastic.

== Engine ==
This engine was more powerful with 14 hp (10 kW) compared to 12 hp (8.9 kW) of its processor, Jawa 250/353. The new engine was equipped with new a piston and cylinder, having larger intake channels. The carburetor was directly mounted on the cylinder, and the choke was controlled by the throttle grip.

== Versions ==
- Jawa 250/559/02 - manufactured in 1965
- Jawa 250/559/03 - reportedly made several pieces in the years 1963–1964
- Jawa 250/559/04 - from 1964 to 1974
- Jawa 250/559/05 - a famous model with an automatic centrifugal clutch.
- Jawa 250/559/06

== Technical specifications ==
- Frame: Rectangular Tube Frame
- Bore: 65 mm
- Stroke: 75 mm
- Compression Ratio: 7.7:1
- Tires: Early Models: Front 3.00x16, Rear 3.25x16 Later Models: Front 3.25x16, Rear 3.50x16
- Wheelbase: 1335 mm
- Dimensions: Length - 1980 mm, width - 650mm, Height - 1025mm
- Fuel Tank Capacity: 13.5 liters
- Fuel Economy: 30 Kmpl/65mpg
