= Jawa 250/592 =

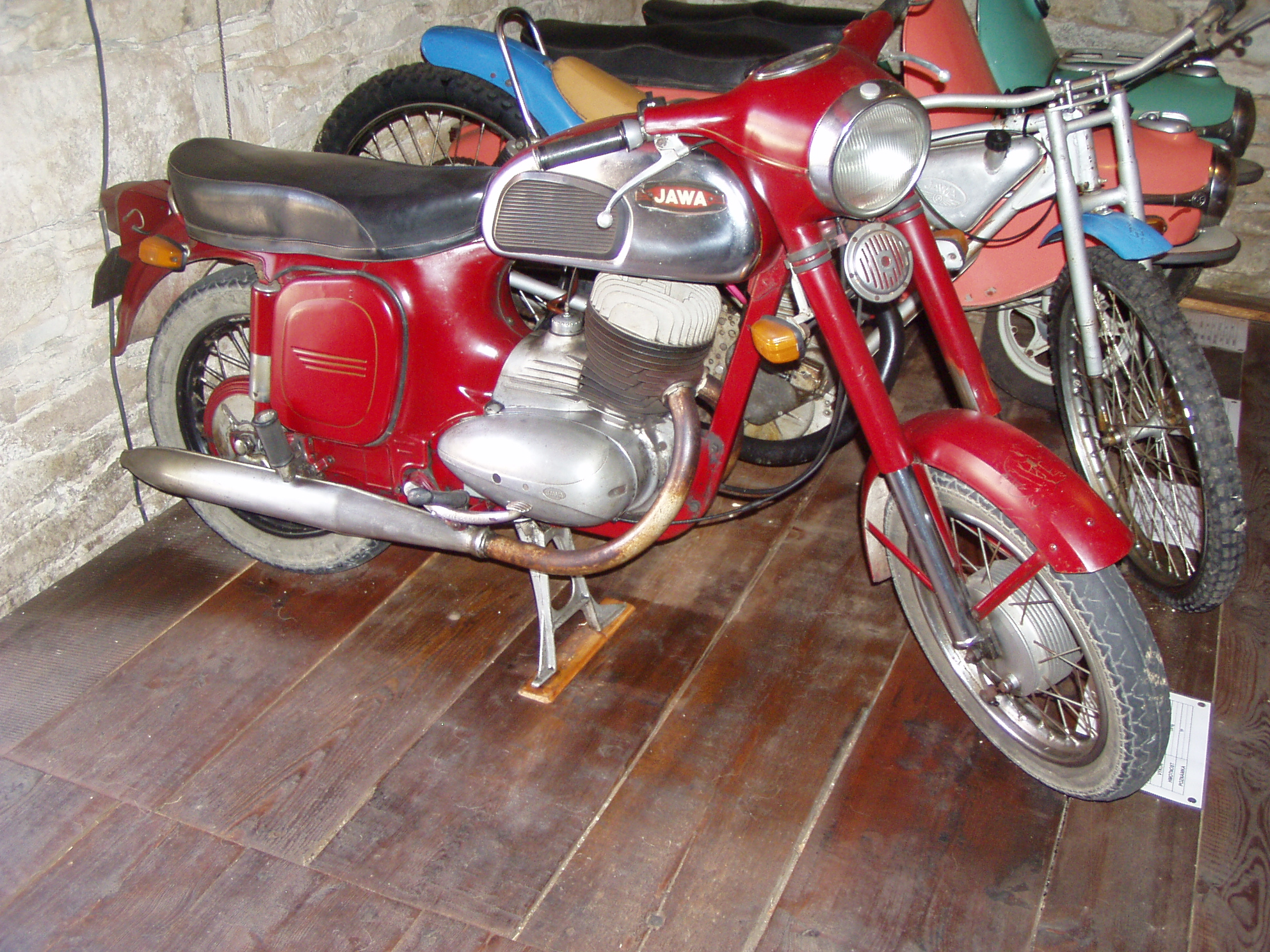
- Manufacturer: Jawa
- Also called: Jawa 250 Panelka
- Production: 1969–1974
- Predecessor: Jawa 250/559
- Class: Standard
- Engine: 249 cc (15.2 cu in), 2-stroke, air-cooled, single
- Bore / stroke: 65 mm × 75 mm (2.6 in × 3.0 in)
- Compression ratio: 8.1:1
- Transmission: 4-speed sliding mesh
- Frame type: Rectangular tube frame
- Suspension: 130 mm front, 86 mm rear
- Brakes: Drum
- Fuel capacity: 15 liters

Jawa 250 type 592 is a motorcycle popularly called Panelka and was developed by Jawa. It was manufactured from 1969 to 1974. The predecessor to this bike was Jawa 250/559 Panelka. Model 592 basically had only design innovations. Panelka series of motorcycles from Jawa had the headlamp top nacelle stretched to the end of the handle bar with an oval speedometer instead of a circular speedometer on the headlamp top nacelle.

== Changes ==
The most noticeable changes were in the design of the (a) headlight top nacelle which now housed a bigger and wider speedometer, (b) tank, which had flat sides with Jawa monograms when compared to the previous model which had a curved oval sided tank with "JAWA" pressed on it. It also had a bigger tail lamp(developed for unified series), turn indicators with right thumb control, the bike was also equipped with a more powerful dynamo. The design of the front mudguards was also changed.

== External sources ==
- Motowiki
- Motokari.cz
- jawa.cz
