= Divíšek =

Divíšek (feminine: Divíšková) is a Czech surname, a diminutive of the surname Diviš. Notable people with the surname include:

- Elmarita Divíšková (1910–2003), Czech dancer and dance educator
- Josef Divíšek (born 1990), Czech footballer
- Michal Divíšek (born 1976), Czech ice hockey player
- Nina Divíšková (1936–2021), Czech actress
- Tamara Divíšková (born 1934), Czech artist
- Tomáš Divíšek (born 1979), Czech ice hockey player
