= Talmberk =

- Municipal part of Samopše
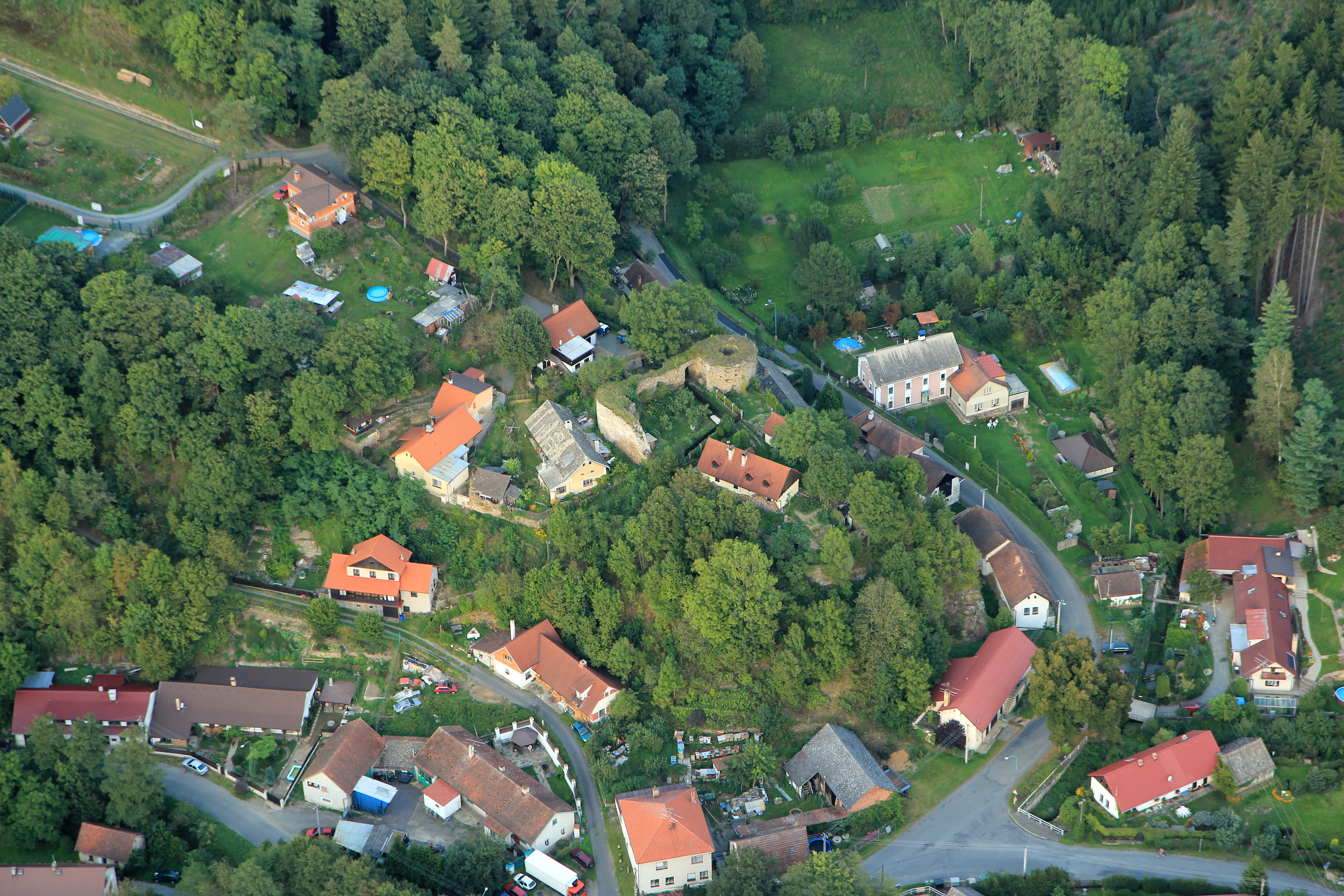
- Aerial view of Talmberk

- Location in the Czech Republic
- Coordinates: 49°52′01″N 14°57′19″E
- Country: Czech Republic
- Region: Central Bohemian
- District: Kutná Hora

Area
  - Total: 1.35 km^{2} (0.52 sq mi)

Population (2001)
  - Total: 40
  - Density: 30/km^{2} (77/sq mi)
- Time zone: UTC+1 (CET)
  - Summer (DST): UTC+2 (CEST)
- Postal code: 285 05

Talmberk (German: Talmberg or Talenberg) is a small village and municipal part of Samopše in the Kutná Hora District of the Czech Republic. The village was built around Talmberk Castle, which was constructed in the 13th century, but abandoned by 1533.

== History ==
Talmberk was founded at the end of the 13th century, likely by Hroznata of Úžice. The castle is first attested in 1297, in the name William of Talmberk. The castle remained in the Talmberk family until 1390, when Havel Medek of Valdek and his brother William captured the castle from Diviš of Talmberk. Diviš regained control of the castle in 1397. When Diviš died in 1415 his son Oldřich inherited Talmberk. The Lords of Talmberk lost ownership of the castle by 1473, and by 1533, it was abandoned altogether.

The inhabitants of the village began utilizing the castle stones for construction, which persisted into the 19th century. In 1933, part of the remaining structure collapsed.

The ruins of Talmberk Castle have been a protected cultural monument since 1966.

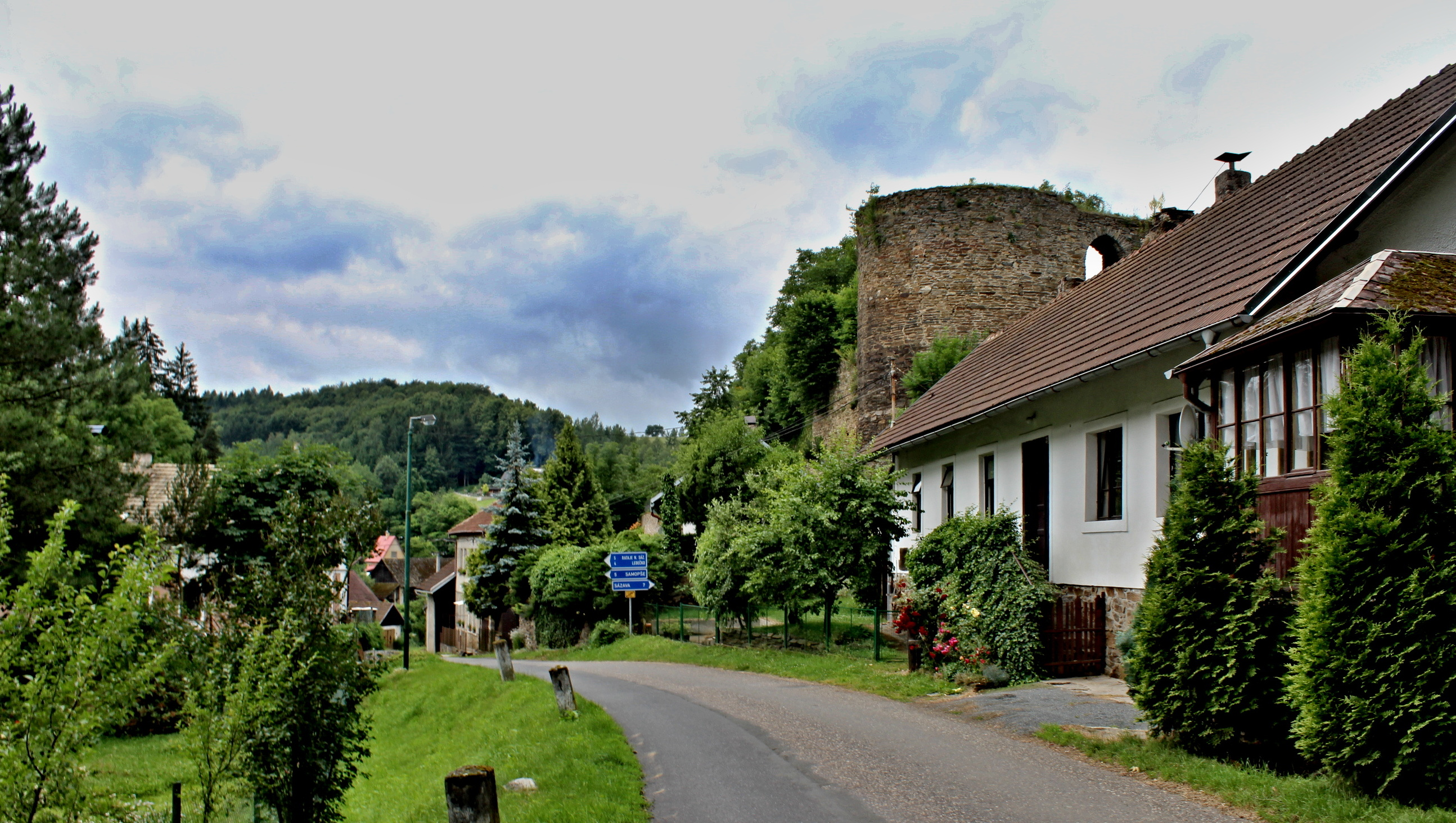
Talmberk, as seen in 2016

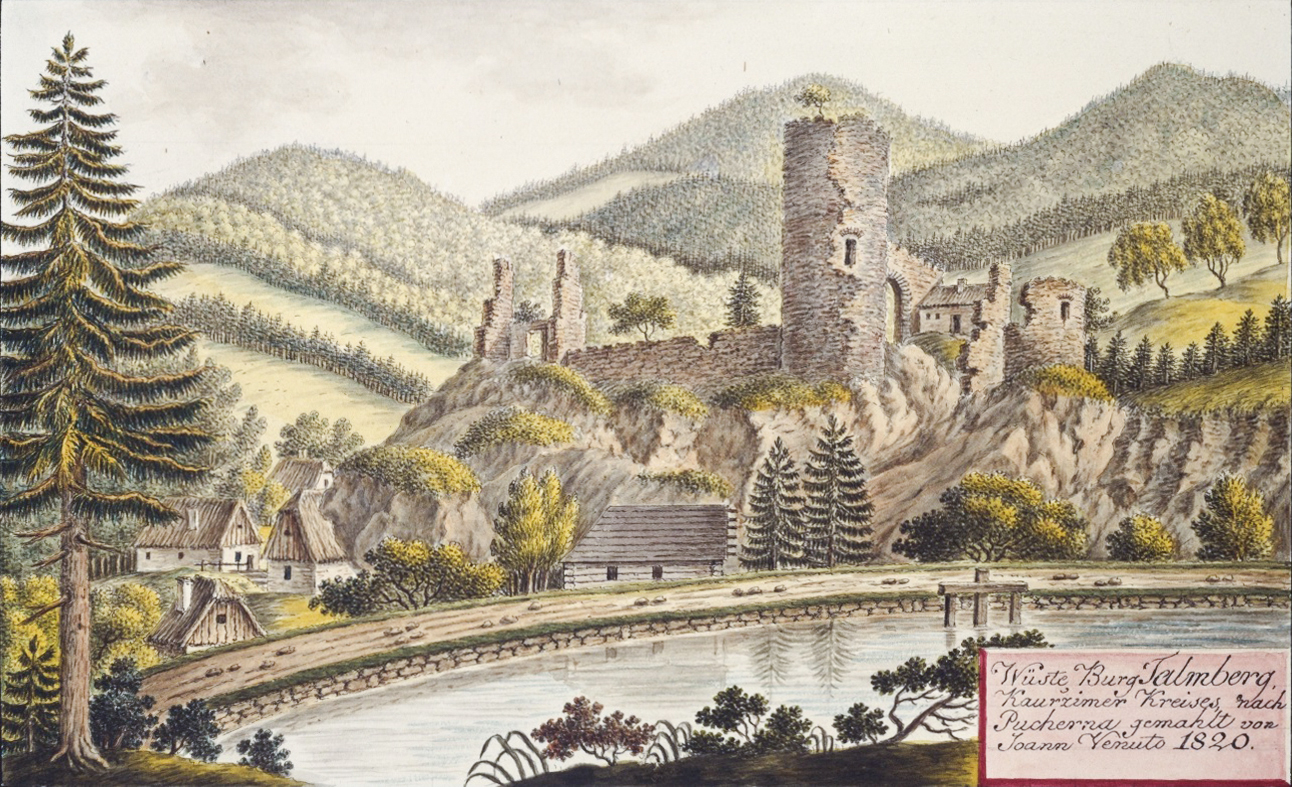
The ruins of Talmberk Castle, as painted by Joann Venuto in 1820

== In popular culture ==
The town's 1403 recreation under the lordship of Diviš of Talmberk was prominently featured in the Czech role-playing game Kingdom Come: Deliverance. Other castles featured in the game are Pirkstein, the Upper castle of Rattay (both in Rataje nad Sázavou), and the castle in Silver Skalitz.
