= Diviš =

Diviš (feminine: Divišová) is a Czech surname and first name, a Czech variant of the name Dionysus. Notable people with the name include:

== Surname ==
- Alén Diviš (1900–1956), Czech painter
- Ivan Diviš (1924–1999), Czech poet
- Jakub Diviš (born 1986), Czech footballer
- Jaroslav Diviš (born 1986), Czech footballer
- Karel Diviš (born 1976), Czech entrepreneur
- Lukáš Diviš (born 1986), Slovak volleyball player
- Richard Diviš (born 1985), Czech hockey player
- Petra Divišová (born 1984), Czech footballer
- Václav Prokop Diviš (1698–1765), Czech inventor

== First name ==
- Diviš Bořek of Miletínek (c. 1360s – 8 January 1438), Bohemian military leader
- Diviš of Talmberk (?–1415), Bohemian noble

== See also ==
- Divíšek, diminutive form of Diviš
- Divis (surname)
- Divišov
