= Samopše =

- Municipality
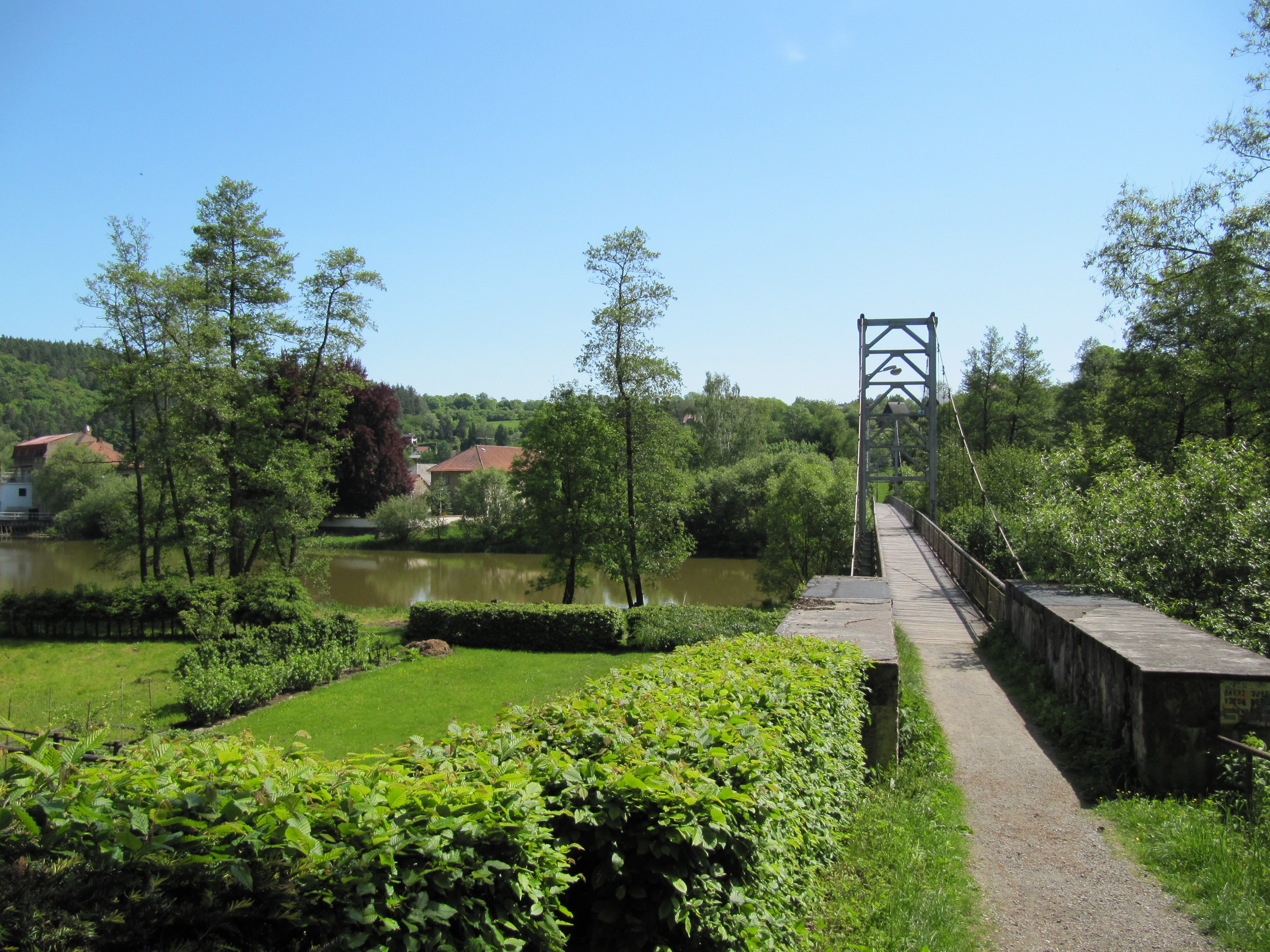
- Bridge over the Sázava River

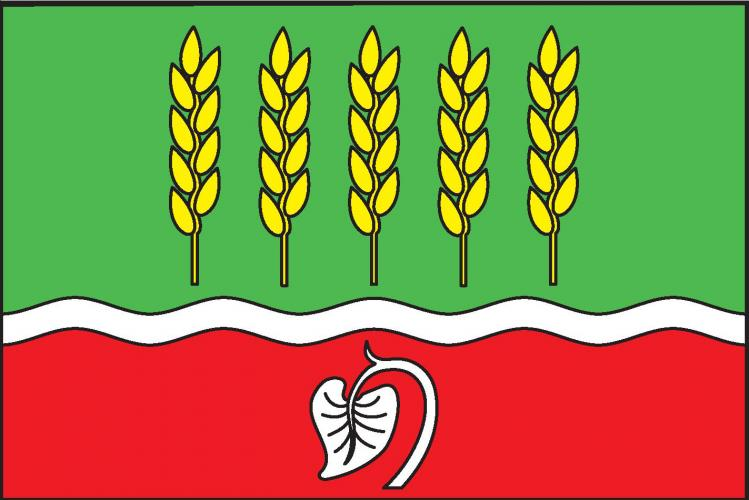
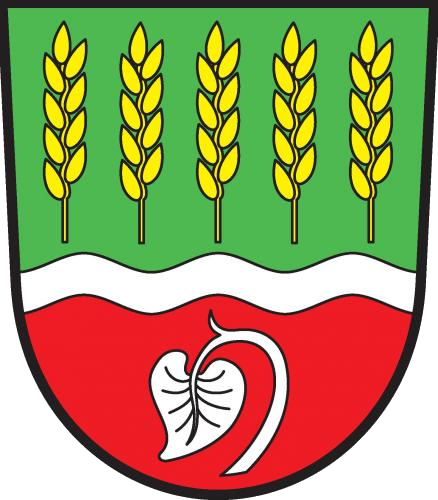
- Flag Coat of arms

- Location in the Czech Republic
- Coordinates: 49°51′41″N 14°55′48″E
- Country: Czech Republic
- Region: Central Bohemian
- District: Kutná Hora
- First mentioned: 1397

Area
  - Total: 6.59 km^{2} (2.54 sq mi)
- Elevation: 343 m (1,125 ft)

Population (2026-01-01)
  - Total: 221
  - Density: 33.5/km^{2} (86.9/sq mi)
- Time zone: UTC+1 (CET)
  - Summer (DST): UTC+2 (CEST)
- Postal code: 285 06
- Website: www.samopse.cz

Samopše is a municipality and village in Kutná Hora District in the Central Bohemian Region of the Czech Republic. It has about 200 inhabitants.

== Administrative division ==
Samopše consists of five municipal parts (in brackets population according to the 2021 census):

- Samopše (91)
- Budín (50)
- Mrchojedy (6)
- Přívlaky (45)
- Talmberk (71)

== Etymology ==
The name was derived from samopše, which is an Old Czech term for 'spelt'.

== Geography ==
Samopše is located 26 kilometres (16 mi) southwest of Kutná Hora and 35 km (22 mi) southeast of Prague. Most of the municipal territory lies in the Vlašim Uplands, only the eastern tip extends into the Upper Sázava Hills. The highest point is the hill Jestřáb at 436 m (1,430 ft) above sea level. The Sázava River flows through the municipality.

== History ==
The first written mention of Samopše is from 1397.

== Demographics ==
Historical population

Year	Pop.	±%
1869	618	—
1880	610	−1.3%
1890	608	−0.3%
1900	619	+1.8%
1910	537	−13.2%

Year	Pop.	±%
1921	492	−8.4%
1930	376	−23.6%
1950	323	−14.1%
1961	356	+10.2%
1970	272	−23.6%

Year	Pop.	±%
1980	210	−22.8%
1991	123	−41.4%
2001	112	−8.9%
2011	162	+44.6%
2021	263	+62.3%

Source: Censuses

== Transport ==
There are no railways or major roads passing through the municipality.

== Sights ==
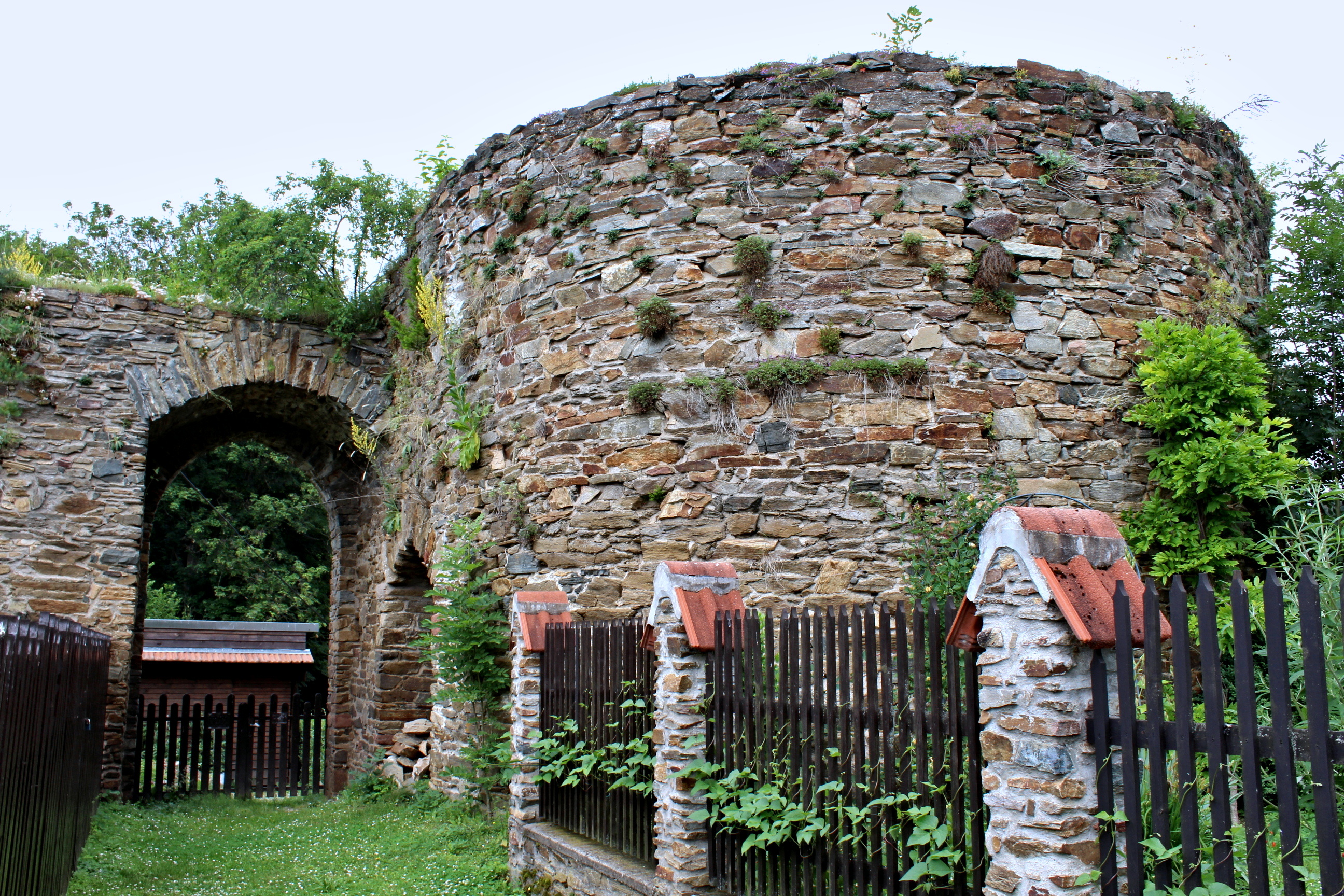
Ruin of the Talmberk Castle

The only notable monument in the municipality is the ruin of the Talmberk Castle. The castle was probably founded at the beginning of the 14th century. In 1533, it was described as abandoned, so it was abandoned probably at the beginning of the 16th century. The perimeter wall with the gate, the lower part of the cylindrical bergfried and relics of the palace have survived to this day.

In Mrchojedy is a sandstone conciliation cross of unknown age. This type of monument is unusual for the region.

== In popular culture ==
A 15th century recreation of Samopše, Mrchojedy and Talmberk is featured in the video game Kingdom Come: Deliverance.
