= Talmberk family =

Bohemian noble family

- Noble family
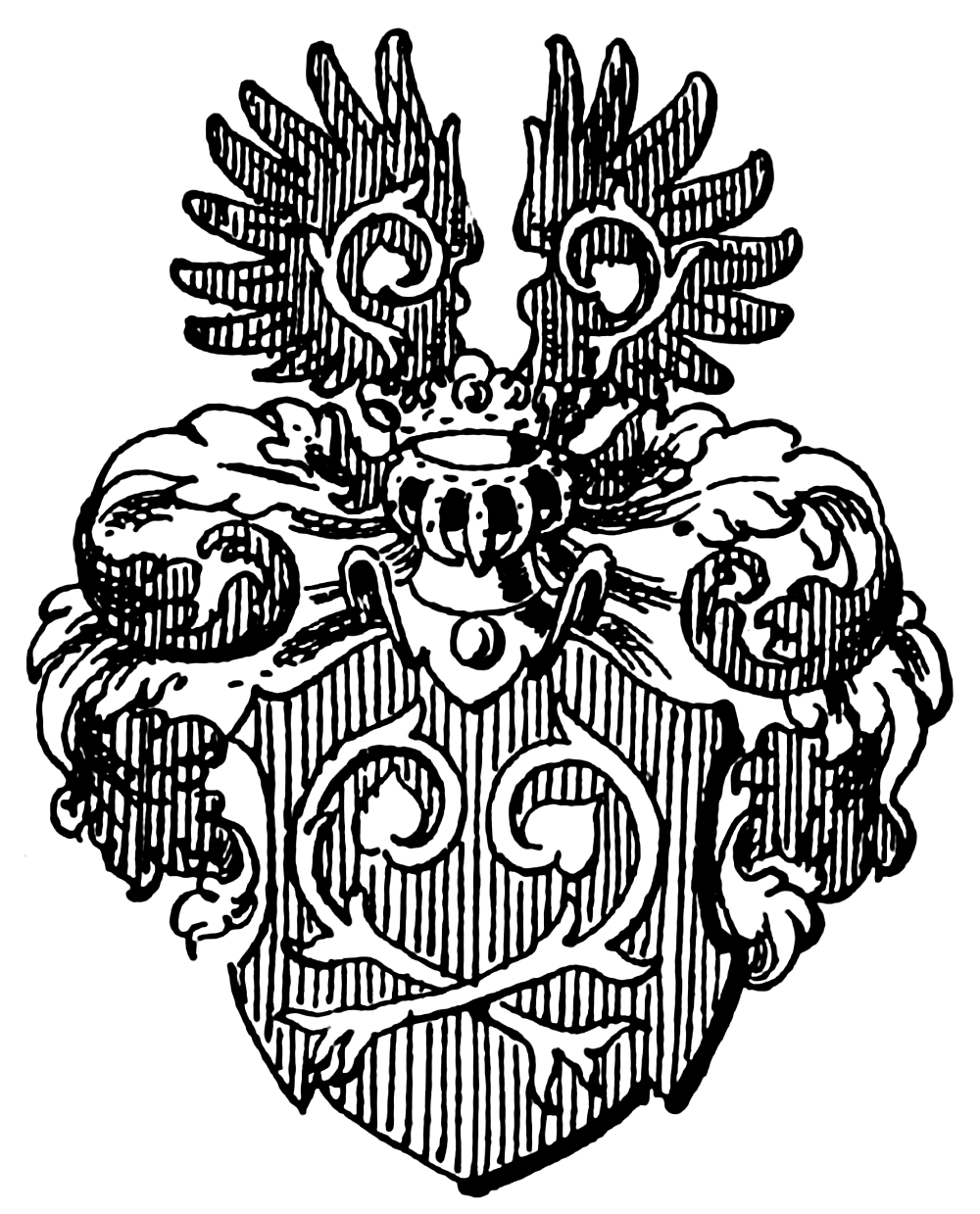
- Parent family: Kounice family
- Country: Bohemia
- Origin: Talmberk, Bohemia
- Founder: Hroznata of Úžice

The Talmberk family (German: Talmberg or Talenberg) was a Bohemian noble house. The family ruled the town of Talmberk and Talmberk Castle, along with various other estates.

== History ==
The Talmberk family was descended from the Kounice family of Bohemia and Moravia. The Talmberk family was founded at the end of the 13th century. The first known member is William of Talmberk, a descendant of Hroznata of Úžice who was first mentioned in 1297.

The family came under the ownership of Jankov in 1418. They remained in possession of the village until 1702, when it was sold.

The Talmberk Codex remained in the family from the 16th century until the death of the last member. It was later given to the Library of the National Museum of the National Museum in Prague.

The Talmberks largely sided with the House of Habsburg during the Bohemian Revolt, and they were allowed to remain in the gentlemen's class. At the end of the 16th century, the family had split into separate branches. The last male member of the family died in 1735.

== Coat of arms ==
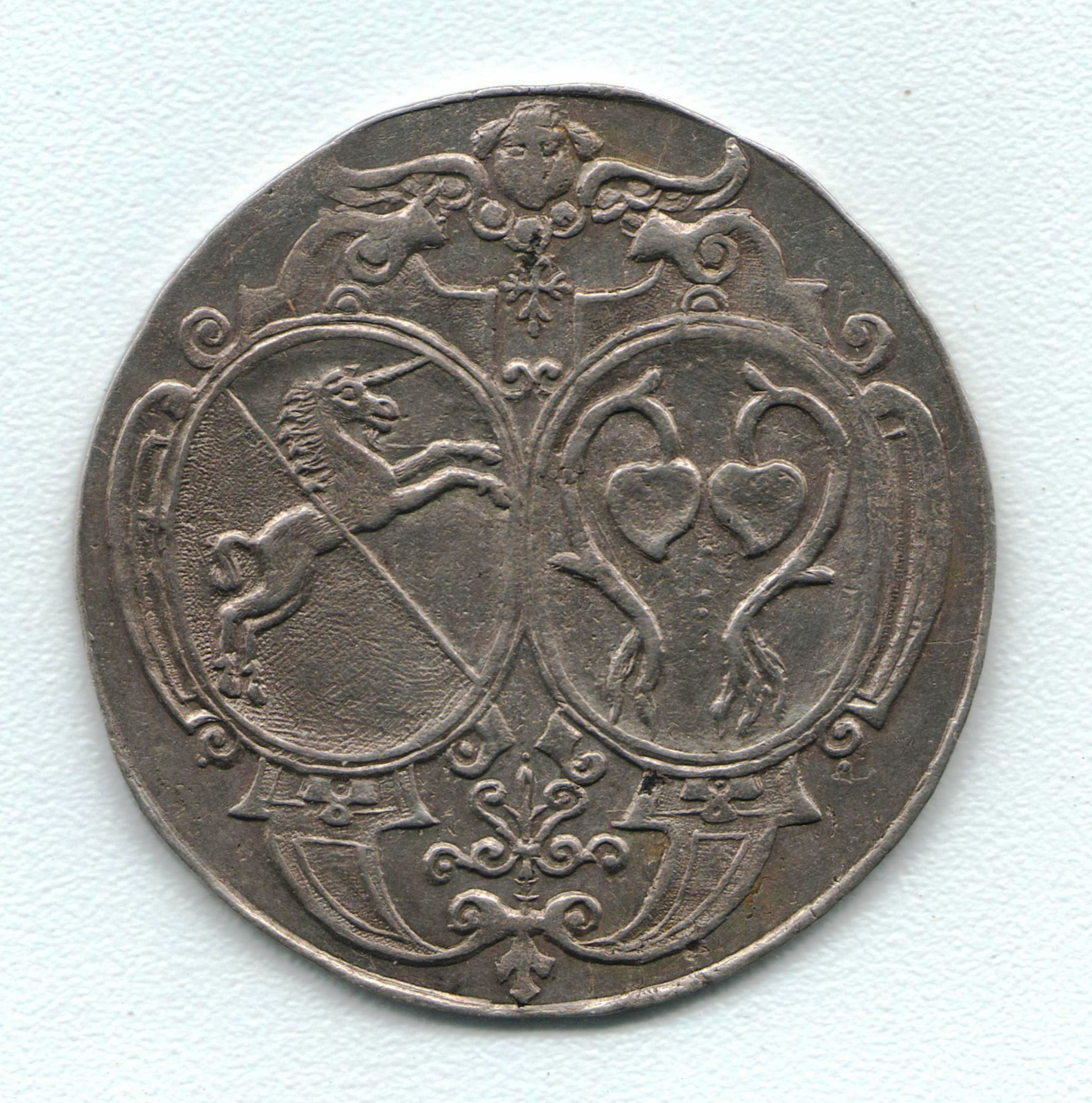
Coat of arms of the Talmberk family on coin

Two silver water lilies on a shield of red, each with a large leaf bent inwards towards one another. Helmet with silver and red mantling with red vol.

== Notable members ==
- Hroznata of Úžice, brother-in-law of Záviš of Falkenstein, founder of the Talmberk family
  - Vilém of Talmberk, son or nephew of Hroznata of Úžice, the first member of the family by name
  - Arnošt of Talmberk, son of Hroznata of Úžice, founder of the Černčičtí of Kácova family
- Diviš of Talmberk (died 1415), burgrave of Prague Castle
  - Oldřich of Talmberk, son of Diviš of Talmberk, inherited Talmberk in 1415 after his father's death
- Pavel of Miličín and Talmberk (died 2 May 1450), bishop of the Roman Catholic Archdiocese of Olomouc
- Pavel Pouček of Talmberk (before 1460–1498), Czech nobleman, priest, and member of the Canons Regular of the Holy Sepulchre
- Bedřich of Talmberk (mid-16th century – 13 October 1643), Czech politician and High Steward of the Czech Kingdom
- Jan František Kryštof of Talmberk (German: Johann Franz Christoph Freiherr von Talmberg, 31 December 1644 – 3 April 1698), bishop of the Roman Catholic Diocese of Hradec Králové
- Rudolf Franz Ferdinand von Talmberg (c. 1645–1702), artist, chamberlain, and cavalry captain in the court of Leopold I, Holy Roman Emperor
