= Divišov =

- Market town
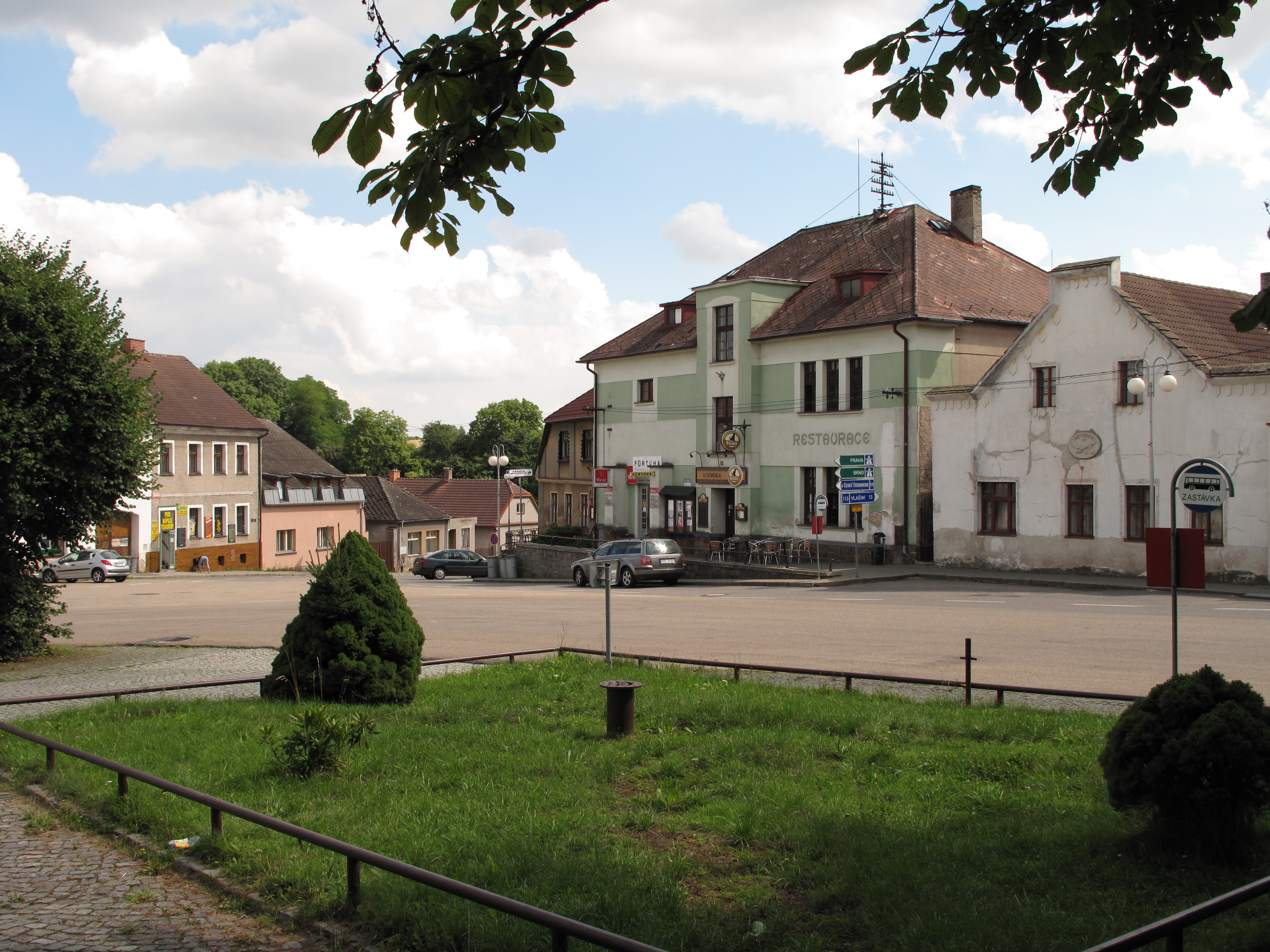
- The square Tyršovo náměstí

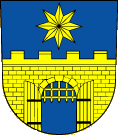
- Coat of arms

- Location in the Czech Republic
- Coordinates: 49°47′21″N 14°52′42″E
- Country: Czech Republic
- Region: Central Bohemian
- District: Benešov
- First mentioned: 1218

Area
  - Total: 30.99 km^{2} (11.97 sq mi)
- Elevation: 466 m (1,529 ft)

Population (2026-01-01)
  - Total: 1,849
  - Density: 59.66/km^{2} (154.5/sq mi)
- Time zone: UTC+1 (CET)
  - Summer (DST): UTC+2 (CEST)
- Postal code: 257 26
- Website: www.divisov.cz

Divišov (Czech pronunciation: [ˈɟɪvɪʃof]; German: Diwischau) is a market town in Benešov District in the Central Bohemian Region of the Czech Republic. It has about 1,800 inhabitants. It is located near the Sázava and Blanice rivers. Divišov is known for a Jawa factory that produces speedway motorcycles.

== Administrative division ==
Divišov consists of eight municipal parts (in brackets population according to the 2021 census):

- Divišov (1,312)
- Dalovy (87)
- Křešice (27)
- Lbosín (76)
- Měchnov (61)
- Radonice (42)
- Šternov (70)
- Zdebuzeves (50)

Radonice and Zdebuzeves form an exclave of the municipal territory.

== Etymology ==
The name is derived from the personal name Diviš, which is a Czech variant of the name Dionysus.

== Geography ==
Divišov is located about 13 kilometres (8 mi) east of Benešov and 39 km (24 mi) southeast of Prague. It is located in a hilly landscape. The western part of the municipal territory lies in the Benešov Uplands and the eastern part in the Vlašim Uplands. Large part of the area is covered with forests. The highest points are the hills Březák and Vrchy, both at 533 m (1,749 ft) above sea level.

The confluence of the rivers Sázava and Blanice is located in Radonice part of Divišov.

== History ==
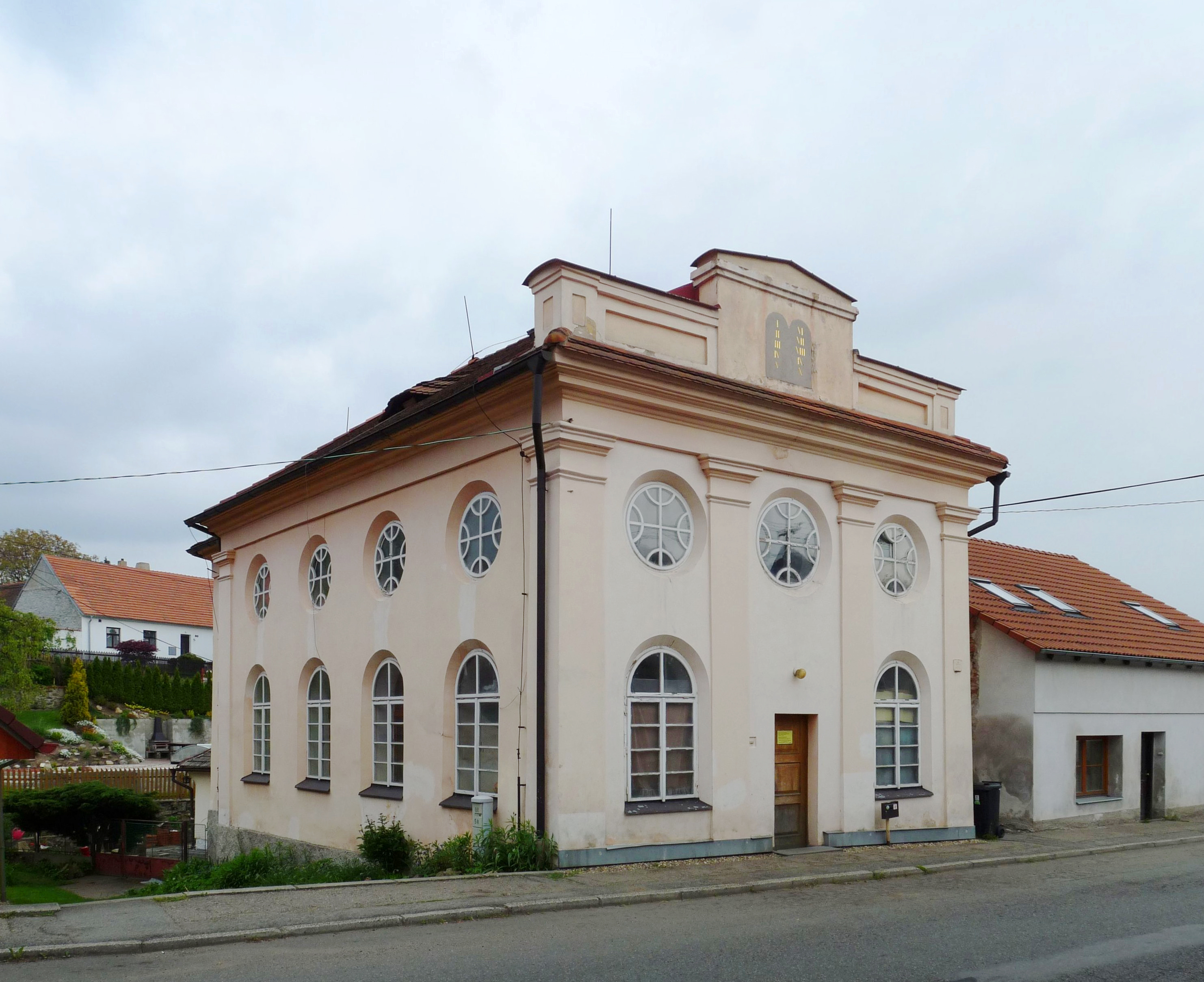
Synagogue

The first written mention of Divišov is in a deed of King Ottokar I of Bohemia from 1218, which included the name Diviš of Divišov. He founded here a fortress around which the settlement began to form. Before 1242, Zdislav, the first-born son of Diviš of Divišov, founded Český Šternberk Castle in the neighbourhood of today's Divišov municipal territory, and the Divišov family became known as the Sternberg (Šternberk) family.

In 1545, Divišov became a town. It received coat of arms with a gold star which reminded the Lords of Sternberg. In 1742, after a large fire, almost the whole of Divišov burned down.

In the last third of the 19th century and the beginning of the 20th century, development of industry occurred. After Divišov lost its town status around 1960, it became a market town in 2006.

=== Jewish community ===
The first Jews allegedly settled in Divišov before 1685. The first mention of the presence of the Jewish population is from 1718. The Jewish community was established on 1 August 1776, and immediately after its establishment, it applied for the lease of land for the establishment of a cemetery, which was founded in 1777. The cemetery was used until World War II.

== Demographics ==
Historical population

Year	Pop.	±%
1869	3,278	—
1880	3,199	−2.4%
1890	3,003	−6.1%
1900	2,943	−2.0%
1910	2,673	−9.2%

Year	Pop.	±%
1921	2,384	−10.8%
1930	2,096	−12.1%
1950	1,685	−19.6%
1961	1,700	+0.9%
1970	1,549	−8.9%

Year	Pop.	±%
1980	1,451	−6.3%
1991	1,325	−8.7%
2001	1,307	−1.4%
2011	1,540	+17.8%
2021	1,725	+12.0%

Source: Censuses

== Economy ==
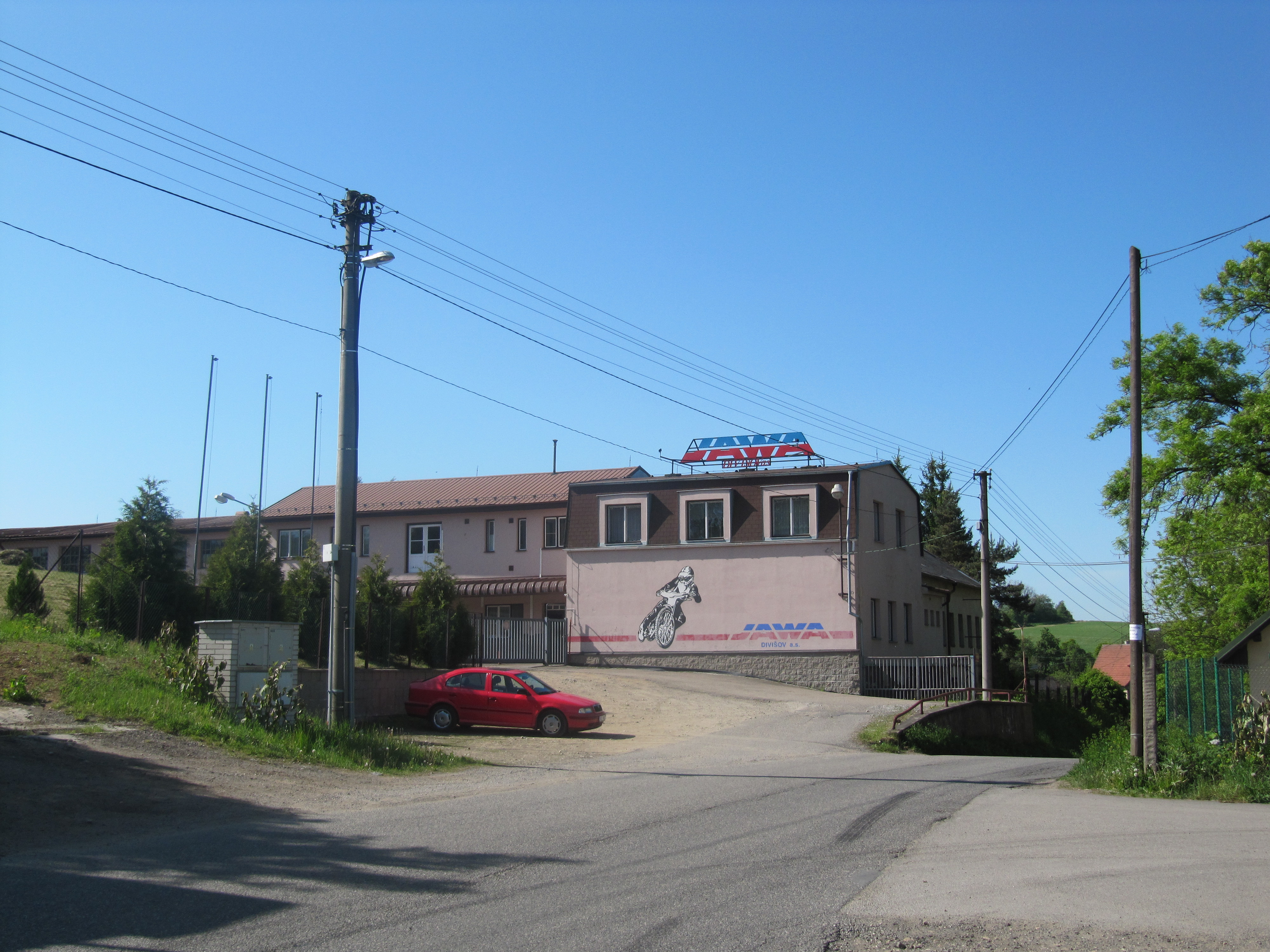
Jawa factory

In 1870, a factory for the production and processing of velvet was established here, and its products was appreciated even abroad. In 1948, Jaroslav Simandl founded a factory for speedway motorcycles of the Jawa brand.

== Transport ==
The D1 motorway from Prague to Brno runs through the northern part of the territory.

== Sport ==
There is a motorcycle speedway stadium in Divišov. It was opened in 1955 and hosts international races every year.

== Sights ==
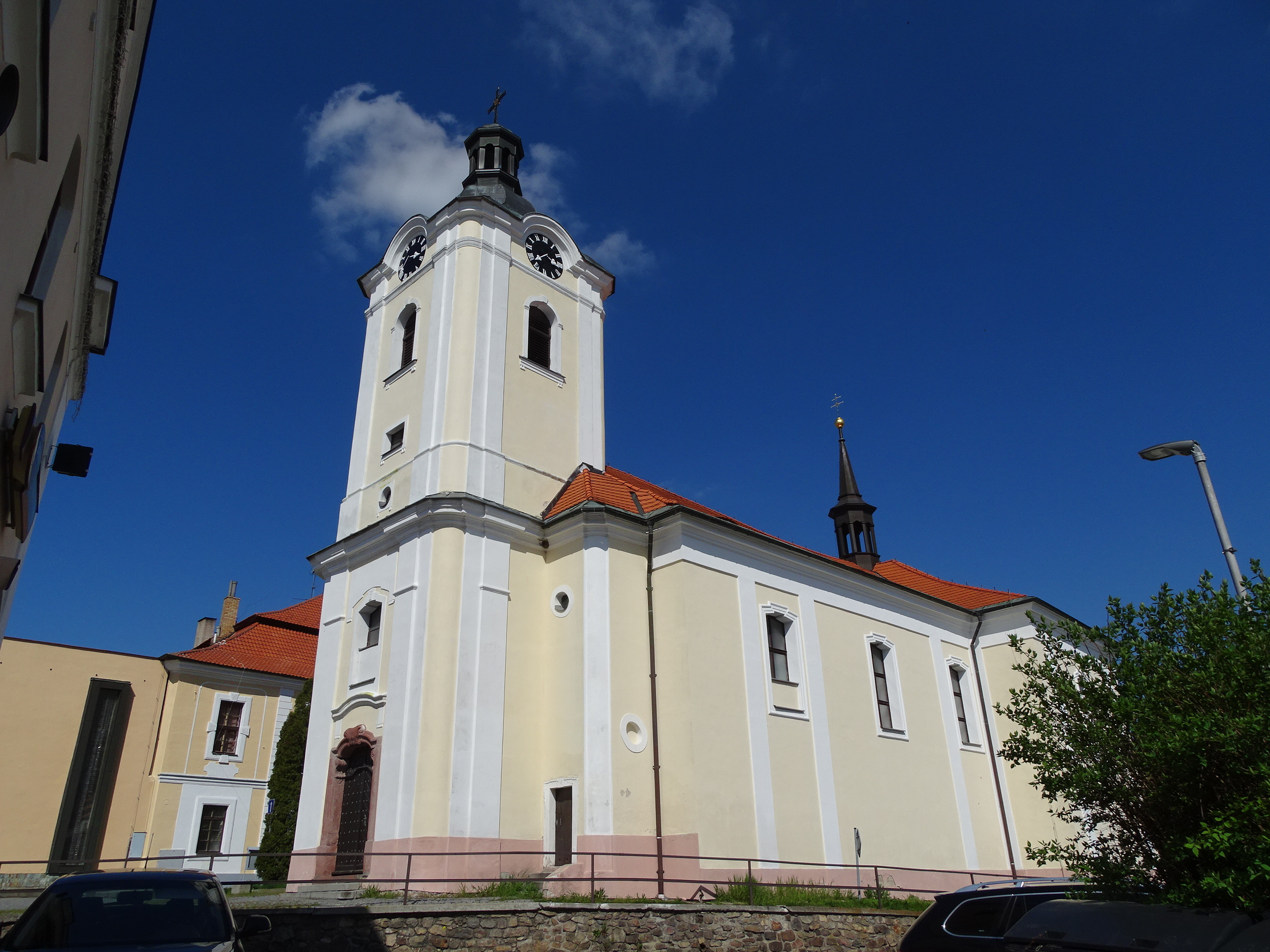
Church of Saint Bartholomew

The main landmark of Divišov is the Church of Saint Bartholomew. It was built in the Baroque style in 1744–1746 and has a rich Baroque decoration.

The synagogue was built at the beginning of the 19th century. In 1854–1856, it was rebuilt to the Neoclassical style. After the building was used as a warehouse and hairdressing salon during the 20th century, it was returned to Jewish community of Prague in 1995. Since 2004, it serves as the Museum of the Life of the Jewish Community of Divišov.

The Jewish cemetery has an area of 2,921 square metres (31,440 sq ft). About 200 tombstones of the Baroque and Neoclassical type have been preserved, the oldest legible from the end of the 18th century. It is protected as a cultural monument and is gradually renovated.

The Church of Saint Martin is located in Měchnov. It is a Romanesque church from the first half of the 13th century. The tower was added probably around 1300. The church was later modified in the Gothic and Baroque styles, but retained its Romanesque character.

The Church of Saint Anne is located in Zdebuzeves. It was built in 1836, when it replaced an old Gothic church dedicated to Saints Simon and Jude.
