= Eliška Bláhová =

Eliška Bláhová (4 February 1884 – 1 July 1966) was a Czech dance educator.

== Biography ==
Eliška Bláhová, née Alžběta Sedláčková, was a Czech dancer, educator, and co-founder of the Society of State-Examined Rhythmic Gymnastics Teachers. She was born on 4 February 1884 in Nymburk. She later moved to Prague after the death of her father.

She studied with Émile Jaques-Dalcroze in Geneva in 1925.

She wrote several books in Czech about dance education, methodology, and theory, including Pohyb, rytmus, výraz ('Movement, rhythm, expression'), Tělesná výchova rytmikou dětí školních a předškolních ('Rhythmic physical education for school children and preschoolers'), and Verše a říkadla pro rytmický výcvik dětí ('Verses and rhymes for rhythmic training of children').

One of Bláhová's students, Elmarita Divíšková, went on to become a dance educator as well.
