= Šternov =

- Village
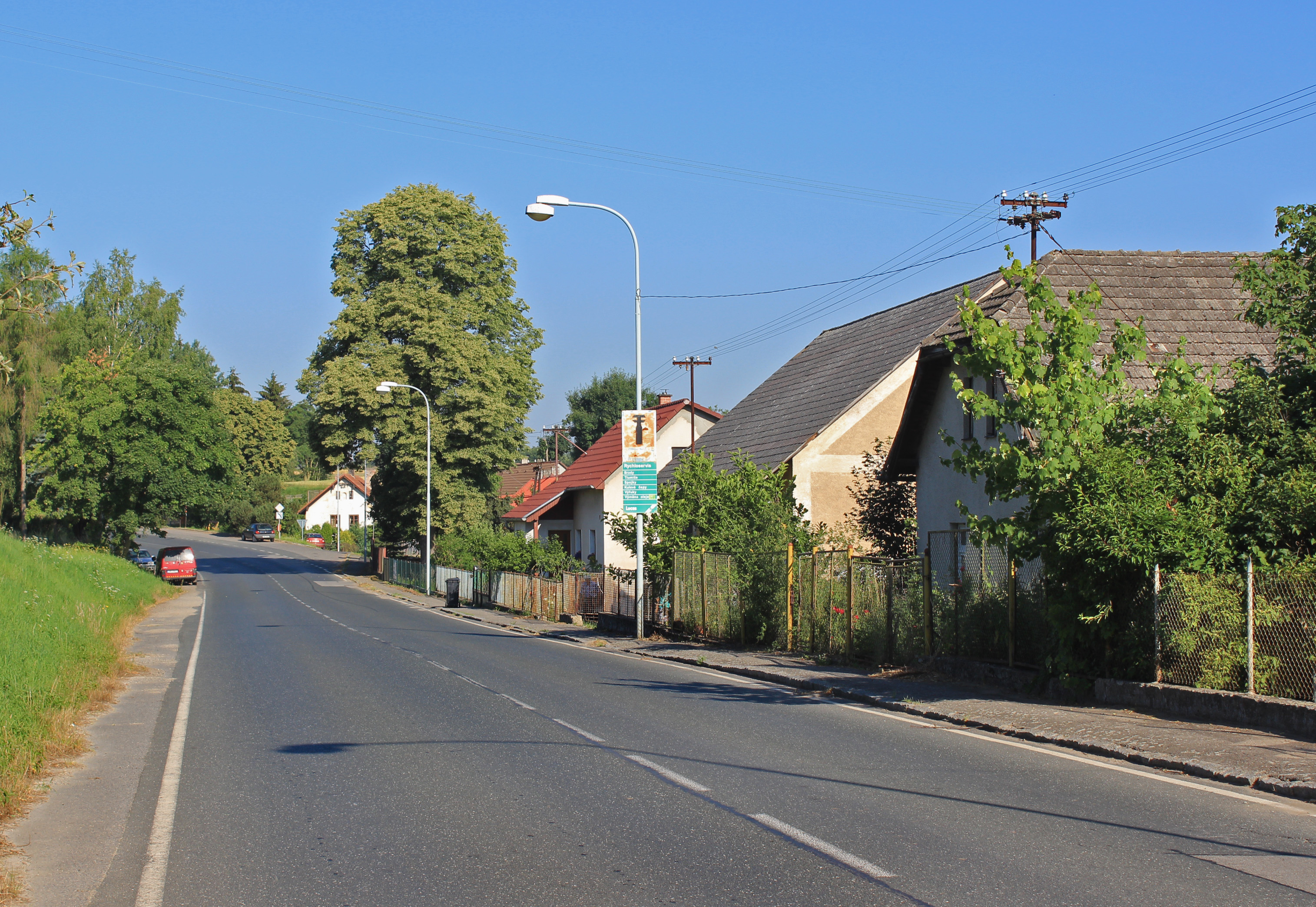
- Main road

- Location in the Czech Republic
- Coordinates: 49°48′14″N 14°54′38″E
- Country: Czech Republic
- Region: Central Bohemian
- District: Benešov
- Municipality: Divišov
- First mentioned: 1413

Area
  - Total: 1.87 km^{2} (0.72 sq mi)
- Elevation: 423 m (1,388 ft)

Population (2021)
  - Total: 70
  - Density: 37/km^{2} (97/sq mi)
- Time zone: UTC+1 (CET)
  - Summer (DST): UTC+2 (CEST)
- Postal code: 257 26

Šternov is a village and municipal part of Divišov in Benešov District in the Central Bohemian Region of the Czech Republic. It has about 70 inhabitants.

== Demographics ==
Historical population
Year	Pop.	±%
1869	162	—
1880	166	+2.5%
1890	130	−21.7%
1900	154	+18.5%
1910	160	+3.9%
1921	140	−12.5%
1930	152	+8.6%
1950	96	−36.8%
1961	118	+22.9%
1970	110	−6.8%
1980	93	−15.5%
1991	92	−1.1%
2001	76	−17.4%
2011	54	−28.9%
2021	70	+29.6%
Source: Censuses
