= Divis (surname) =

Divis is a surname. It is an anglicised and germanised version of the Czech surname Diviš. Notable people with the surname include:

- Reinhard Divis (born 1975), Austrian ice hockey player
- Moxie Divis (1894–1955), American baseball outfielder
- Tania (tango singer), stage name of Ana Luciano Divis (1908–1999), Spanish tango singer

== See also ==
- Davis (surname)
