= Elmarita Divíšková =

Elmarita Divíšková (21 October 1910 – 20 May 2003) was a Czech dancer and dance educator.

== Biography ==
Elmarita Divíšková (née Oehlová) was born on 21 October 1910 in Brno. She studied at Eliška Bláhová's school, which taught movement classes, and also took classes with Jarmila Kröschlová.

Divíšková opened her own school, Škola pohybové výchovy a uměleckého tance ('School of Movement Education and Artistic Dance'), in Brno's Černá Pole district.

Her daughter, Nina Divíšková, was an actress.
