= Vilém of Talmberk and Miličín =

Moravian noble

- Burgrave of Prague
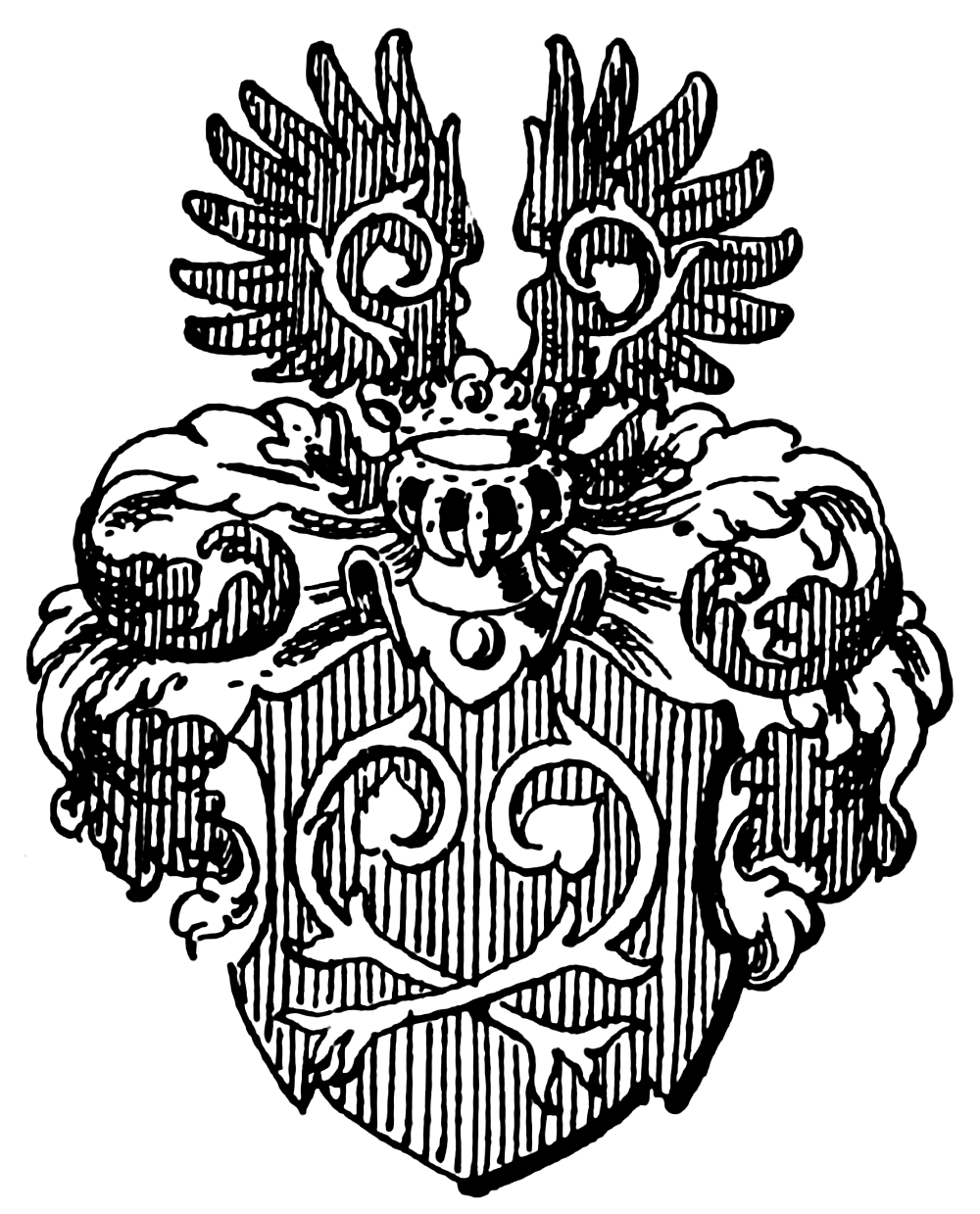
- Coat of arms
- Noble family: Talmberk family

Vilém of Talmberk and Miličín was a Moravian nobleman, an associate of the regional court, and first documented member of the Talmberk family.

== Biography ==
Vilém was closely related to Hroznata of Úžice, possibly his nephew. He was first mentioned in 1297. He later acquired the lands of Miličín. Some historians, such as Marek Rubeš, cite Vilém as the founder of Talmberk Castle. Vilém was not part of the resistance against the king that other members of his family joined, and did not have his property confiscated in 1291.

Vilém had two sons, Diviš and Nezamysl, who were mentioned in 1316 and 1336.
