= Havel Medek of Valdek =

Bohemian noble

- Lord of Talmberk
- Native name: Havel Medek z Valdeka
- Other names: Havel Medek of Talmberk
- Died: 1410

Havel Medek of Valdek (Czech: Havel Medek z Valdeka; died 1410) was a Bohemian noble. He was the son of Oldřich Medek of Valdek, the lord of Týnec nad Sázavou. Havel is mentioned as residing in Týnec in 1349. In 1390, Havel besieged Talmberk Castle, conquering it and capturing the lord Diviš of Talmberk. Havel then began styling himself as Medek of Talmberk.

Diviš was imprisoned for seven years before the provincial courts declared Havel's seizure illegal. Havel was summoned to court in Prague but did not attend. Diviš was subsequently released and Havel returned the castle.

== In popular culture ==
Havel is referenced in the 2018 video game Kingdom Come: Deliverance. Before the events of the game, he is mentioned as being the captor of Lord Divish (a character based on Diviš) and as burning down the village of Pribyslavitz (Přibyslavice).
