= Mrchojedy =

- Village
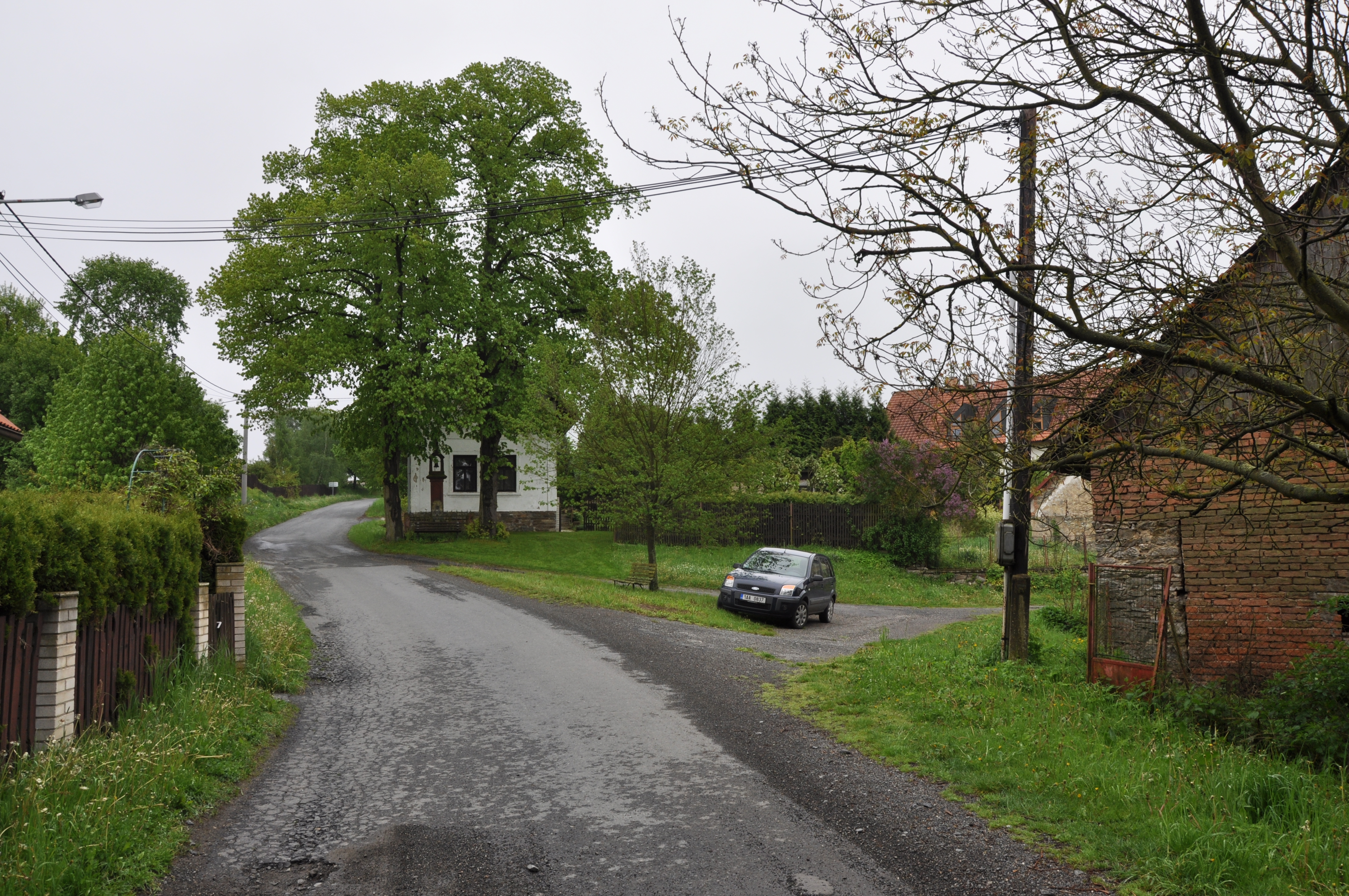
- Centre of Mrchojedy

- Location in the Czech Republic
- Coordinates: 49°51′58″N 14°56′30″E
- Country: Czech Republic
- Region: Central Bohemian
- District: Kutná Hora
- Municipality: Samopše
- First mentioned: 1316

Area
  - Total: 0.98 km^{2} (0.38 sq mi)
- Elevation: 408 m (1,339 ft)

Population (2021)
  - Total: 6
  - Density: 6.1/km^{2} (16/sq mi)
- Time zone: UTC+1 (CET)
  - Summer (DST): UTC+2 (CEST)
- Postal code: 285 07

Mrchojedy (German: Merchojed) is a village and administrative part of Samopše in Kutná Hora District in the Central Bohemian Region of the Czech Republic. It has 6 inhabitants.

== History ==
The first written record of Mrchojedy is from 1316. The village was owned by Sázava Monastery. It was acquired by the Waldstein family in the 16th century, but in the 17th century, it has returned to the ownership of the Sázava Monastery. The monastery owned it until 1785, when it was abolished by decree of Emperor Joseph II.

== In popular culture ==
A 15th century recreation of the village, called Merhojed, is featured in the video game Kingdom Come: Deliverance.
