= Diviš of Talmberk =

Bohemian noble

- Lord of Talmberk; Burgrave of Prague Castle
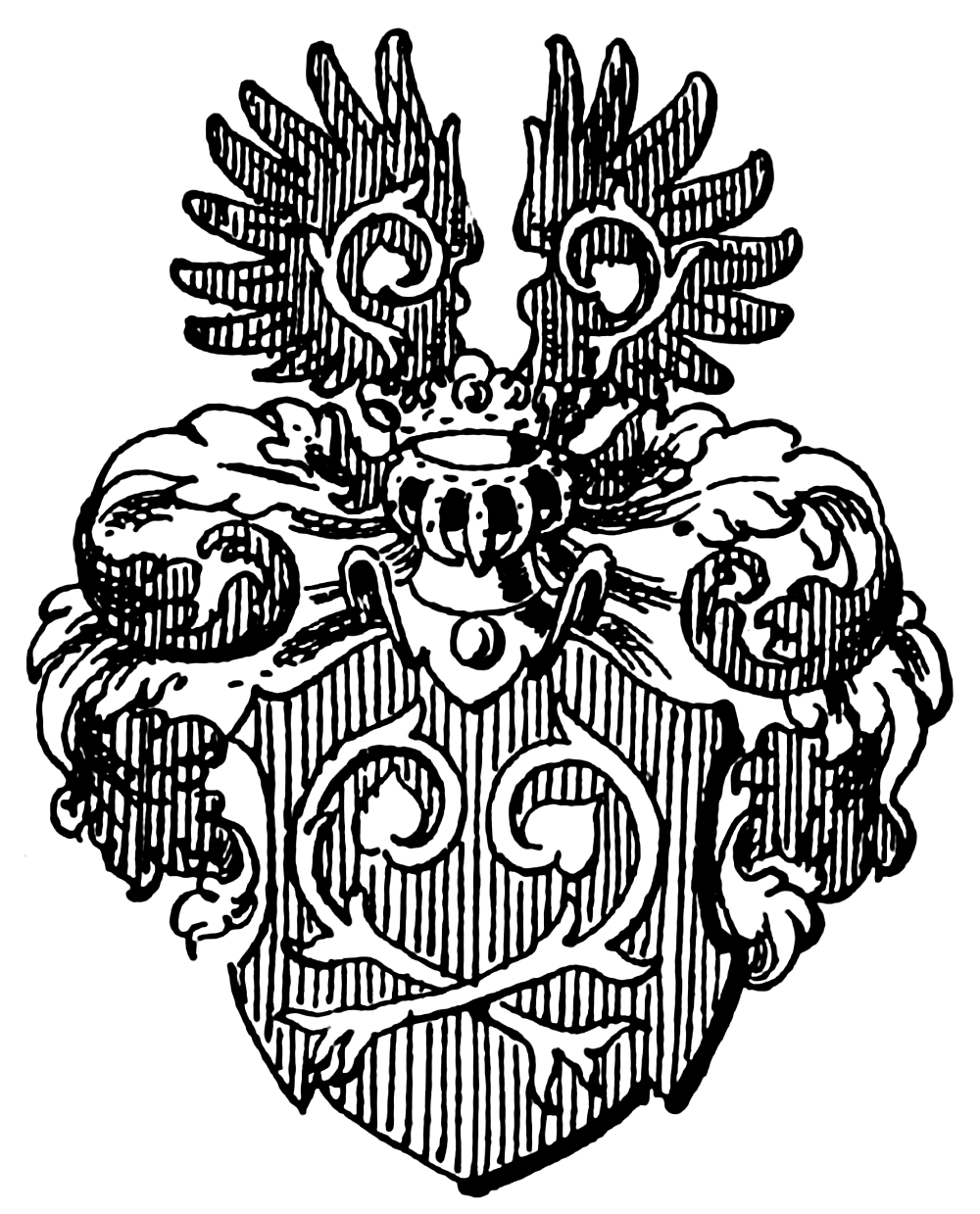
- Coat of arms
- Died: 1415
- Noble family: Talmberk family

Diviš of Talmberk (died 1415) was a Bohemian noble and lord of Talmberk. He served as burgrave of Prague Castle under Wenceslaus IV at the turn of the 15th century.

== Biography ==
In 1390, Diviš gained control of Talmberk Castle. The castle was soon after besieged by Havel Medek of Valdek, who conquered Talmberk and captured Diviš. Diviš was imprisoned for seven years before the provincial courts as burgrave of Prague Castle declared Havel's seizure illegal, and Diviš was able to ransom himself and reclaim the castle. In 1401, he moved to Prague as burgrave of Prague Castle. Diviš died sometime in 1415. His son, Oldřich of Talmberk, succeeded him as Lord of Talmberk.

Some sources conflate Diviš of Talmberk (died 1415) with Diviš from Talmberk and Miličín (1352–1413). The latter served as burgrave in the service of the Rosenberg family, whereas Diviš of Talmberk was in the service of Wenceslaus IV. These were likely two different people.

== In popular culture ==
Sir Divish of Talmberg, a character in the 2018 video game Kingdom Come: Deliverance, is based on Diviš. In the game, he leads the pro-Wenceslaus faction alongside Radzig Kobyla. He is referenced in Kingdom Come: Deliverance II.
