= Tamara Divíšková =

Czech ceramist and costume designer

Tamara Divíšková (born 9 July 1934, in Brno) is a Czech ceramist and costume designer. During her career, she has collaborated with the National Theatre in Brno, among other institutions. She is the sister of the actress Nina Divíšková.
