= Richard Diviš =

Czech ice hockey player

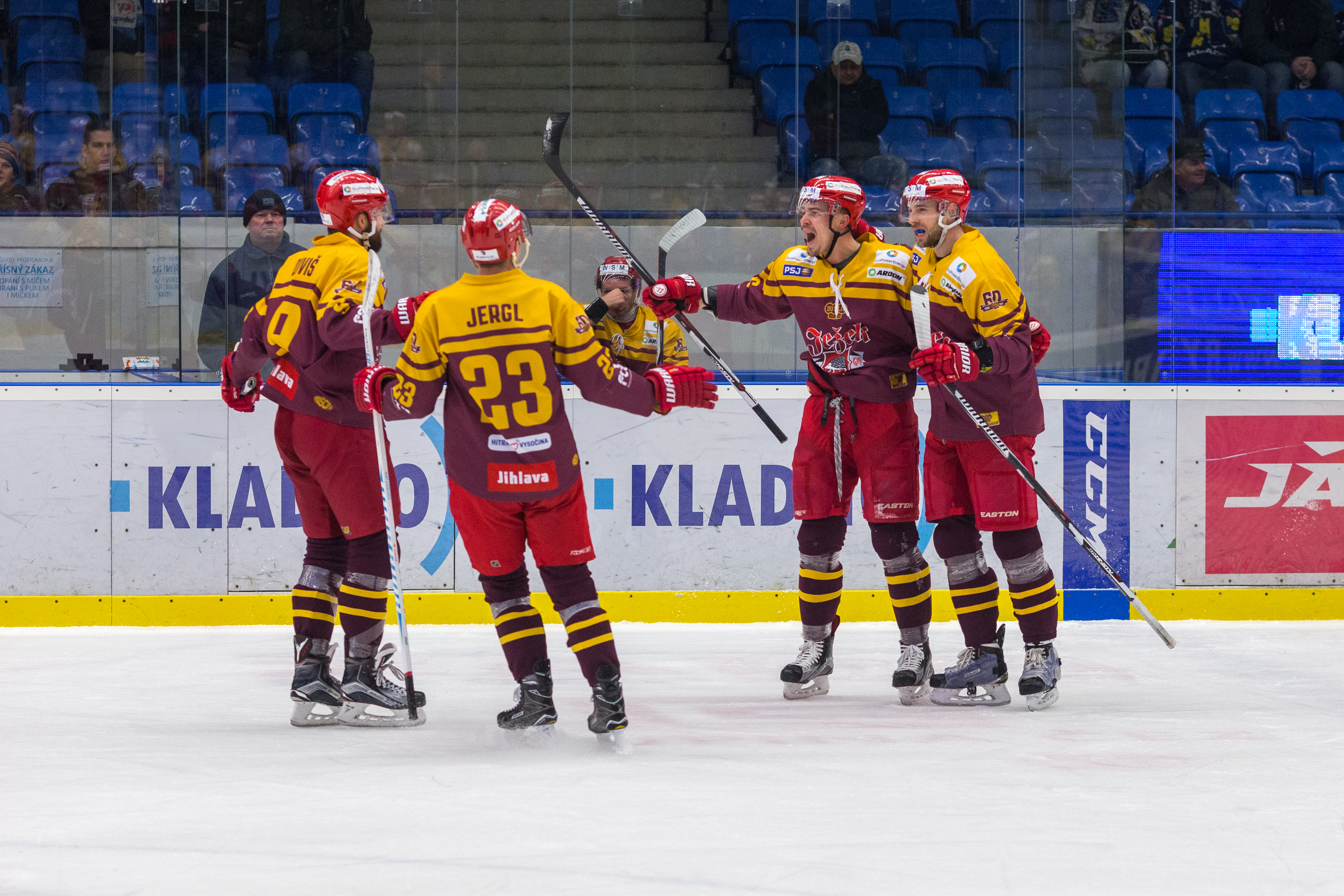
- Richard Diviš, pictured as the furthest on the left
- Born: 5 June 1985 (age 41) Trutnov, Czechoslovakia
- Height: 6 ft 1 in (185 cm)
- Weight: 187 lb (85 kg; 13 st 5 lb)
- Position: Forward
- Shoots: Right
- Czech Extraliga team: HC Plzeň
- NHL draft: Undrafted
- Playing career: 2005–present

Richard Diviš (born 5 June 1985 in Trutnov) is a Czech professional ice hockey player. He played with HC Plzeň in the Czech Extraliga during the 2010–11 season.

Diviš previously played for HC Kladno, HC VČE Hradec Králové, HC Berounští Medvědi and HC Slovan Ústečtí Lvi.
