= Hroznata of Úžice =

Moravian noble

- Burgrave of Prague
- Coat of arms
- Noble family: Kounice family

Hroznata of Úžice was a Moravian nobleman, Highest Burgrave of the Kingdom of Bohemia between 1284 and 1286, and the founder of the Talmberk family.

== Biography ==
Hroznata was in the service of King Wenceslas II, for which he was granted land north of the Sázava River around Úžice. Talmberk Castle was built here. The castle was first indirectly documented in 1297 through the name of Vilém of Talmberk, a son or nephew of Hroznata.

Hroznata was brother-in-law of Záviš of Falkenstein. He had several sons, including Heřman, Arnošt, Jan, and Budivoj. Arnošt took on the family name of Talmberk, and founded the Černčičtí of Kácova family. After a dispute with Bishop Tobiáš of Bechyně in support of Záviš, Hroznata and his sons were declared outlaws and much of their property was confiscated. Vilém was not part of the conflict and avoided punishment.

== Coat of arms ==
The wax seal of Hroznata of Úžice, attached to a deed dated 24 May 1284, contains the two water lilies of the Kounice family.
