= Nina Divíšková =

Czech actress (1936–2021)

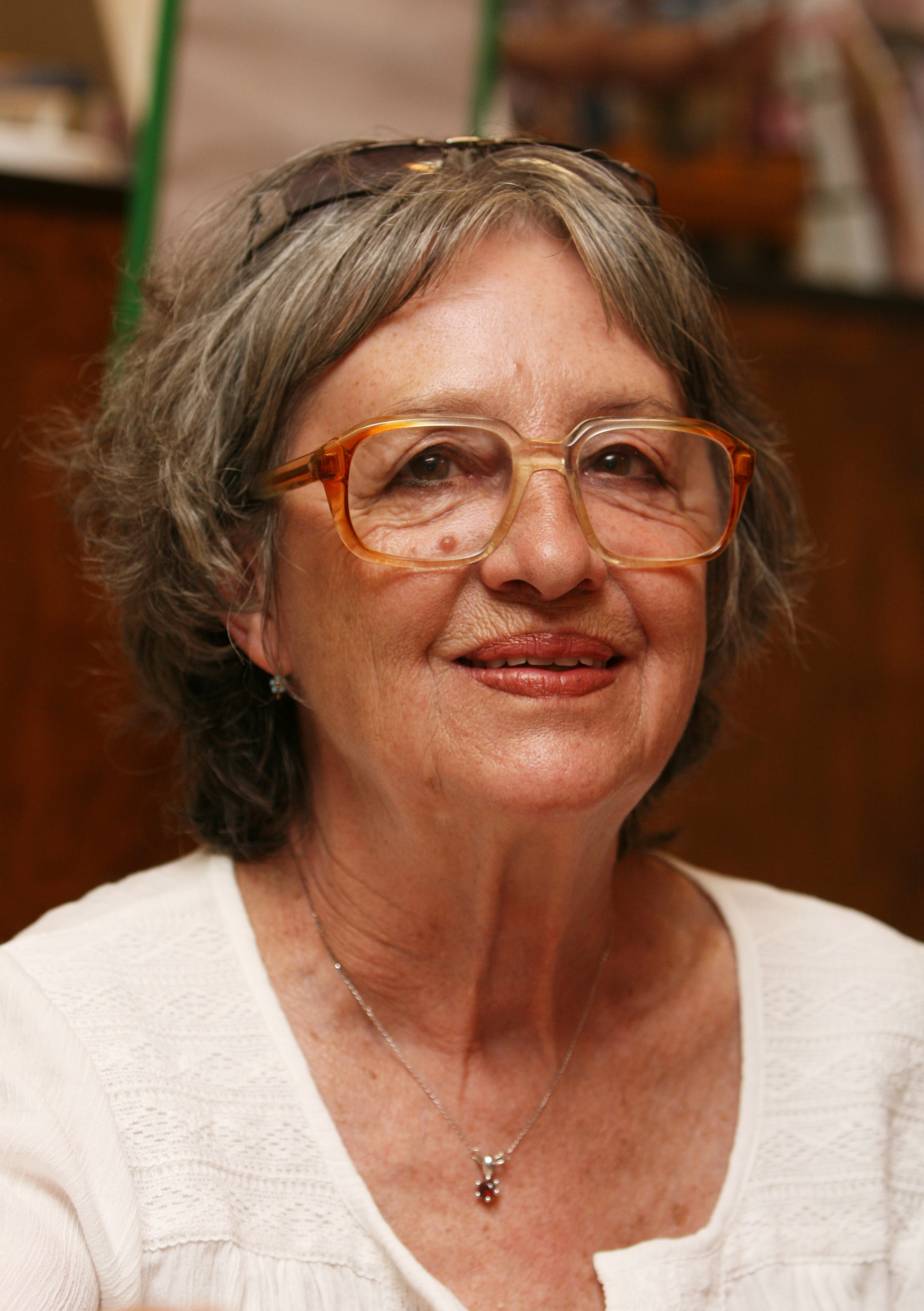
- Divíšková in 2008
- Born: 12 July 1936; Brno, Czechoslovakia
- Died: 21 June 2021 (aged 84); Prague, Czech Republic
- Occupation: Actress
- Years active: 1967–2010s
- Relatives: Tamara Divíšková (sister)

Nina Divíšková (12 July 1936 – 21 June 2021) was a Czech actress. She appeared in more than seventy films since 1967. She was the wife of the film director Jan Kačer. Her sister is ceramist Tamara Divíšková.

== Selected filmography ==
Year	Title	Role	Notes
1967	The Smooth Career	Vera	
1972	Morgiana	Otýlie	
1982	Rendezvous in Paris	Governess	
1983	Jára Cimrman Lying, Sleeping	Holubová	
1987	Wolf's Hole	Jan's mother	
2000	Wild Flowers	Stepmother (section The Golden Spinning Wheel)	
2005	Wrong Side Up	Petr's mother	
2008	Shameless	Marta	
2011	The Magical Duvet	Hilda	
