= Talmberk Castle =

13th-century castle in the Czech Republic

Coordinates: 49°52′02″N 14°57′21″E

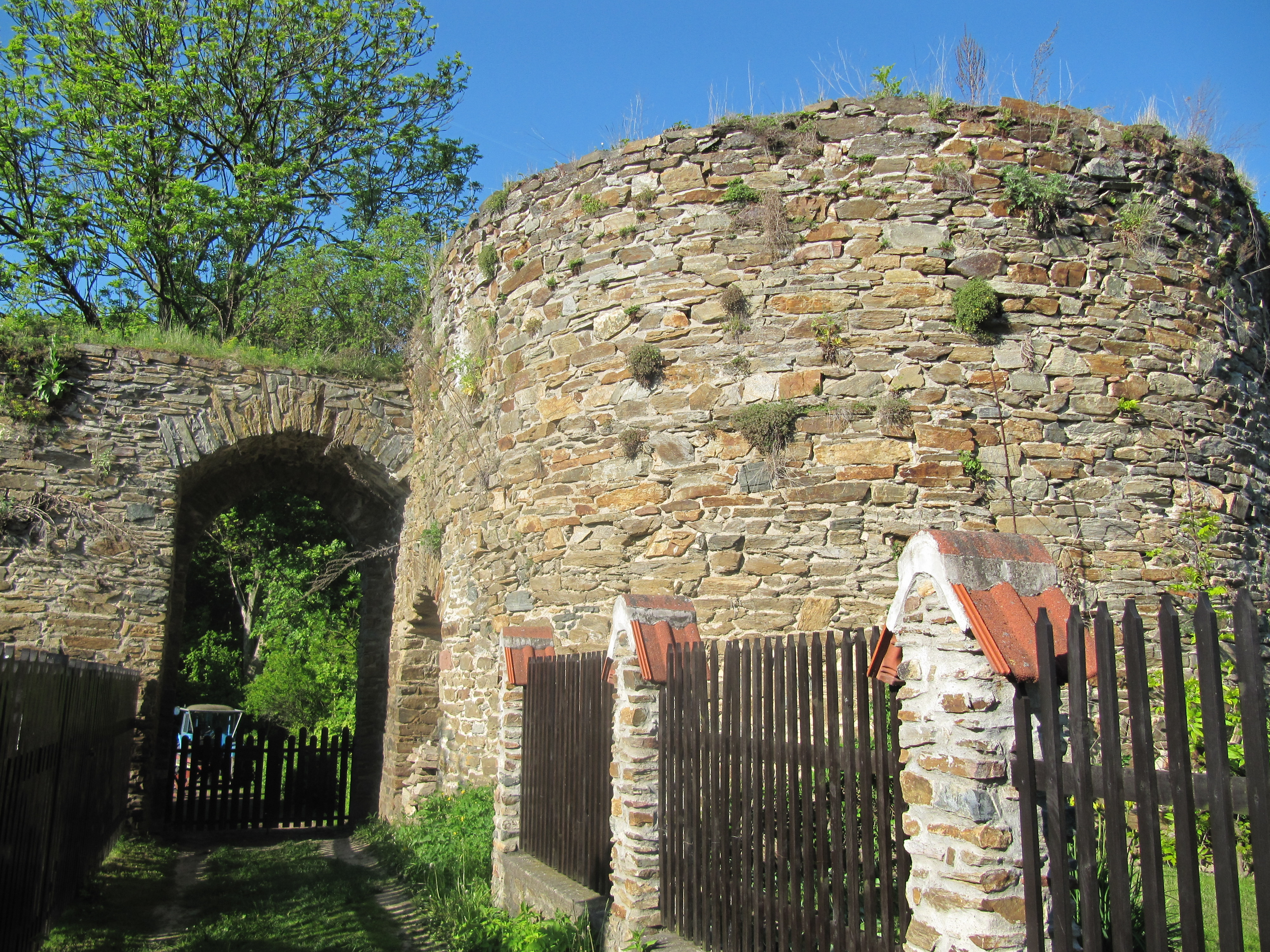
Remnants of the castle

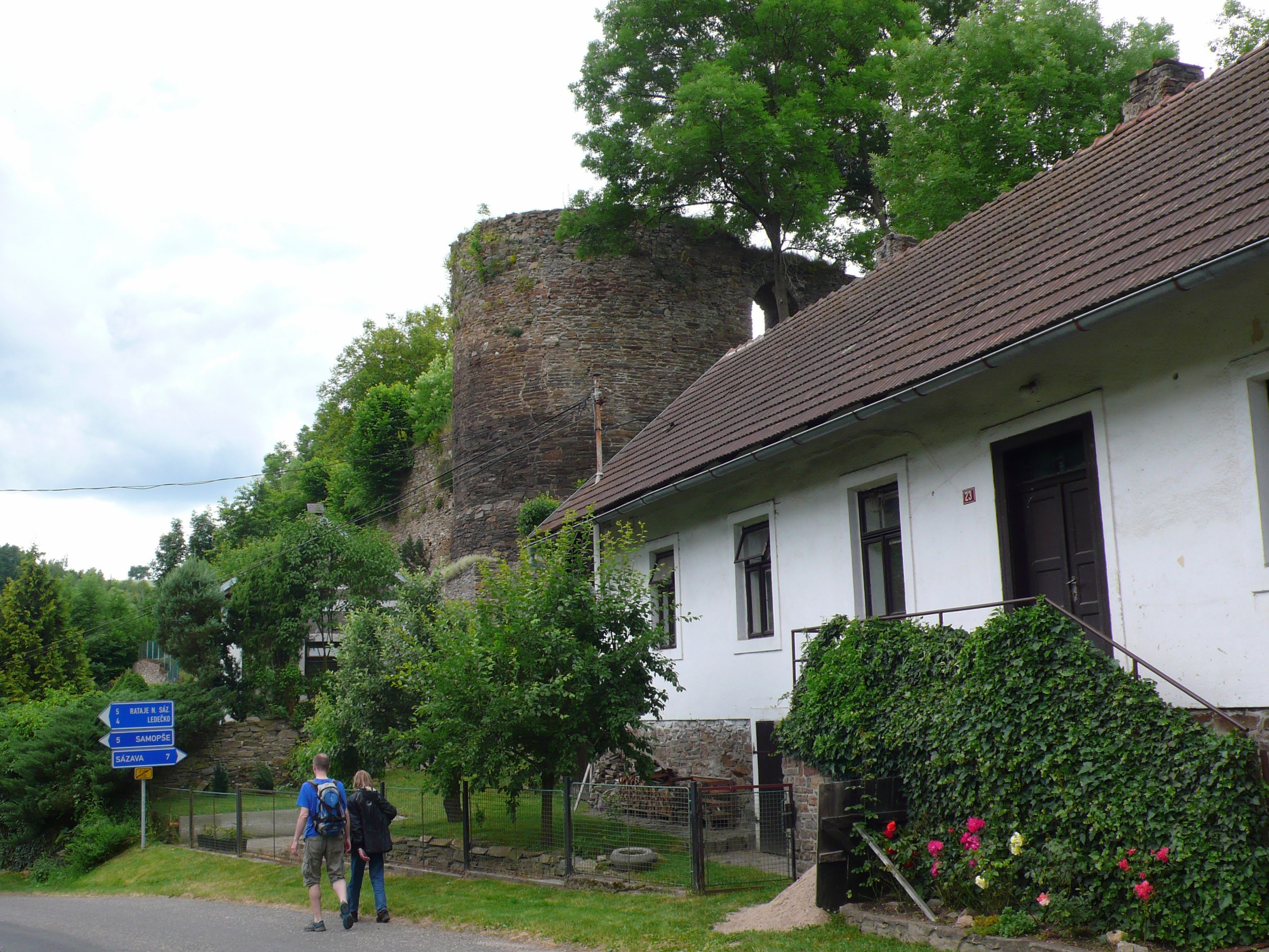
Bergfried of Talmberk

Talmberk Castle is a castle ruin in Talmberk in the Central Bohemian Region of the Czech Republic. It was built around 1297 and abandoned by 1533. Talmberk Castle's current state is in ruins, though the lower portion of the original bergfried still remains today. The ruins are a protected cultural monument since 1958.

== History ==
The land was granted to Hroznata of Úžice due to his service to King Wenceslaus II of Bohemia. In the late 14th century, Talmberk Castle was occupied by Diviš of Talmberk and was besieged in 1390 and held by Havel Medek of Valdek.

== In popular culture ==
The castle's 1403 recreation was featured in the Czech role-playing video-game Kingdom Come: Deliverance.
