= Yezdi =

Indian motorcycle brand

- Product type: Motorcycles
- Produced by: Classic Legends
- Country: India
- Introduced: early 1970s, revived 2022
- Related brands: Jawa, BSA Motorcycles
- Markets: India
- Tagline: Born Out Of Line (since 2025); Forever Bike, Forever Value (till 1996)
- Website: Official website

Yezdi is an Indian motorcycle brand. It was established in the early 1970s by Ideal Jawa, a Mysore-based manufacturer that had previously built Jawa motorcycles under licence from the Czechoslovak company of that name, and was used on motorcycles produced in India until Ideal Jawa ceased manufacturing in 1996. The brand was revived in January 2022 by Classic Legends, a subsidiary of Mahindra & Mahindra, which launched three new models under the name, the Roadster, the Scrambler and the Adventure.

Yezdi motorcycles such as the Roadking, Monarch and Classic were popular in India during the 1970s and 1980s. They continue to have a following among motorcycle enthusiasts.

== History ==
=== Under Ideal Jawa ===
Yezdi was started by Ideal Jawa (India) Ltd , a company founded by the brothers Rustom and Farrokh Irani, who began assembling Czechoslovak-designed Jawa motorcycles under licence at a factory in Mysore that came into operation in 1961. The plant was established with the support of the Wadiyar royal family of Mysore.

The licensing arrangement with the Czechoslovak manufacturer came to an end as Cold War-era export restrictions made continued collaboration difficult, and Ideal Jawa subsequently began marketing motorcycles developed in India under the Yezdi name. (Note: Published accounts differ on the exact year the Yezdi name was adopted: ThePrint gives 1971, Bike India gives 1974, and Business Standard places the end of the Czechoslovak collaboration in 1968.) The name Yezdi derives from ancient Persia and was used for people from the Yazd province.

Production models of this period included the Roadking, Oilking, Monarch and Classic, of which the Yezdi Roadking became the best known. At the height of demand, the company was producing 130 motorcycles a day, and the Yezdi was more popular than the contemporary Bullet and Rajdoot.

The company also exported Yezdi motorcycles to more than 60 countries.

The arrival of Japanese manufacturers in the Indian market from the 1980s, offering lighter and more fuel-efficient four-stroke machines, eroded the company's position. Tightening emission standards rendered its two-stroke engines unviable, and production ended in 1996. Rights to the Jawa name reverted to the Czech company. Ideal Jawa entered liquidation, and the Mysore factory was closed permanently in 2002. No motorcycles were produced under the Yezdi name between 1996 and 2022.

=== Revival under Classic Legends ===
Classic Legends was founded in 2015 by Anupam Thareja and Boman Irani, the son of Rustom Irani, in partnership with Mahindra & Mahindra. The company acquired rights to the Jawa brand in 2016 and relaunched it in India in 2018.

On 13 January 2022, Classic Legends revived the Yezdi name with three models, the Roadster, the Scrambler and the Adventure. All three used a 334 cc single-cylinder liquid-cooled engine in differing states of tune, and were sold through the dealer network already established for Jawa motorcycles.

Yezdi motorcycles are assembled at Classic Legends' plant at Pithampur in Madhya Pradesh, which also builds the company's Jawa and BSA models. In 2026, Yezdi was described as one of the fastest-growing brands in India's 350 cc-and-above motorcycle segment.

== Models ==
Before production ended in 1996, Yezdi produced motorcycles in several engine capacities. Its models included the 250 cc Model B, Oilking, Roadking, Classic, Deluxe, CL II and Monarch, along with the 350 Twin, 175, Jet and Colt. The Roadking was introduced in 1978, while the 350 Twin was introduced in 1986. The company also produced smaller 60 cc models, including the Jet and Colt.

On 13 January 2022, Classic Legends relaunched the brand with three motorcycles, the Roadster, Scrambler and Adventure. All three initially used a 334 cc liquid-cooled, single-cylinder engine.

=== Yezdi Roadster ===
The Yezdi Roadster is a 334 cc motorcycle powered by a liquid-cooled, single-cylinder Alpha2 engine, paired with a six-speed gearbox. In August 2025, the model received a redesign that included a shorter rear fender, a redesigned tail-light and a number plate holder mounted on the swingarm. Other changes included a wider rear tyre, a strengthened frame, revised suspension settings and a seat that allows the pillion seat and grab rails to be removed. Factory customisation kits and accessories were also offered for the motorcycle.

In March 2026, the Roadster received a new Red Wolf colour scheme with red paintwork and chrome detailing. In July that year, a Green Mamba metallic finish was added to the model's colour options.

=== Yezdi Scrambler ===
The Yezdi Scrambler is a 334 cc motorcycle powered by a liquid-cooled, single-cylinder engine paired with a six-speed gearbox. In April 2026, the model received changes to its design, including a redesigned fuel tank, revised side panels and a ribbed seat. The twin-exhaust system was replaced with a single exhaust, reducing the motorcycle's weight by 8 kg to 174 kg. The updated engine produces 30 hp and 30 Nm of torque. Other additions included traction control, three riding modes and switchable ABS.

In July 2026, the Scrambler received a new Grey Panther colour scheme, with a metallic grey finish, an Arabica-brown ribbed seat and matching tank pads. The changes were mainly cosmetic.

=== Yezdi Adventure ===
The Yezdi Adventure is a 334 cc adventure-touring motorcycle powered by a liquid-cooled, single-cylinder engine. It has long-travel suspension, wire-spoke wheels and a digital instrument display with Bluetooth connectivity and turn-by-turn navigation.

In 2025, the model received changes to its bodywork, including an asymmetrical twin-headlight arrangement, twin-pod tail-lights and an adjustable windscreen. The engine retained its 334 cc capacity, but received changes to its fuel mapping and gear ratios. The updated model also features traction control and three ABS modes for road, rain and off-road riding.

In July 2026, optional factory-fitted tubeless cross-spoke wheels became available for the Adventure, allowing it to use tubeless tyres while retaining wire-spoke wheels.

== Trademark litigation ==
Rights to the Yezdi name have been contested between Classic Legends and the official liquidator of Ideal Jawa. In December 2022, a single judge of the Karnataka High Court ruled that the Yezdi trademarks belonged to Ideal Jawa's liquidation estate, invalidated registrations obtained by Boman Irani and ordered Classic Legends and Irani to stop using the name.

On 27 November 2025, a division bench of the High Court allowed appeals filed by Irani and Classic Legends and overturned the earlier ruling. It held that the relevant trademark registrations had lapsed and that Ideal Jawa's official liquidator had not taken adequate steps to protect them. The bench also found insufficient evidence that Ideal Jawa retained the goodwill associated with the trademarks after it ceased operations. In April 2026, the Supreme Court of India issued notice (returnable on 15 July 2026) on a challenge to the 2025 ruling filed by Ideal Jawa's official liquidator.

== Legacy ==
Yezdi motorcycles developed a cult following in India, with their sporty character, handling and ease of maintenance cited as factors in their appeal. They were also associated with motorcycle touring and recreational riding, while owners' clubs continued to preserve and ride the motorcycles after production ended in 1996. Yezdi motorcycles were ridden by racers Fariborz Irani, CK Chinnappa, Rustom Hormuzdji, B. S. Shinde and Thirumal Roy. Deepak Kamath and G. H. Basavaraj circumnavigated the world on a Yezdi Roadking.

Yezdi motorcycles appeared in the Hindi films Parvarish (1977), in which Amitabh Bachchan rode one, and Chashme Buddoor (1981), which featured Farooq Shaikh and Deepti Naval with a Yezdi motorcycle. The 2016 Malayalam comedy film Maanasaandarapetta Yezdi centred on a Yezdi motorcycle and a race between two rival mechanics.

The Bangalore Jawa Yezdi Motorcycle Club was formed in the 2000s and helps preserve the motorcycles and assists owners with parts and repairs. It had more than 1,600 members by 2016. The Yezdi and Jawa Owners' Club of India was established in 2002.

Jawa and Yezdi owners' clubs hold events as part of International Jawa Day, which is observed on the second Sunday of July. About 650 Jawa and Yezdi motorcycles took part in an event organised by the Bangalore club in 2016. More than 800 motorcycles were displayed at the 21st edition in Bengaluru in July 2023, with participants from Karnataka, Tamil Nadu and Kerala.

The history of Jawa and Yezdi was documented in Adil Jal Darukhanawala's 2018 book Jawa – The Forever Bike: The Definitive History of Ideal Jawa and Yezdi.

In 2023, Jawa Yezdi Motorcycles partnered with the Indian Armed Forces for a Kargil Vijay Diwas ride from Kohima to the Kargil War Memorial in Dras, covering 3,620 km with 24 serving personnel and veterans.

== Gallery ==
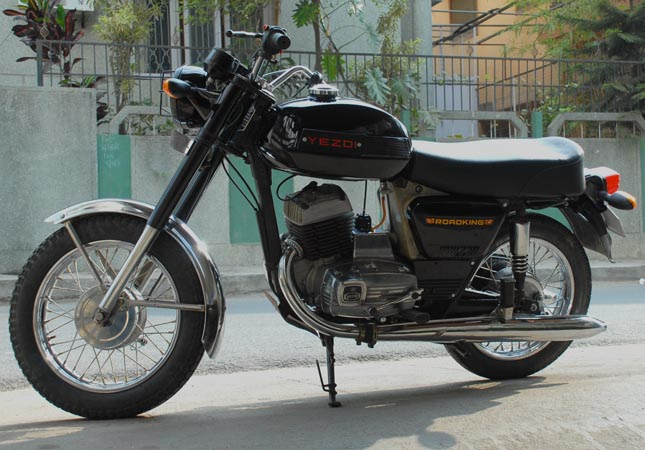
Yezdi Roadking

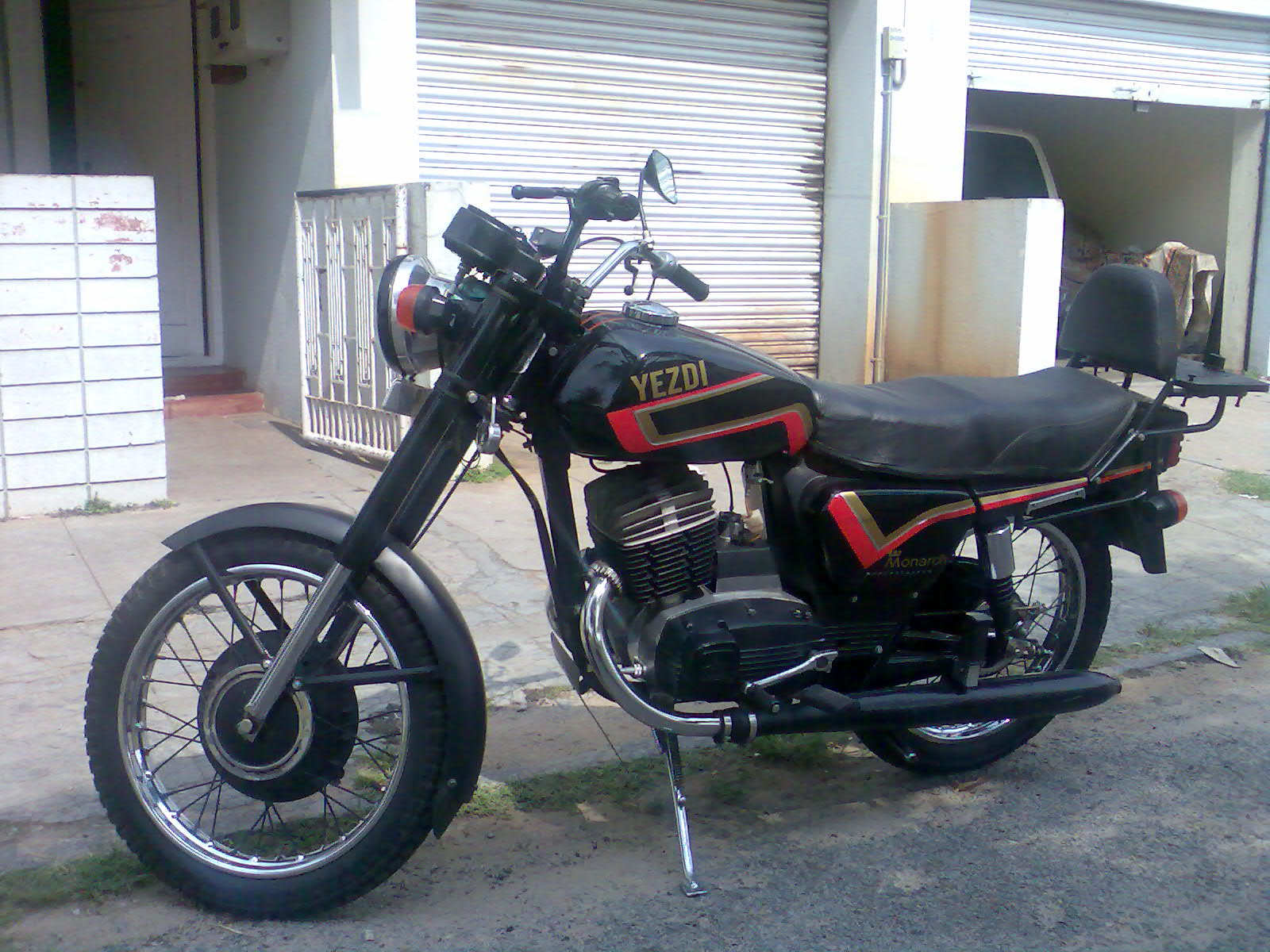
Yezdi Monarch

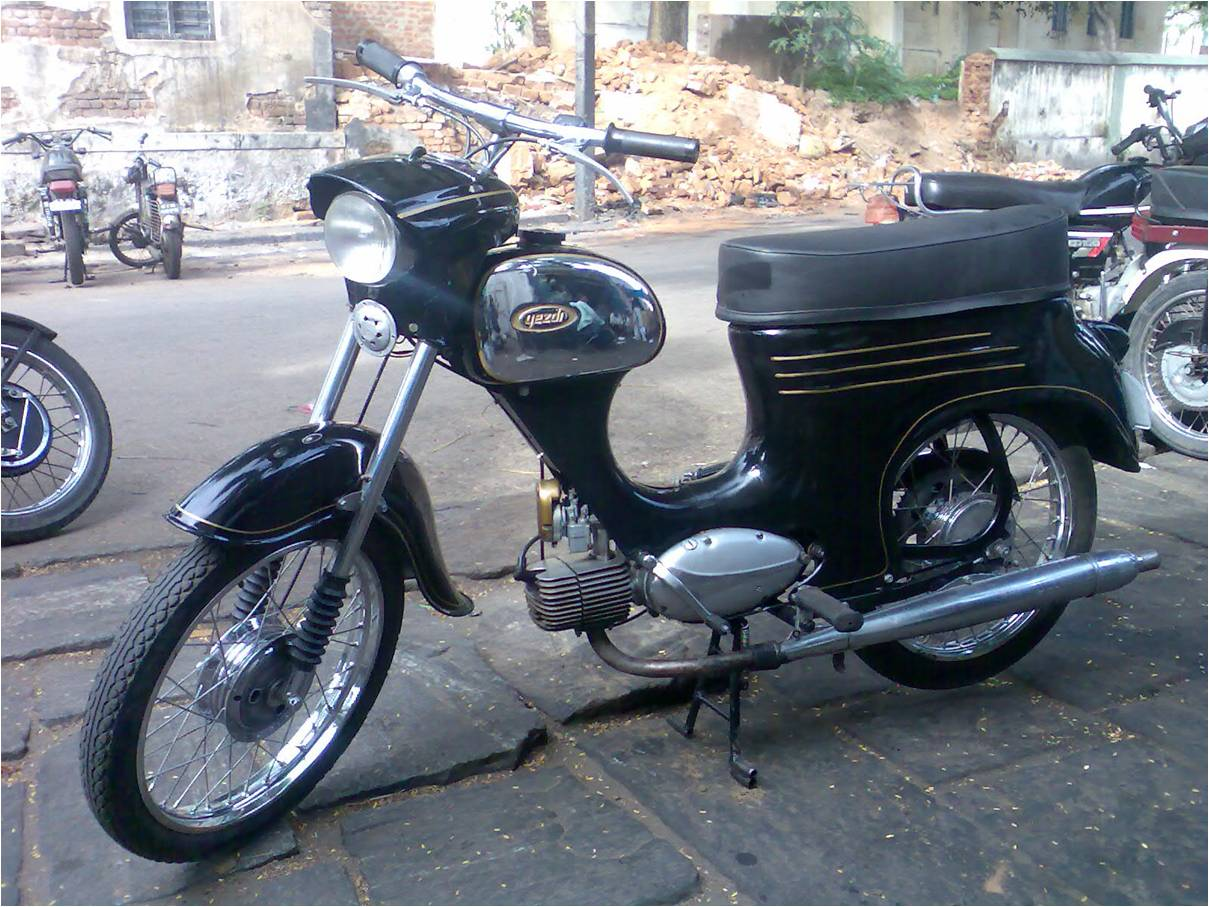
Yezdi 60 Jet

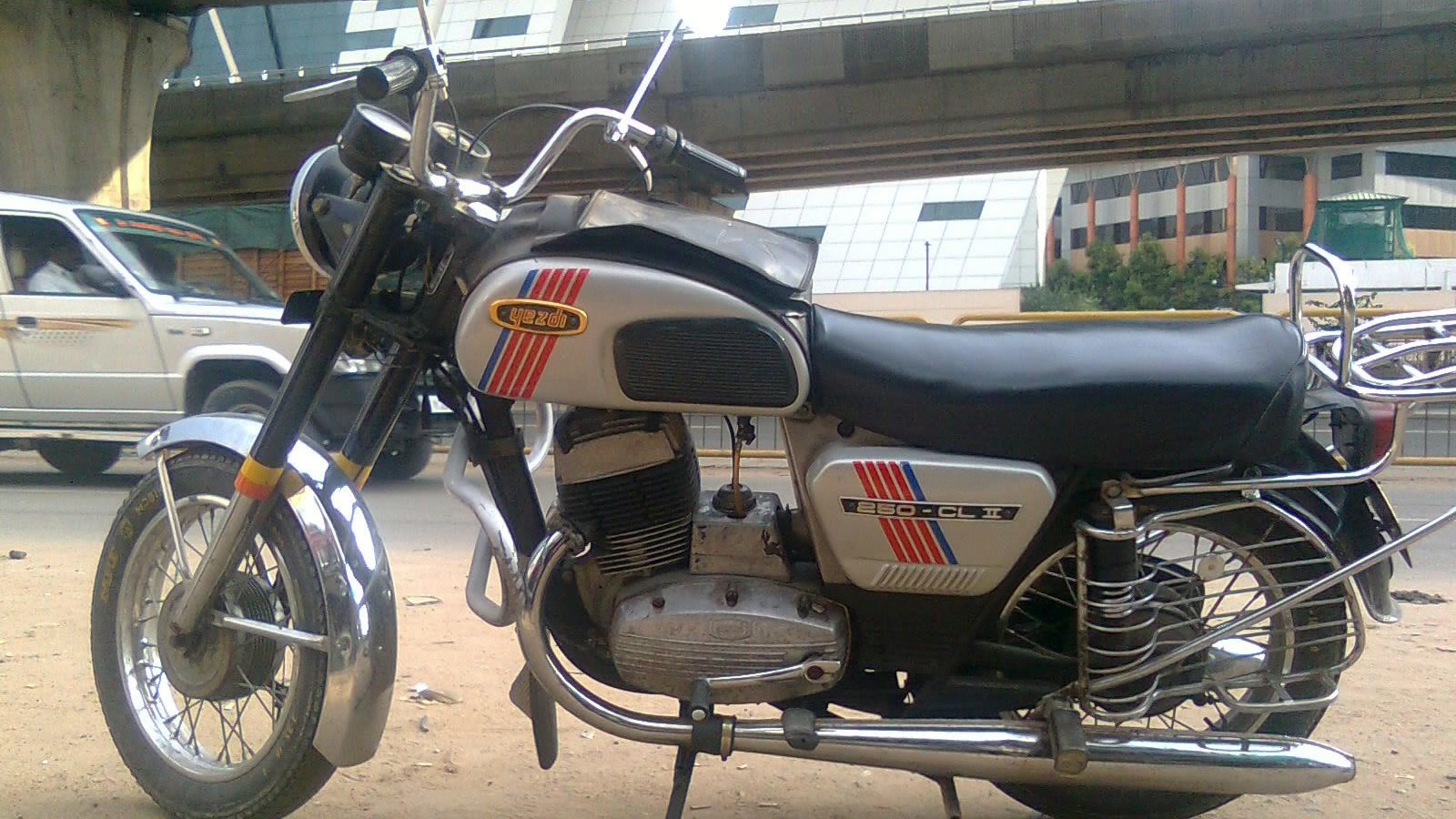
Yezdi Classic 250

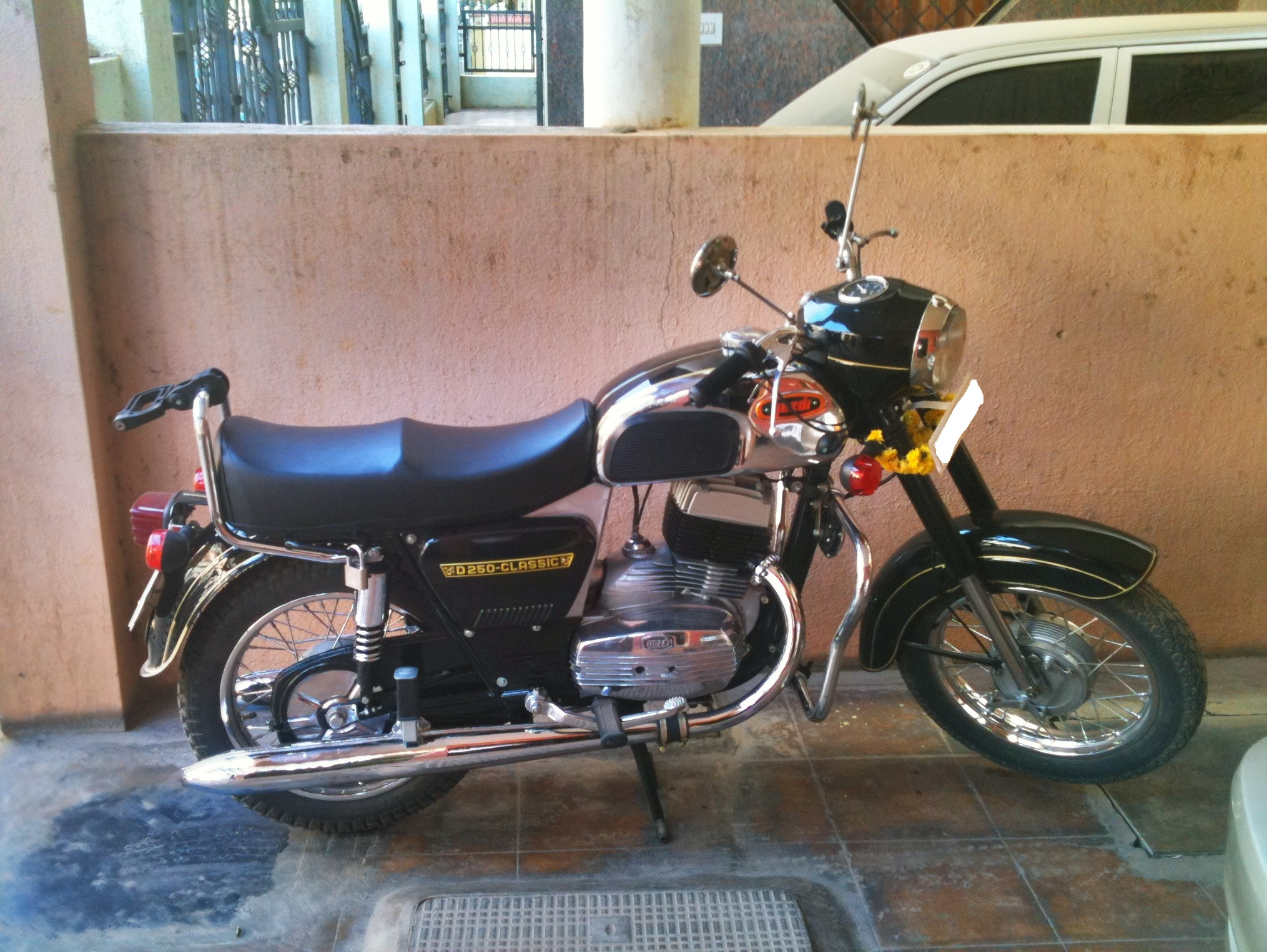
Yezdi 250 Classic D
