= Yezdi Roadking =

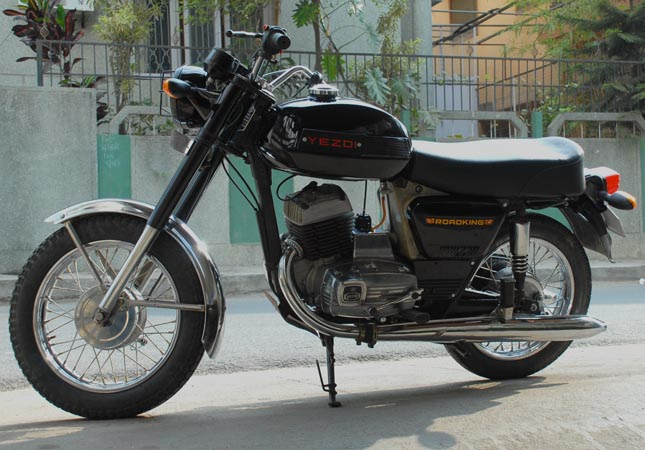
- Marketing Poster for Yezdi Roadking
- Manufacturer: Ideal Jawa
- Also called: Roadking
- Production: 1978-1996
- Predecessor: Yezdi Oilking
- Class: Standard
- Engine: 250 cc (15 cu in) Air-cooled, 2-stroke, single cylinder, dual exhaust
- Ignition type: Contact Breaker (until 1992), Electronic CDI (1993–1996)
- Transmission: 4-speed
- Suspension: Front: Telescopic - Hydraulic Travel - 130 mm, Rear: Hydraulic Shock Absorbers Travel - 100 mm
- Brakes: Front 160 mm Twin Cam double leading shoe Rear 160 mm Single Cam Single leading shoe
- Tyres: Tyres: 3.25 x 16 x 4 ply (front & rear), Rims: 1.86 x 16 (front & rear)
- Wheelbase: 1,350 mm (53.1 in)
- Dimensions: L: 2,000 mm (78.7 in); W: 750 mm (29.5 in); H: 1,100 mm (43.3 in)
- Weight: 134 kg (dry); 144 kg (wet)
- Fuel capacity: 16 L (3.5 imp gal; 4.2 US gal)
- Related: Yezdi Monarch

The Yezdi Roadking was a motorcycle produced in India by Ideal Jawa Ltd, Mysore from 1978 to 1996. It was based on the CZ 250 motocross (type 980.5) ridden by Jaroslav Falta to the runner-up spot in the 1974 motocross world championship. It was sold under the brand name Yezdi. The bike won several Indian rallies and road races. The bike had a 250 cc engine with dual exhausts and a semi-automatic clutch and Jawa/CZ's trademark integrated gear shifter/kick-starter.

== Origins ==
The Yezdi Roadking was the successor of the short-lived Yezdi Oilking. The Oilking was the first motorcycle in India to attempt to move away from pre-mixed fuel to a separate oil lube system via an oil pump. The box-like shape on the left hand cover housed the oil pump. Unfortunately this system had a very high failure rate resulting in piston seizures. This resulted in the discontinuation of the Oilking and the birth of the Roadking. The Roadking though, still retained the protuberance on the left engine cover that housed the oil pump in the Oilking. The Yezdi Roadking was based on the 1974 CZ 250 Falta, where the original bore and stroke of 70 mm × 64 mm (2.76 in × 2.52 in) was retained, but detuned for lower power than its Motocross original. The engine block is smaller than and different from the Yezdi Classic/Model B in appearance. Also the CZ original had a "Porcupine" cylinder head, which was used only in the initial models; the cylinder head later reverted to regular straight fin design. The cylinder block (Type 980.5) was from CZ. Just like in the older Jawa 353 Kývačka and the Yezdi Model B, the Roadking also came with an original Tesla (Czechoslovak) headlight bulb as standard.

== Frame ==
The frame is a single frame of motocross origin and was built out of square tube. The fork was more pronounced with a higher rake angle and came with adjustable shock absorbers. Rims were 16 inches. The motocross and ice racing origin frame and proper weight balance made handling very easy and agile compared to its rivals in India.

== Engine ==
The cylinder block was carried over from the CZ 250 motocross, which had an over-square stroke ratio. Carburetors were either Jikov (tickler choke) or Pacco, wherein the former was exclusively for the Roadking while the latter was used for the Classic D250 model. The spark plugs were cold and the bike also featured a semi-automatic clutch, where a mechanism by the name cam and roller connected to the clutch push rod to engage/disengage the clutch which is unique to this and other Yezdi/Jawa models. The cam and roller is mechanically coupled to the gear selector thereby eliminating the need for a hand-clutch while engaging the gears. The motorcycle featured dual exhaust ports with dual silencers akin to most Jawa motorcycles, but unlike the CZ 250 on which it was based, which featured a single exhaust port. Another unique feature of the bike was that the kick-starter and the gear shared the same shaft as with all Jawa/CZ/Yezdi motorcycles. Once the gear rod is reversed it doubles as a kicker and once started it automatically returns to the original position.

== Models ==
=== CB unit models ===
The bike was silently launched in India in the late 1970s by Ideal Jawa. It had a prominent fuel tank and was finished in signature Jawa maroon and sometimes in black and gold pinstripe, priced slightly higher than the Classic and CL II models. The troublesome contact breaker ignition was replaced in 1993 with an electronic CDI unit. Until 1989, Roadkings had a provision for adjusting the front fork dampers.

=== Oilking ===
During the late 1970s, another model known as Oil King was also launched which featured an oil pump for the 2T mix with petrol but later production ceased due to rampant issues with fuel pump failure. The prominent protrusion on the left hand side gearbox housing was the original location of the pump. Though the model was discontinued, the engine casing found its way into the Roadking and hence all Roadkings have this protrusion even though the oil pump is not included.

=== CDI unit models ===
In 1993, in an effort to increase fuel efficiency and to solve starting problems the CB or contact breaker ignition units were replaced with CDI electronic ignition units. The livery was also changed. Fuel efficiency was increased by 30%, however the motorcycle's competitors were getting better and with rising fuel prices the sales plummeted until finally it ceased operations in 1996.

=== Monarch ===
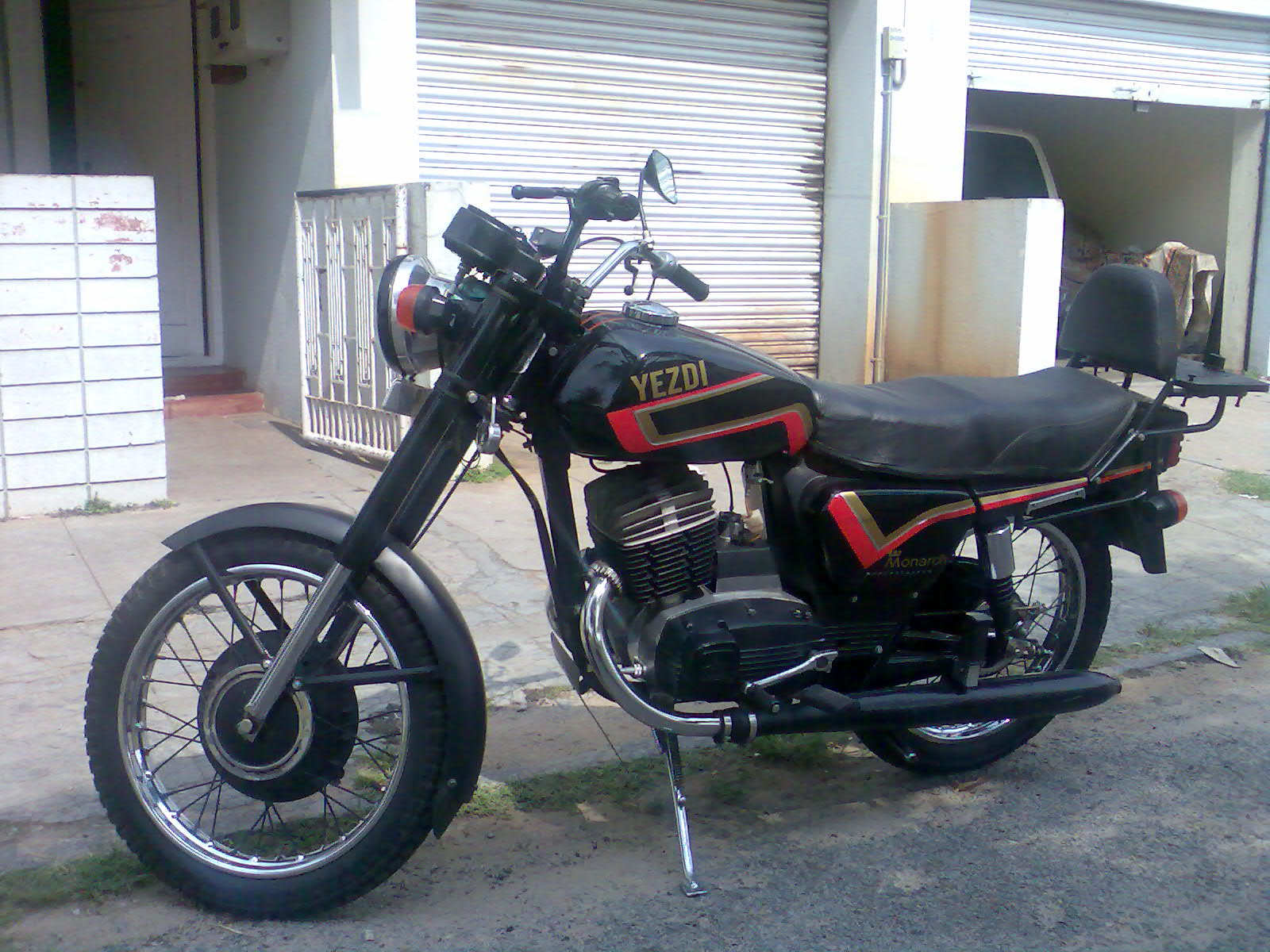
Yezdi Monarch

At the 1996 Auto Expo, Yezdi displayed a model which used the Yezdi 350 Twin frame & fuel tank, and the Roadking engine. The rims were 18 inch as opposed to the regular 16 inch. However, it sold only in few numbers. Although some attribute its low sales volume to the company's need to get rid of the surplus Yezdi 350 frames that remained in the factory after the Twin was discontinued.

== Indian Motorsports ==
In road races at Sholavaram, the Roadking ran in its own 250 cc class, while in the Indian open class category its main rival was Royal Enfield Bullet and later the much more powerful Rajdoot 350. Power was usually increased to 25+ bhp or beyond for Group E categories where the engine was bored up till 300 cc and over-engineered in stock trim. Among prominent racers were C.K. Chinnappa and Somender Singh. In rallies, N. Jagadeeswara Reddy won many rallies until 1980. Then racing couple Jagat and Anita Nanjappa and Thirumal Roy won several victories before switching to the Rajdoot Yamaha RD350. During the early 1990s FMSCI, the sporting federation of India banned two-wheelers above 120 cc from rallies thus ending the Roadking's run in motor sports.

== Powergliders ==
The Roadking engines were a favorite among the hang-glider manufacturers in India. A Coimbatore based manufacturer headed by late motor racing driver and constructor, S. Karivardhan manufactured and exported several Power gliders using Roadking engines with modified aluminum heads, K & N filters and sleeved bore.

=== Further developments ===
As a result of power glider efforts, during 1996 Somender Singh, a former Ideal Jawa road and rally racer developed a more refined engine, made from aluminium as opposed to the usual cast-iron, with increased power and fuel efficiency which was featured in Car & Bike magazine. The design was never put into production even though it ended up with Ideal Jawa.

These motorcycles were also used by various police forces around the world, examples being Guatemala, Sri Lanka, Egypt, Turkey etc.
