= Rajdoot 350 =

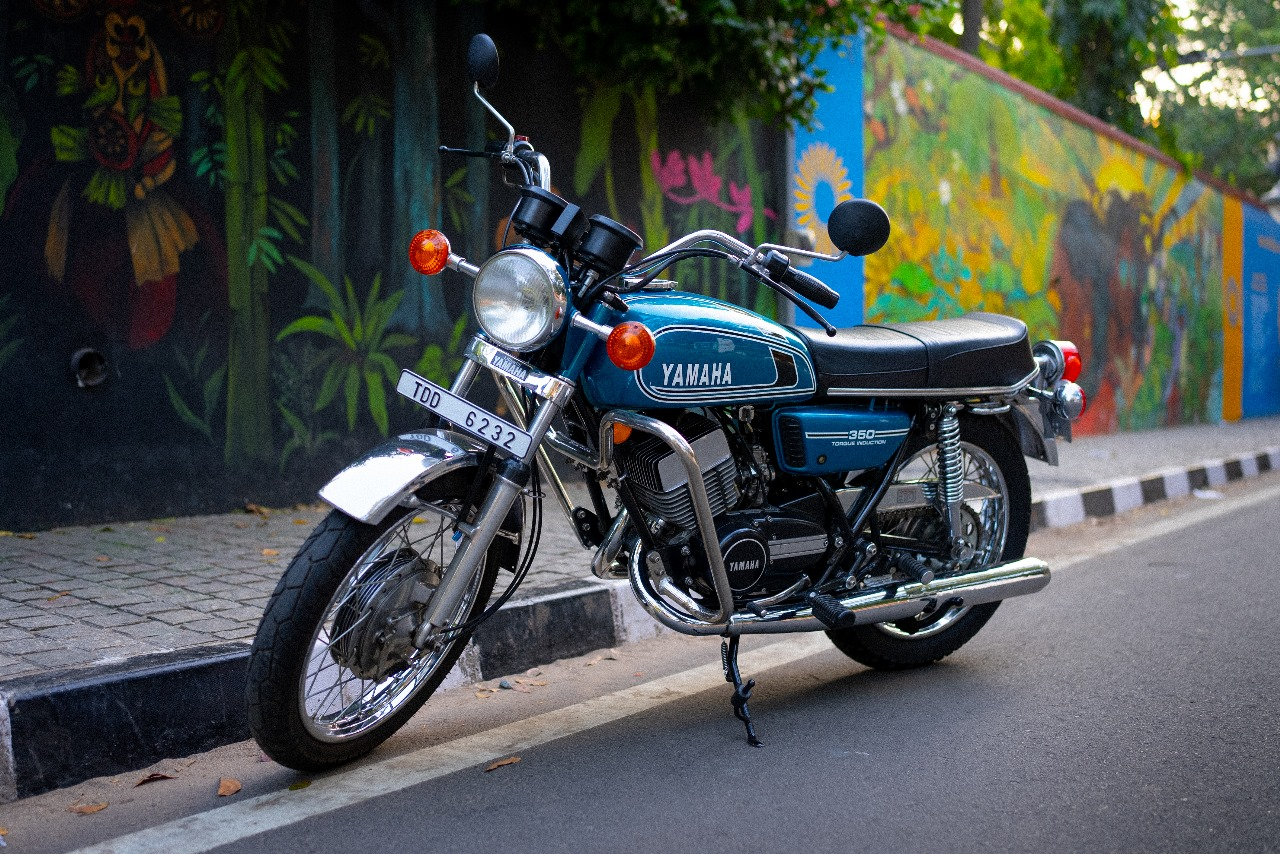
- Manufacturer: Escorts Group
- Production: 1983–1989
- Predecessor: Yamaha RD350
- Class: Standard
- Engine: 347 cc (21.2 cu in) two stroke, air-cooled, parallel twin, twin carburetor, 7 port torque induction with reed valve
- Ignition type: CB points (Core: Kokusan Denki AR 3345 Points: Daiichi)
- Transmission: 6-speed manual
- Suspension: Front: telescopic fork, Rear: swingarm
- Brakes: 180mm drum brakes (TLS front)
- Tires: Front: 3.00-18"(4 ply rating), Rear: 3.50-18"(4 ply rating)
- Wheelbase: 1,320 mm (52 in)
- Dimensions: L: 2,040 mm (80 in); W: 835 mm (32.9 in); H: 1,110 mm (44 in)
- Weight: 143 kg (315 lb) (dry); 155 kg (342 lb) (wet)
- Fuel capacity: 16 L (3.5 imp gal; 4.2 US gal)
- Turning radius: 2,300 mm (91 in)
- Related: Yamaha RD350LC

The Rajdoot 350 , also known as the RD, was a two-stroke Yamaha inspired motorcycle made in India by Escorts group from 1983 to 1989. RD stands for 'Race derived', in India promoted by Rajdoot in collaboration with Yamaha Japan.

It is a licensed copy of the Yamaha RD350B, modified to suit Indian conditions. Even though the production of the air-cooled Yamaha RD350 had ended in Japan in the mid-1970s due to stringent emissions norms, it was a technically advanced motorcycle in the Indian market in 1983. It has a 7-port two stroke parallel twin engine, Yamaha's patented Torque Induction System using reed valves, 6-speed manual transmission, autolube system, mechanical tachometer, 12 volt electrics and 0–60 km/h in less than four seconds. In the interest of cost, the front disc brake of the RD350B was substituted with a 7" twin leading shoe drum brake from the Yamaha

It was primarily targeted at the Royal Enfield Bullet 350, which was the biggest-capacity motorbike in India at the time. The Yezdi Roadking 250 was another competitor. However, the Rajdoot 350 was not a commercial success due to its relatively high fuel consumption in a cost-conscious Indian market. High purchase price, poor availability of expensive spare parts and lack of trained service personnel did not help either. After the runaway success of its smaller stablemate Yamaha RX 100 introduced in 1985, the Rajdoot 350 stayed in production as a flagship model, and production ended in 1990. The last bikes were reported to be sold in 1991.

== HT(Stock)/LT(LETI) and CUSP Model ==
- 'High Torque (HT- Stock Engine)'

The HT was made from 1983 to 1985 (until 1989 for the Government). It develops a respectable 30.5bhp @6750 rpm, detuned from 39 bhp (29 kW) by restricting the exhaust ports of the Yamaha RD350B. Some HTs have mufflers with flatter ends. HT exhausts make the raucous "RD growl" compared to the more toned-down LT beat. Initial bikes had KOITO Headlights. Engine number of HT Starts with 1A1.51.******

- '(HT/LT Switchable) : First Batch of LETI'

This was not a variant that could be chosen; this was basically the first version of LETI, which had parts from the stock bike and a change in port with a changeable option to Stock Spec Exhaust Port. This model cosmetically resembled HT, with the left side engine cover marked "Made in Japan".Exhaust with flatter ends. The barrels of this early model had a removable plate(RESTRICTOR PLATES) for the exhaust port. With the plate installed, the exhaust port will be on the Leti specification and once removed, it will be HT spec. The Head was the LETI Specification. Headlights were changed to Stanley Japan. The engine number of this early Model starts with 00****

- 'Low Torque (LETI - Low End Torque Induction)'

LT was made from 1985 to 1989. It develops 26.5 bhp (19.8 kW) (+/- 10%) because the exhaust ports are restricted even further. LETI bike was the fastest accelerating RD up to 100 km/h due to its low-end power delivery compared to HT. All LTs have the left engine cover marked "Made in India". The mufflers have slightly tapered or conical ends. The only notable upgrades to the LT in 1988 were slightly stiffer front forks in 1989. We can identify whether it is HT or LT by looking at the engine number at the start.Towards the end of production, most of the parts were localised. Headlights changed to Lumax. Engine number of LT Starts with 00****

== The other side ==
A variety of issues hindered the sales of RD350 in India. Maintenance of an RD350 was not an easy task as there were not enough trained mechanics who could handle its twin-cylinder engine. Spare parts were neither readily available nor very affordable. The HT's fuel consumption is 20 km/L (urban) 25 (mixed), that of the LT is 35 km/L - figures considered quite steep by most of the population at the time. According to reports, Yamaha is planning to reintroduce their iconic RD350 motorcycle in the coming months, unveiling a fresh variant called the XSR300.

== See also ==
- Yamaha RD350
- List of Yamaha motorcycles
