= Ideal Jawa =

Indian motorcycle company (1960–1996)

- Forever Bike, Forever Value
- Type: Motorcycle manufacturer
- Industry: Automotive
- Founded: 1960
- Defunct: 1996
- Fate: defunct
- Headquarters: Mysore, Karnataka, India
- Key people: Farrokh Irani, Founder
- Products: Jawa, Yezdi
- Number of employees: 3500
- Website: yezdi.com

Ideal Jawa (India) Ltd was an Indian motorcycle company based in Mysore, which sold licensed Jawa motorcycles beginning in 1960 under the brand name Jawa and from 1973 as Yezdi. Jawa motorcycles were introduced in India in 1960 and they have a cult following to this present day. Production was carried out directly in India by Ideal Jawa India Ltd. The Yezdi factory was located at Yadavagiri along the railway line which heads to Mysore Junction. The factory was inaugurated by the then Governor of Mysore State, Sri Jayachamaraja Wadiyar, Maharaja of Mysore in 1961.

The company stopped production in 1996.

On 13 January 2022, Classic Legends, a subsidiary of Mahindra & Mahindra, revived the Yezdi brand in India with three models: the Roadster, Scrambler and Adventure. The motorcycles were sold through the company's existing Jawa dealer network.

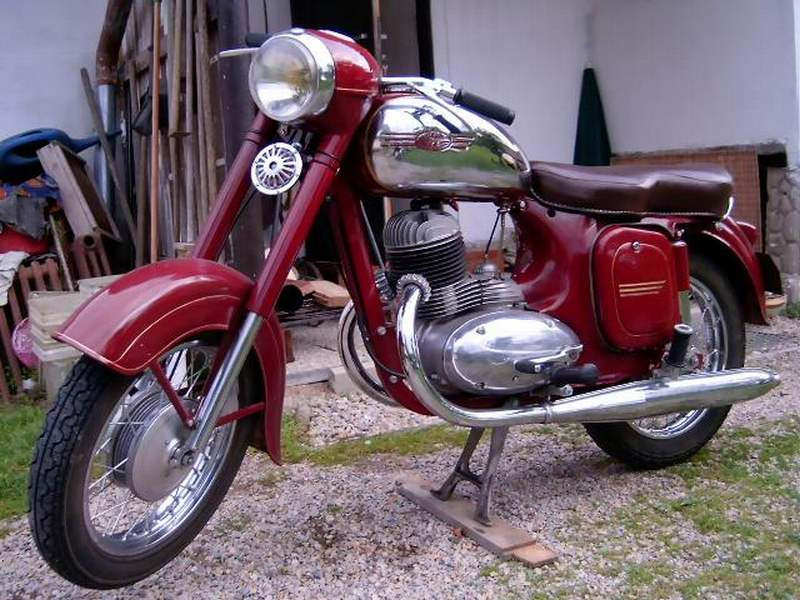
Jawa 250 cc 'A' (Type 353 Kyvacka)

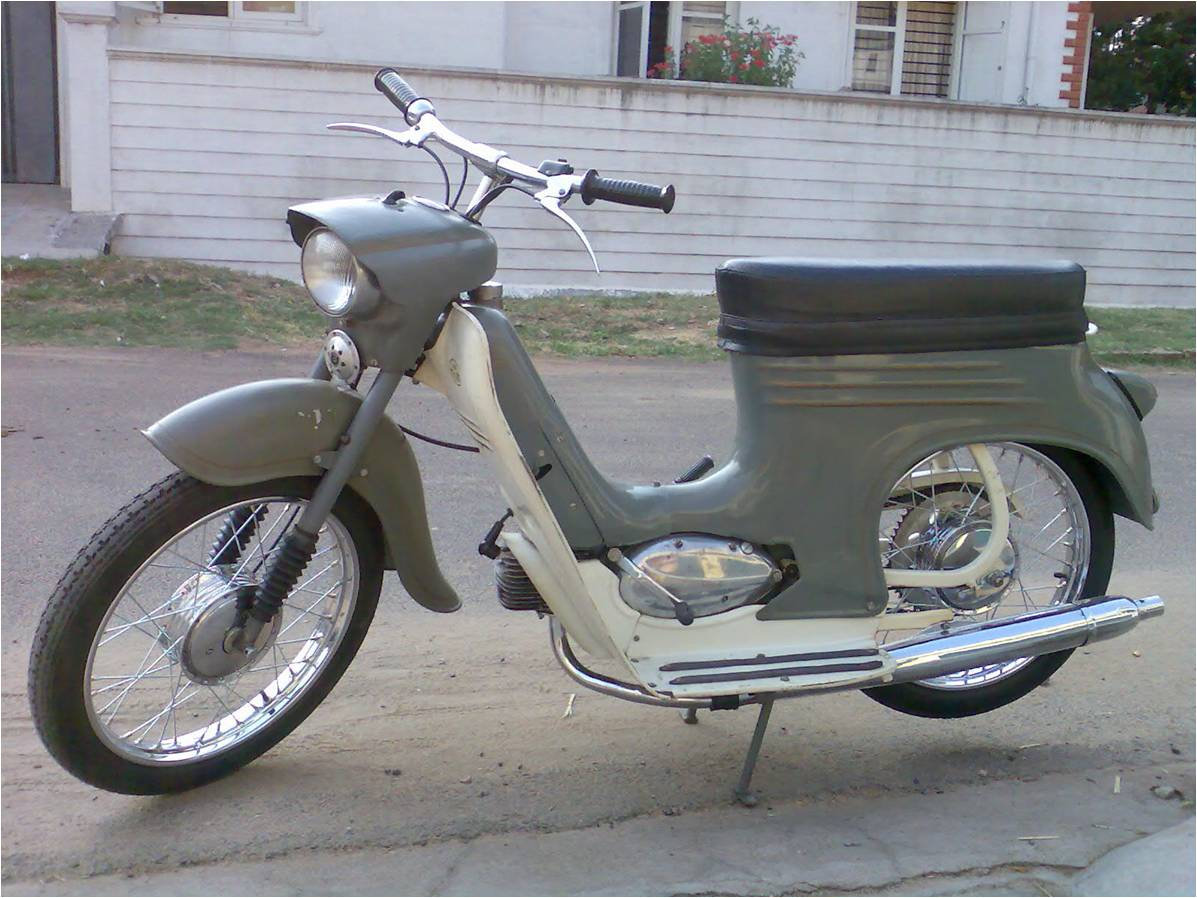
Jawa Jet 50 cc 'A' (Type 555 Pionyr)

== Models ==
There have been many models of this brand before the company shut its doors in 1996. Their various models are included below:

- Jawa 250 typ 353/04 Kyvacka called 'A' Type (under license)
- Jawa 50 Pionyr typ 555 (under license)
- Jawa 50 Jet 'A' Series
- Jawa / Yezdi 250 'B' Type (Radial Head & Dimple Tank Transition Model)
- Yezdi 60 Jet 'B' Series
- Yezdi 250 'B' Type (Model B)
- Yezdi 250 Oilking (CB Points and Oil Pump) 'C' Type
- Yezdi 250 Roadking (CB Points) 'C' Type
- Yezdi B250 Deluxe 'B' Type or "B1"
- Yezdi D250 Classic 'D' Type
- Yezdi 250 CL II 'D' Type
- Yezdi 250 Deluxe 'D' Type (1985-87)
- Yezdi 250 Deluxe 'D' Type (Big Tank & Megaphone Silencers) (1988-95)
- Yezdi 60 Jet 'C' Series
- Yezdi 60 Colt
- Yezdi 175 (CB Points)
- Yezdi 60 Colt Deluxe
- Jawa / Yezdi 350 Twin (Jawa 350 typ 634 Powered)
- Yezdi 175 Deluxe (CDI)
- Yezdi 250 Roadking (CDI) 'C' Type
- Yezdi 250 Monarch (CDI) 'C' Type
- I.Jawa 250 Roadking (CDI) 'C' Type (Export Model)
- Yezdi 250 MT (CDI) 'C' Type (Export Model)
- Yezdi 125 Deluxe (Never released)
- Yezdi 250 Supersprint 'C' Type (Never released)

The 'A', 'B', 'C', 'D' Types are the model of Engine that particular bike has.

Ideal Jawa also exported many of the above models to over 61 countries around the world including Turkey, Nigeria, Sri Lanka, Egypt and others. Guatemala was supplied with custom White Yezdi Roadkings for their Police forces. Some Yezdi 175s were supplied to an oil company in Ghana. A model exported to Venezuela was called the Yezdi 250 MT. A few Yezdi Monarchs were used for Pizza delivery in Abu Dhabi, UAE.

== End of production ==
When the company was forced to shut down, it was producing the 175, Monarch, Deluxe, Road Kings and CL II. The main reason for the company's collapse was labor trouble and increasing levels of pollution control norms which were making the two stroke bikes that the company produced obsolete. With the advent of Yamaha and Honda in India, these bikes lost their status as Yezdis were heavier and in some cases slower with lower fuel efficiency.

== In motorsports ==
Ideal Jawa had factory teams for both road races at Sholavaram and the National Motorcycle Rally Championships. Yezdis were preferred rally bikes in the 80s and 90s.

== Yezdi brand relaunch ==
In January 2022, the Yezdi brand was reintroduced in the Indian market by Classic Legends, after a gap of 25 years.

At the launch date, available models included a scrambler, a roadster, and an adventure motorcycle. The models relaunched in 2022 are not from Ideal Jawa but from Classic Legends Private Limited.

== Photo gallery ==
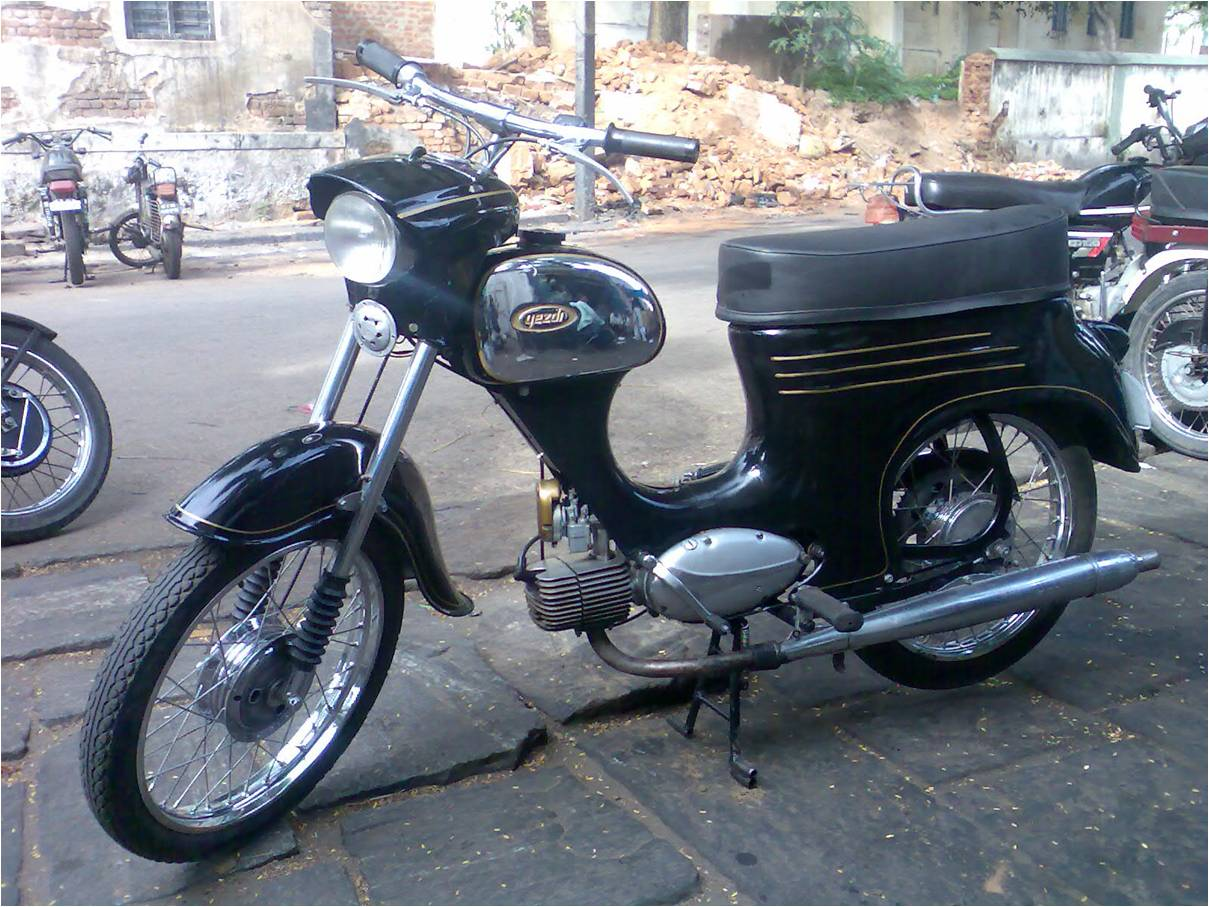
Yezdi Jet 60 'B' Series

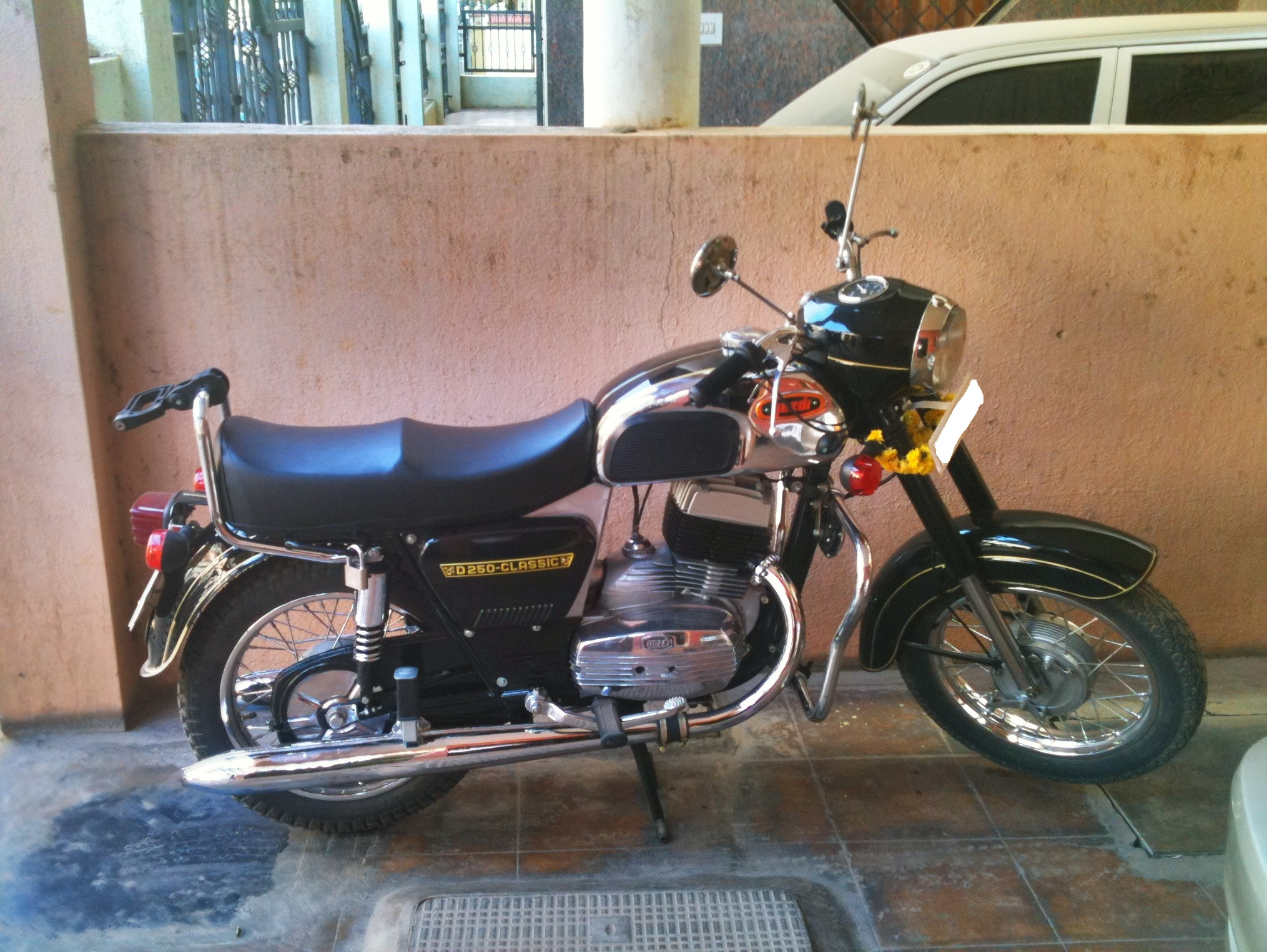
Yezdi 250 Classic 'D' Type

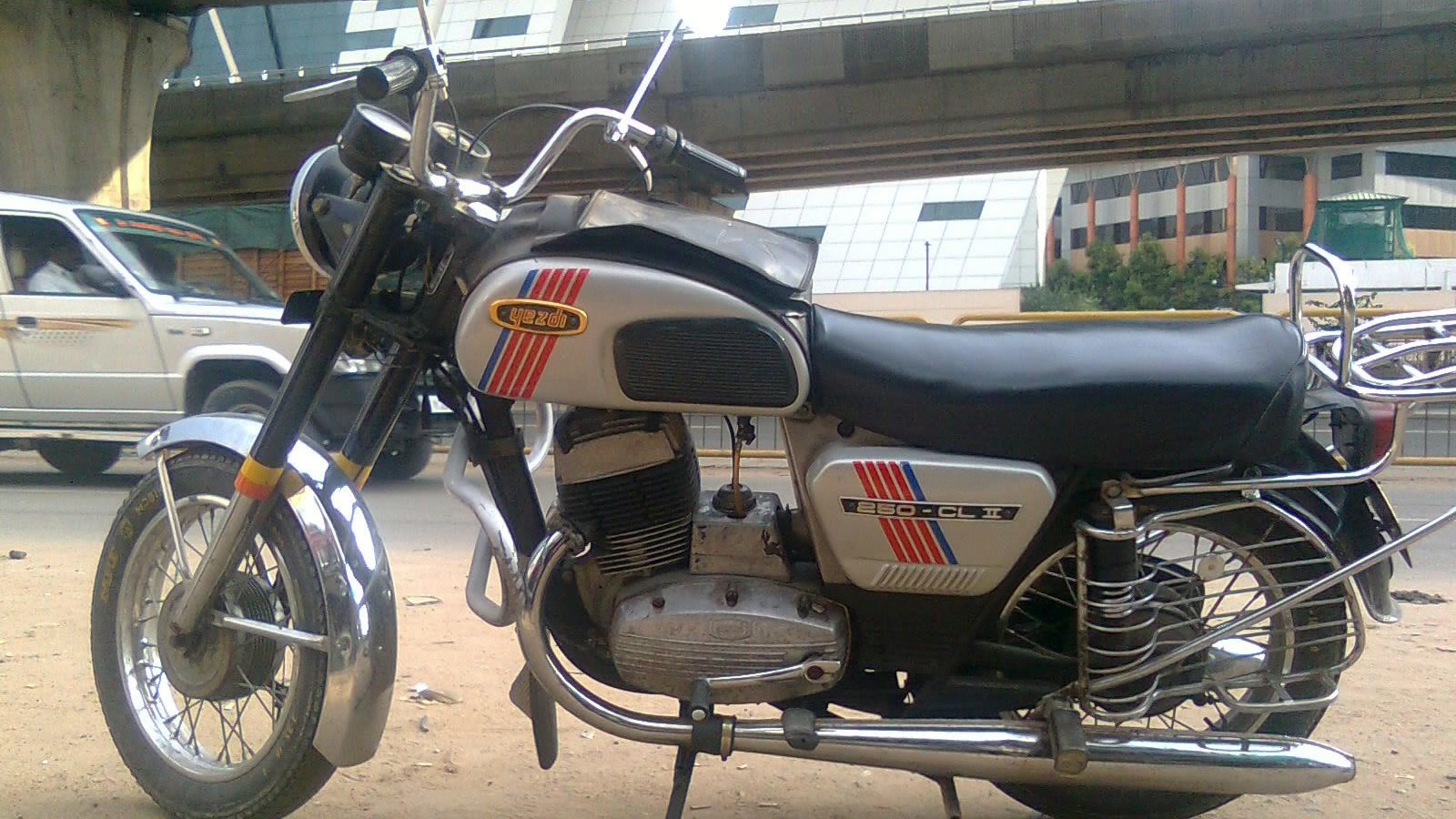
Yezdi 250 CL-II 'D' Type

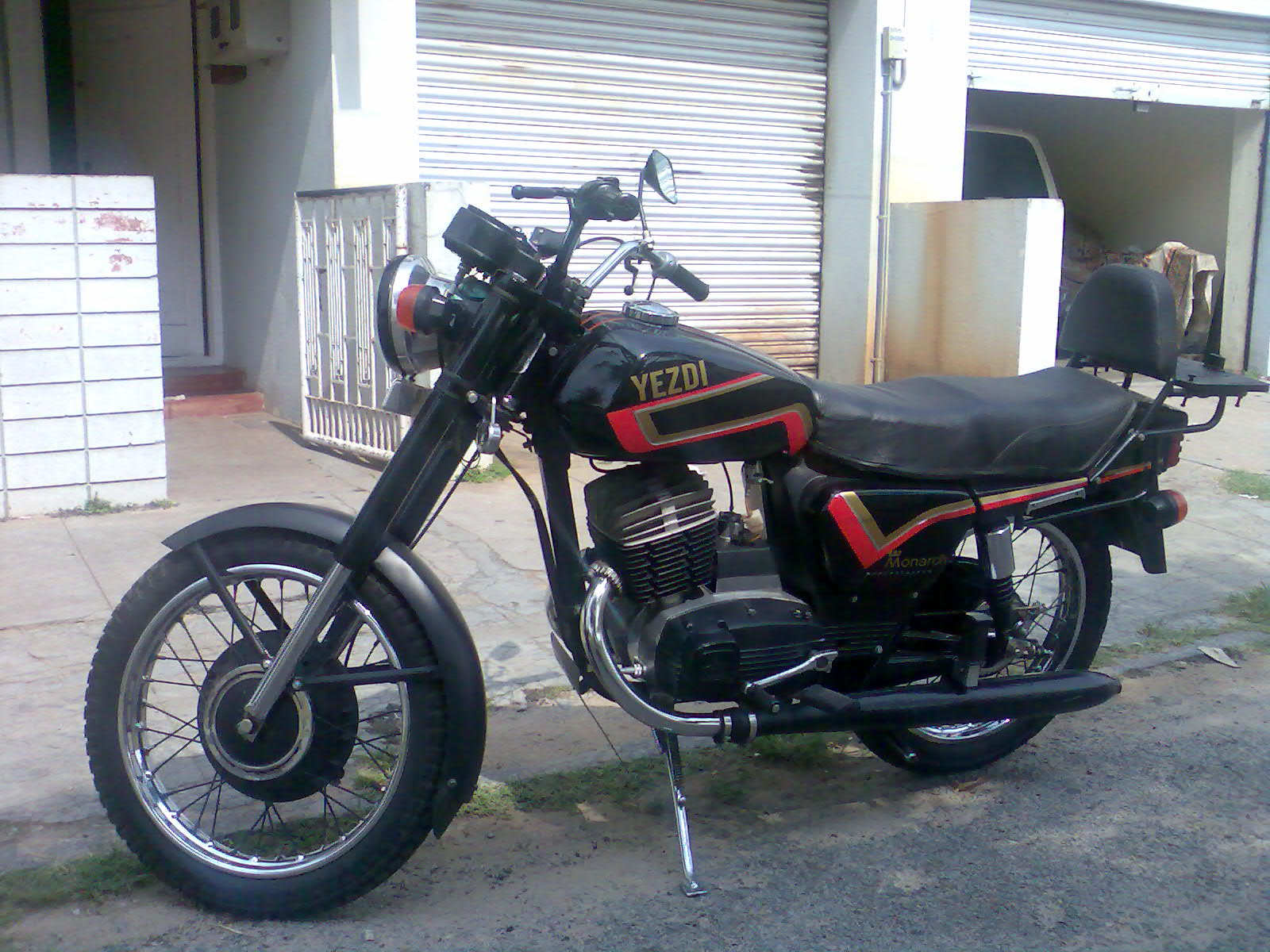
Yezdi 250 Monarch 'C' Type

Jawa 42

== See also ==
- Jawa Motors
