= Classic Legends (company) =

Indian motorbike manufacturer

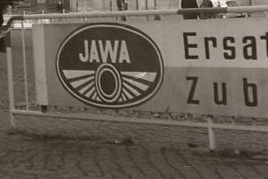
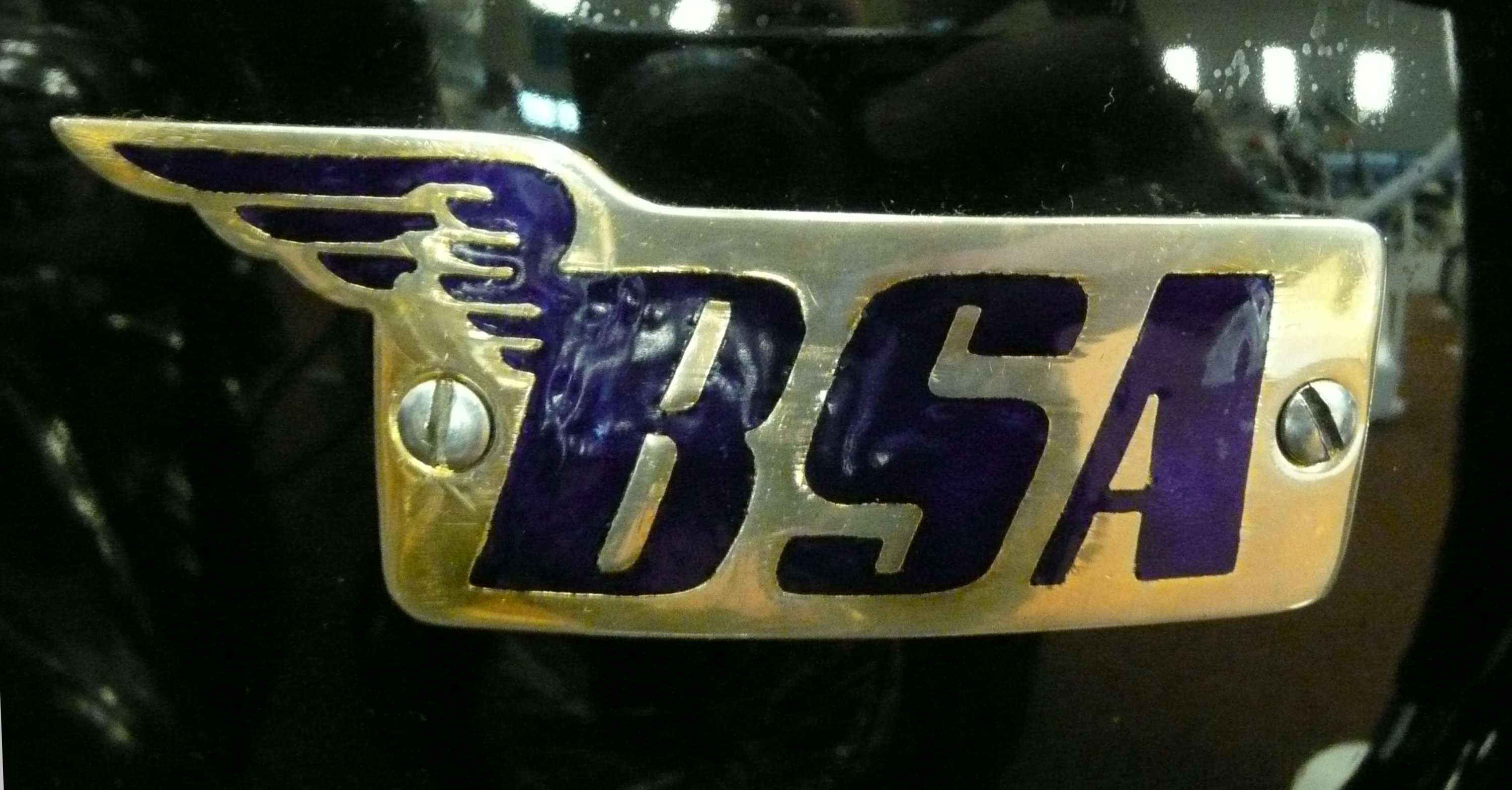
Classic Legends sells bikes of 3 brands in India.

Classic Legends is an Indian motorcycle manufacturer. It was set up in 2015 by the Mahindra and Mahindra group to manufacture and promote two-wheelers under its vintage brands Jawa, Yezdi, and BSA. According to Autocar India, in 2024, it had less than 1% market share in India's two-wheeler market. In 2026, it was among the top 10 two-wheeler brands in the country, with a market share of 5%.

Photo of Jawa 42 by Classic Legends

The company has patented its adjustable visor and speedometer system and airfilter multifrequency resonator. The latter is available in its BSA bikes launched in the United Kingdom.

In 2025, it re-launched the 1942 model BSA WM20 motorcycle best known for its use in a song in the Hindi film Sholay (1975).

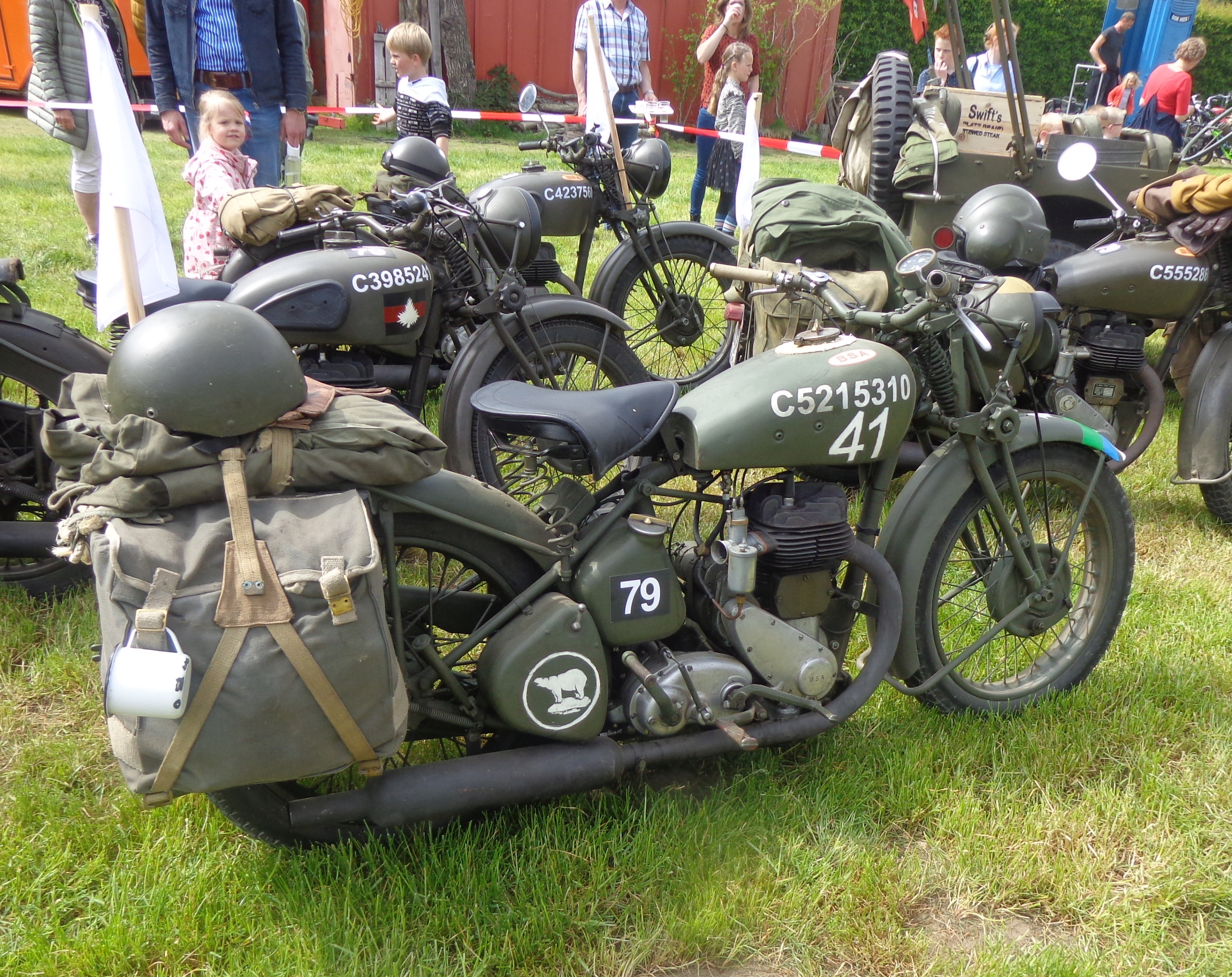
A 1944 model of BSA WM20

== Controversies ==
In December 2022, a bench of the Karnataka High Court had restrained Classic Legends and its promotors from using the trademark "Yezdi". However, another bench of the same court struck down the verdict in December 2024 and restored the trademark back to the company, claiming that the mark's registration had been lapsed for more than 15 years after the Yezdi brand was wound up in India in 1996.

In 2025, the company filed a defamation suit against a customer after he posted critical reviews about his Yezdi/Jawa bike experience online.

== See also ==
- Royal Enfield
- Ideal Jawa
