= CK Chinnappa =

Indian motorsports driver

Chandra Kumar Chinnappa (born 16 May 1953) born in Bangalore (now Bengaluru) is an Indian motorsports athlete and administrator. He is a racing driver and a rally co-driver. Chinnappa took part in Indian National bike races in various disciplines like rallies, autocross, motocross, hill climb and drag meets, and in later years he became a regular four-wheeler rally co-driver in the Indian National Rally Championship (INRC) for an overall career spanning 34 active years as a competitor.He is currently a senior steward of the Federation of Motor Sports Clubs of India (FMSCI).

== Motorsports career ==
Popularly known as Chinni, Chinnappa started his career in a club rally in 1973 and made his debut in the maiden Karnataka 1000 rally (K1000) for bikes organised by Bangalore Motorsports Club, which later became Karnataka Motor Sports Club (KMSC). He started on an Yezdi. Initially, the K1000 Rally, used to be run over a distance of about 1000 miles across more than two states in the TSD format for both the bikes and four-wheelers. In late eighties, Chinnappa shifted to four-wheelers and took part in the National four-wheeler rallies regularly from early nineties until he retired in 2007. He also won many other cross-country National events like Himalayan Rally and Desert Storm. He retired after winning the Desert Storm with Anil Wadia in 2007 to take care of his son Deepak Chinnappa's motorsports career. He won the Rally Star Cup at Nashik in 2003. He won the Himalayan Rally in 2000.

Representing JK Tyre rallying team, Chinnappa navigated for Manik Raikhy in 1997 and went on to call the pace notes, for many more drivers, in a four-wheeler career spanning over a decade.

Chinnappa now attends major motorsports events in the country as a steward of the Federation of Motor Sports Clubs of India (fmsci).
